= Administrative divisions of Volyn Oblast =

The administrative division of Volyn Oblast consists of two levels of territorial subdivision. It is subdivided into districts (raions), which are subdivided into municipalities (hromadas).

== Current ==
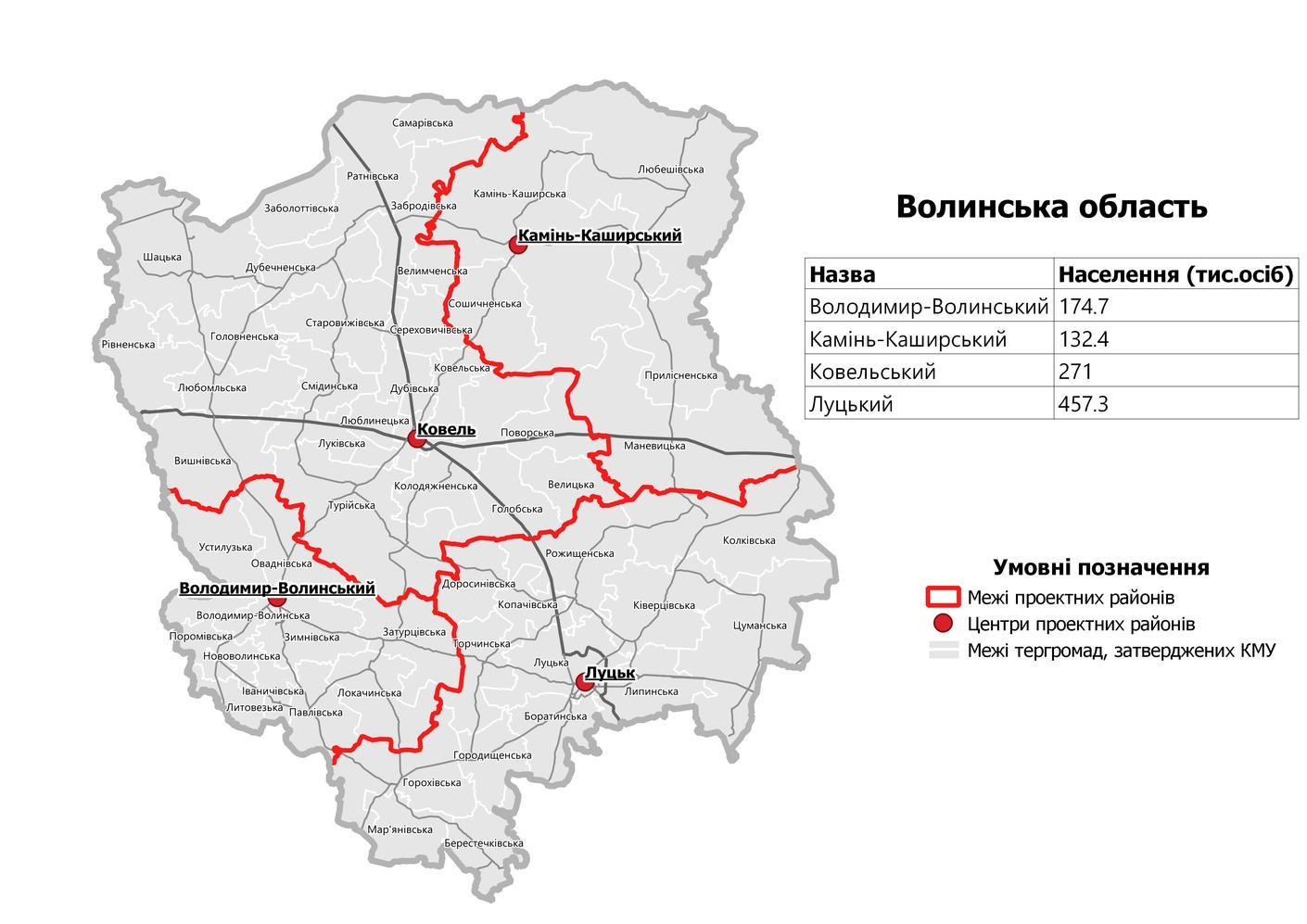
Raions of Volyn Oblast as of August 2020.

On 18 July 2020, the number of districts was reduced to four. These are:

1. Kamin-Kashyrskyi (Камінь-Каширський район), the center is in the city of Kamin-Kashyrskyi;
2. Kovel (Ковельський район), the center is in the city of Kovel;
3. Lutsk (Луцький район), the center is in the city of Lutsk;
4. Volodymyr (Володимирський район), the center is in the city of Volodymyr.

**Volyn Oblast**
As of January 1, 2022
Number of districts (raions)	4
Number of municipalities (hromadas)	54

=== Communities (hromadas) per District (raion) ===
In bold are communities (hromadas) with cities

Kamin-Kashyrskyi Raion

- **Kamin-Kashyrskyi**
- Liubeshiv
- Manevychi
- Prylisne
- Soshychne

Kovel Raion

- Holoby
- Holovne
- Dubechne
- Dubove
- Kolodyazhne
- **Kovel**
- Liublynets
- **Liuboml**
- Lukiv
- Povorsk
- Ratne
- Rivne
- Samary
- Serekhovychi
- Shatsk
- Smidyn
- Stara Vyzhivka
- Turiysk
- Velymche
- Velytsk
- Vyshniv
- Zabolottia
- Zabrody

Lutsk Raion

- **Berestechko**
- Boratyn
- Dorosyni
- Horodyshche
- **Horokhiv**
- **Kivertsi**
- Kolky
- Kopachivka
- **Lutsk**
- Maryanivka
- **Olyka**
- Pidhaitsi
- **Rozhyshche**
- Torchyn
- Tsuman

Volodymyr Raion

- Ivanychi
- Lokachi
- Lytovezh
- **Novovolynsk**
- Ovadne
- Pavlivka
- Poromiv
- **Ustyluh**
- **Volodymyr**
- Zaturtsi
- Zymne

== Administrative divisions until 2020 ==
Raions of Volyn Oblast as of June 2020. The city of Lutsk is shown in dark blue.

In 2020, Volyn Oblast was subdivided into 20 regions: 16 districts (raions) and 4 city municipalities (mis'krada or misto), officially known as territories governed by city councils.

- City municipalities:
  - Lutsk (Луцьк), the administrative center of the oblast
  - Kovel (Ковель)
  - Novovolynsk Municipality
    - Cities under the city's jurisdiction:
      - Novovolynsk (Нововолинськ)
    - Urban-type settlements under the city's jurisdiction:
      - Blahodatne (Благодатне), formerly Zhovtneve
  - Volodymyr-Volynskyi (Володимир-Волинський)
- Districts (raions):
  - Horokhiv (Горохівський район)
    - Cities under the district's jurisdiction:
      - Berestechko (Берестечко)
      - Horokhiv (Горохів)
    - Urban-type settlements under the district's jurisdiction:
      - Marianivka (Мар'янівка)
      - Senkevychivka (Сенкевичівка)
  - Ivanychi (Іваничівський район)
    - Urban-type settlements under the district's jurisdiction:
      - Ivanychi (Іваничі)
  - Kamin-Kashyrskyi (Камінь-Каширський район)
    - Cities under the district's jurisdiction:
      - Kamin-Kashyrskyi (Камінь-Каширський)
  - Kivertsi (Ківерцівський район)
    - Cities under the district's jurisdiction:
      - Kivertsi (Ківерці)
    - Urban-type settlements under the district's jurisdiction:
      - Olyka (Олика)
      - Tsuman (Цумань)
  - Kovel (Ковельський район)
    - Urban-type settlements under the district's jurisdiction:
      - Holoby (Голоби)
      - Liublynets (Люблинець)
  - Liubeshiv (Любешівський район)
    - Urban-type settlements under the district's jurisdiction:
      - Liubeshiv (Любешів)
  - Liuboml (Любомльський район)
    - Cities under the district's jurisdiction:
      - Liuboml (Любомль)
    - Urban-type settlements under the district's jurisdiction:
      - Holovne (Головне)
  - Lokachi (Локачинський район)
    - Urban-type settlements under the district's jurisdiction:
      - Lokachi (Локачі)
  - Lutsk (Луцький район)
    - Urban-type settlements under the district's jurisdiction:
      - Rokyni (Рокині)
      - Torchyn (Торчин)
  - Manevychi (Маневицький район)
    - Urban-type settlements under the district's jurisdiction:
      - Kolky (Колки)
      - Manevychi (Маневичі)
  - Ratne (Ратнівський район)
    - Urban-type settlements under the district's jurisdiction:
      - Ratne (Ратне)
      - Zabolottia (Заболоття)
  - Rozhyshche (Рожищенський район)
    - Cities under the district's jurisdiction:
      - Rozhyshche (Рожище)
    - Urban-type settlements under the district's jurisdiction:
      - Dubyshche (Дубище)
  - Shatsk (Шацький район)
    - Urban-type settlements under the district's jurisdiction:
      - Shatsk (Шацьк)
  - Stara Vyzhivka (Старовижівський район)
    - Urban-type settlements under the district's jurisdiction:
      - Stara Vyzhivka (Стара Вижівка)
  - Turiisk (Турійський район)
    - Urban-type settlements under the district's jurisdiction:
      - Lukiv (Луків)
      - Turiisk (Турійськ)
  - Volodymyr-Volynskyi (Володимир-Волинський район)
    - Cities under the district's jurisdiction:
      - Ustyluh (Устилуг)
