= Stokhid =

River in Ukraine

Stokhid River
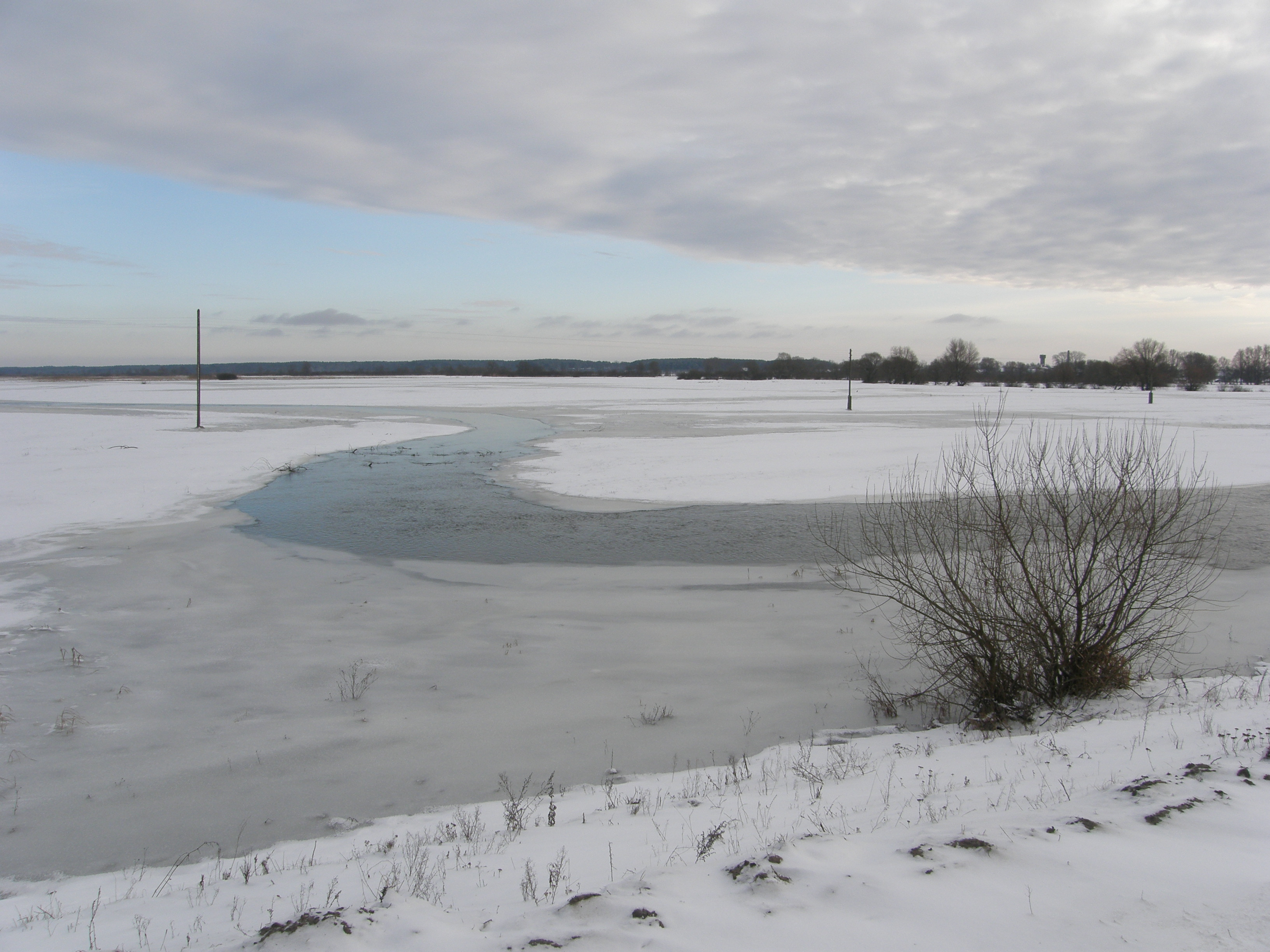

- Location within Volyn Oblast Location within Ukraine

Physical characteristics
- Source
  - coordinates: 50.8075°N 24.8657°E
- Mouth: Pripyat River
  - coordinates: 51°51′27″N 25°38′03″E
- Length: 188 km (117 mi)
- Basin size: 3,150 km^{2} (1,220 sq mi)

Basin features
- Progression: Pripyat→ Dnieper→ Dnieper–Bug estuary→ Black Sea

The Stokhid (also written Stokhod, according to the Russian name; Ukrainian: Стохід) is a river in Volyn Oblast, Ukraine. It is a right tributary of the Pripyat River. It is 188 kilometres (117 mi) long, and has a drainage basin of 3,150 km^{2} (1,220 sq mi).

== Description ==
Stokhid is the longest and cleanest river in Volyn. The valley in the upper reaches is clearly delineated, up to 4-4.5 km wide. Below it is more indistinct, up to 7–10 km wide. The floodplain is two-sided, swampy, from 0,4 km wide in the upper reaches to 2,5 km wide in the lower reaches. The heights are found mainly to the upper reaches, where the width is 20–25 m, and the depth is 0.5-1.5 m. Especially below the village of Zayachivka it is divided into numerous sleeves (hence the name - "stoop") in the width of 5– 15 m (at most - 60 m), depth up to 8–26 m (on plyas). The largest depth is 16.4 m, which is located between Lyubeshiv and the village. Zinov, the depth formed by the sources that feed the river; there are many elders. The largest settlement near the river is the city of Liubeshiv. Along a 50 km stretch, the river is deepened and straightened. The river freezes in December and thaws in March – which increases the flow.

The mineralization of the water of the river Stokhid is on average: spring flood - 440 mg / dm³; summer-autumn measurements - 465 mg / dm³; winter limits - 559 mg / dm³.

== Location ==
Stokhid originates near the village of Semerinskoe, Volyn Polissya, within the Volyn Highlands. It flows mainly to the northeast. It enters the Pripyat near the southern outskirts of the village Svalovichy.

Tributaries: Stobihivka, Yasinovka, Loknitsa (left); Aspen, Cheryah, Hryvka, Chervysh (right).

Above the river is the district center of Liubeshiv and the villages of Lokachi, Turiisk, Rozhyshche, Kovel, Manevychi, Kamin-Kashyrskyi and Liubeshiv raions.

The river flows through the National Nature Park "Pripyat-Stokhid".

== History ==
Above the Stokhid was the front line from June 1916 to August 1917 between the Austro-Hungarian-German and Russian troops.

In the First World War, after the Brusilov breakthrough (the main hostilities took place within the Volyn region), along the river Stokhid and Pripyat there was a defensive line lasting almost a year between the Russian and Austro-German troops. On the left bank, the latter created trenches and concrete ditches, serviced by a network of narrow-gauge railways for the transport of ammunition. On the right bank were Russian troops, whose defensive works were wooden and of which nothing has therefore survived.

In the years of the First World War, there were several changes to the front line on the Volhynia between the Russians and the Austro-German troops. In June 1916, Russian troops under the command of General Brusilov broke through the front, took Lutsk and pushed the Austro-German troops to the Stokhid River line. For more than a year, the front adhered to this line, resulting in the destruction of many nearby settlements. During the Brusilov breakthrough, about 1 million Austro-Germans and 500,000 Russian troops died. All the surrounding villages around Stokhid were completely destroyed. Russian troops tried to break through Stokhid again, but in vain.

The swampy valleys and banks of the Stokhid River became the grave of thousands of soldiers and officers of the Russian Imperial Guard and the Austro-Hungarian and German forces. This operation is called the "Stokhid meat grinder" by historians. Oral evidence from local inhabitants indicates that in the late 1920s, men came from Germany to rebury their compatriots in a cemetery in the village of Polyana, two kilometers from the Loviš.

== Bibliography ==
- Encyclopedia of Ukrainian Studies: Dictionary part: [in 11 volumes] / Scientific society named after Shevchenko; Goal. Ed. Prof. Dr. Volodymyr Kubiyovych. - Paris; New York: Young Life; Lviv; Kyiv: Globus, 1955–2003.
- Peter Kravchuk "The book of records of Volyn", Lyubeshiv. 2005 ISBN 966-361-079-4.
- Peter Kravchuk Conflict around the dam
