= Zabolottia, Volyn Oblast =

Rural locality in Volyn Oblast, Ukraine

Zabolottia Заболоття
- Rural settlement
- Interactive map of Zabolottia
- Location in Volyn Oblast Location in Ukraine
- Coordinates: 51°38′07″N 24°14′39″E
- Country: Ukraine
- Oblast: Volyn Oblast
- Raion: Kovel Raion
- Hromada: Zabolottia settlement hromada

Population (2022)
  - Total: 4,383
- Time zone: UTC+2 (EET)
  - Summer (DST): UTC+3 (EEST)

Zabolottia (Ukrainian: Заболоття; Polish: Zabłocie) is a rural settlement in Kovel Raion, Volyn Oblast, western Ukraine. It is located close to the border with Belarus, on the west shore of Lake Turske in the drainage basin of the Western Bug. Population: 4,383 (2022 estimate).

== History ==
The first written mention of this area dates back to 1501.

Zabolottya acquired the status of an urban-type settlement in 1957. Since 1991, the settlement has become a border settlement, with a customs post and border control points operating on the territory of the settlement.

Until 26 January 2024, Zabolottia was designated urban-type settlement. On this day, a new law entered into force which abolished this status, and Zabolottia became a rural settlement.

== Geography ==
The area of the village is 53,82 km^{2}. Holovne is located on the Polesian Lowland in Volyn Polissya. The village is located among mixed forests, swamps, and lakes. Lake Turskoye is located on the eastern outskirts of the village. The area around the village has a drainage system.

The climate of the region is moderately continental: winter is mild, with unstable frosts; summer is warm, not hot. Most often, comfortable weather is observed in the summer months. The formation of stable snow cover is noted in the second decade of December. The average height of the snow cover can reach 10 cm.

The soils are mainly sod-podzolic, peat bogs, and swampy.

The area around Holovne has reserves of silt, sapropel, peat.

== Economy ==
=== Transportation ===
Zabolottia railway station is on the railway connecting Kovel and Brest. There is infrequent passenger traffic to Kovel.The settlement has access, via Ratne, to Highway M19 connecting Chernivtsi via Ternopil and Lutsk with Kovel.
