= Horokhiv Raion =

Former subdivision of Volyn Oblast, Ukraine

Coordinates: 50°30′00″N 24°47′00″E

Horokhiv Rayon Горохівський район
- Raion
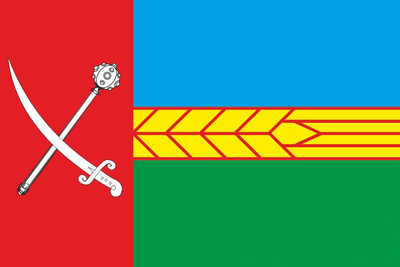
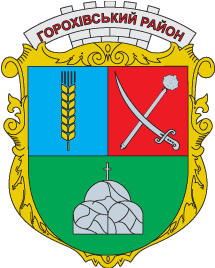
- Flag Coat of arms

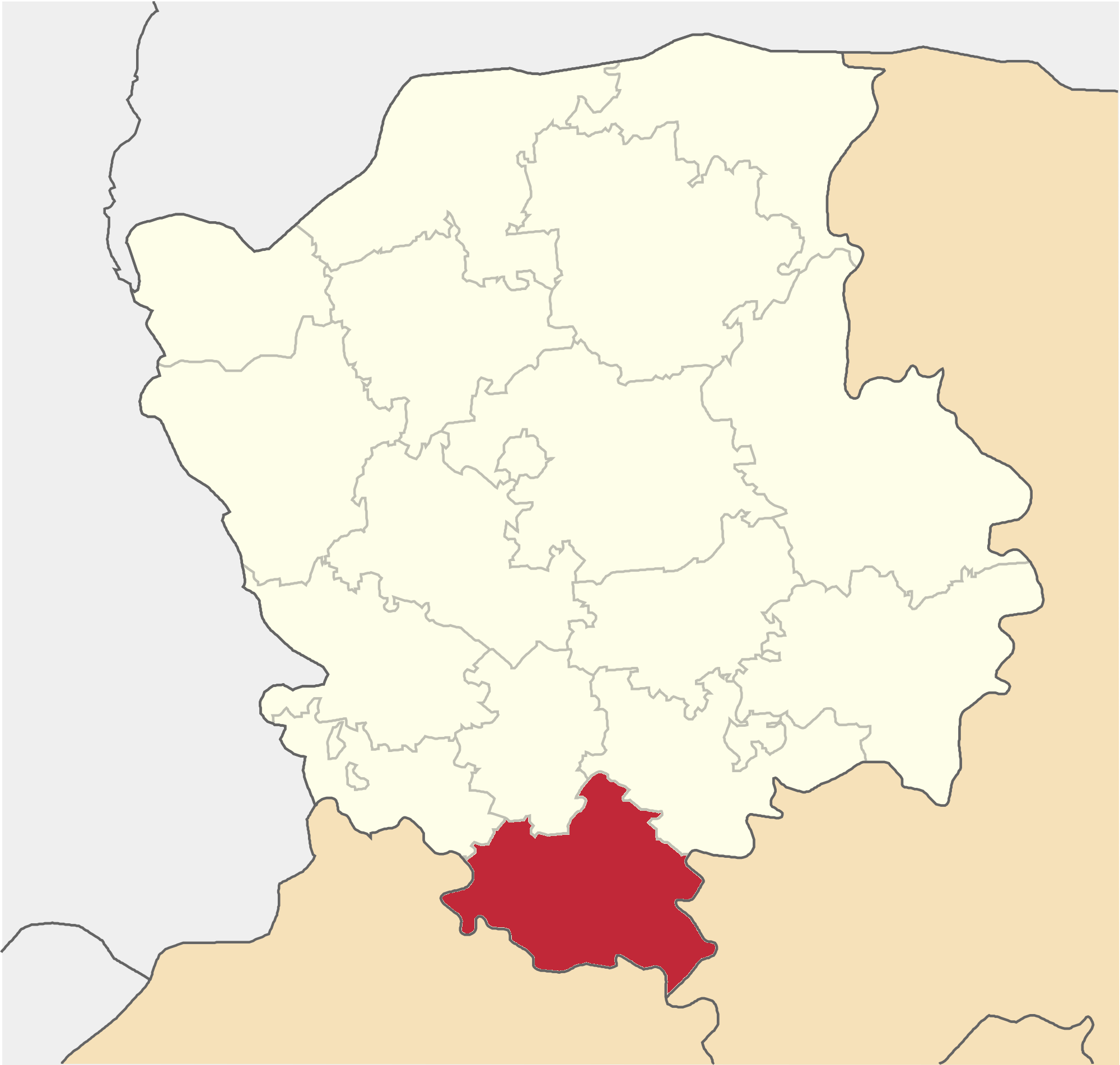
- Country: Ukraine
- Oblast: Volyn Oblast
- Established: 20 January 1940
- Disestablished: 18 July 2020
- Admin. center: Horokhiv
- Subdivisions: List: 2 — city councils; 2 — settlement councils; 36 — rural councils; Number of localities: 2 — cities; 2 — urban-type settlements; 90 — villages; 0 — rural settlements

Government
  - Governor: Yaroslav Dovgopolov

Area
  - Total: 1,122 km^{2} (433 sq mi)

Population (2020)
  - Total: 50,220
  - Density: 44.76/km^{2} (115.9/sq mi)
- Time zone: UTC+02:00 (EET)
  - Summer (DST): UTC+03:00 (EEST)
- Postal index: 457XX
- Area code: 380

Horokhiv Raion (Ukrainian: Горохівський район) was a raion in Volyn Oblast in western Ukraine. Its administrative center was the town of Horokhiv. The raion was abolished and its territory was merged into Lutsk Raion on 18 July 2020 as part of the administrative reform of Ukraine, which reduced the number of raions of Volyn Oblast to four. The last estimate of the raion population was 50,220 (2020 est.)

The raion was created on 20 January 1940 within former Polish territories that had been annexed by the Soviet Union after its invasion of Poland. The raion consisted of the southern portion of the Horokhow county of the Polish Volhynia Voivodeship. The county's northern portion became the Lokachi Raion.

== Populated places ==
=== Cities ===
- Horokhiv (Горохів)
- Berestechko (Берестечко)

=== Urban-type settlements ===
- Mar'yanivka (Мар'янівка)
- Senkevychivka (Сенкевичівка)

=== Villages ===
- Halychany (Галичани)
