= Liubeshiv Raion =

Former subdivision of Volyn Oblast, Ukraine

Liubeshiv Raion Любешівський район
- Raion
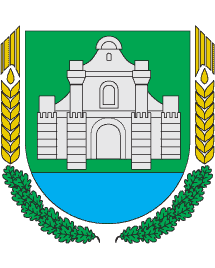
- Flag Coat of arms

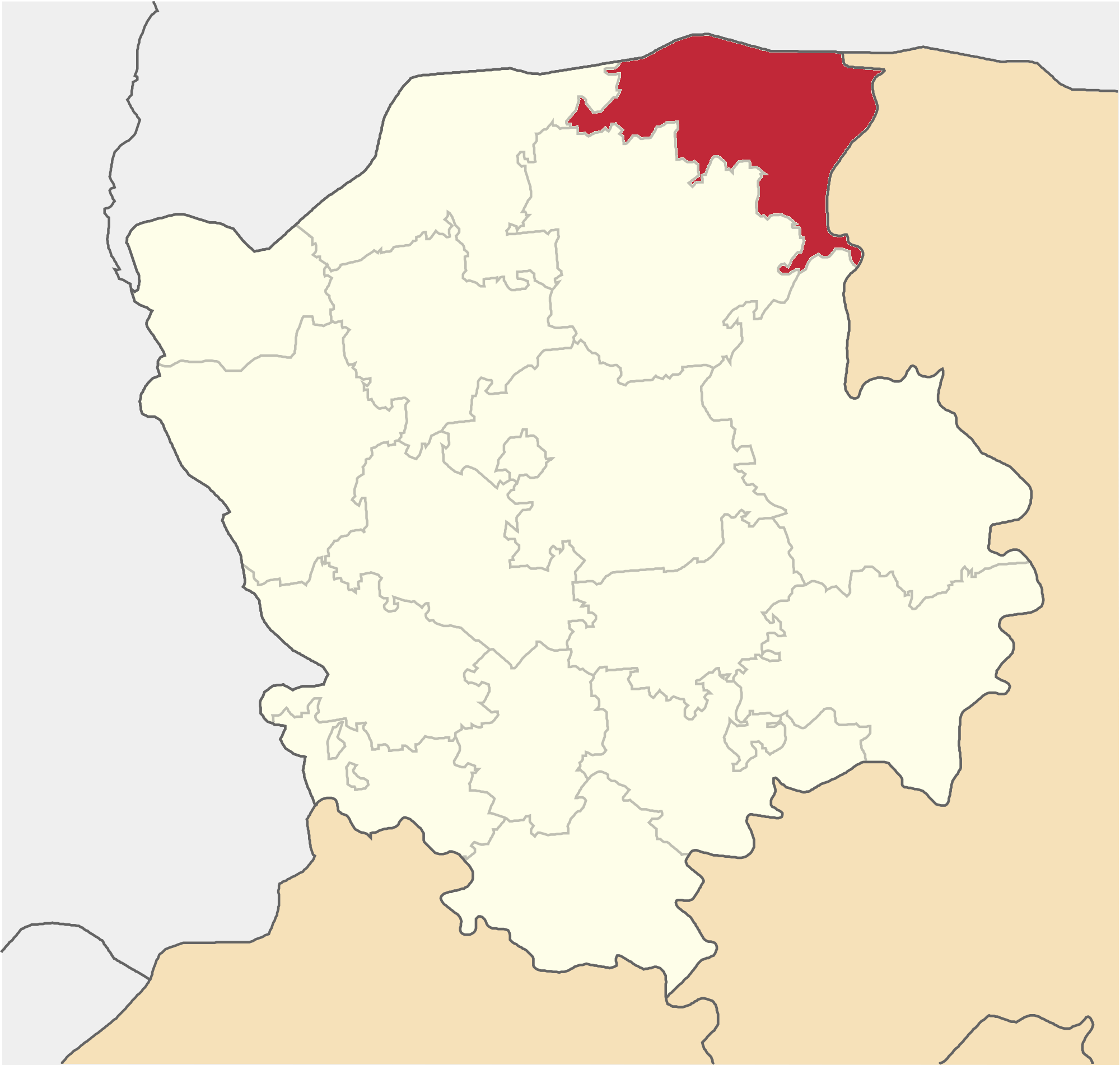
- Coordinates: 51°48′00″N 25°21′00″E
- Country: Ukraine
- Oblast: Volyn Oblast
- Established: 1965
- Disestablished: 18 July 2020
- Admin. center: Liubeshiv
- Subdivisions: List: — city councils; — settlement councils; — rural councils; Number of localities: — cities; — urban-type settlements; 46 — villages; — rural settlements

Area
  - Total: 1,450 km^{2} (560 sq mi)

Population (2020)
  - Total: 35,134
  - Density: 24.2/km^{2} (62.8/sq mi)
- Time zone: UTC+02:00 (EET)
  - Summer (DST): UTC+03:00 (EEST)
- Area code: 380-3362
- Website: http://www.lbsadm.gov.ua/ Lyubeshivskyi Raion

Liubeshiv Raion (Ukrainian: Любешівський район) was a raion in Volyn Oblast in western Ukraine. Its administrative center was the urban-type settlement of Liubeshiv. The raion was abolished and its territory was merged into Kamin-Kashyrskyi Raion on 18 July 2020 as part of the administrative reform of Ukraine, which reduced the number of raions of Volyn Oblast to four. The last estimate of the raion population was 35,134 (2020 est.)

== See also ==
- Administrative divisions of Volyn Oblast
