= Liublynets =

Rural locality in Volyn Oblast, Ukraine

Liublynets Люблинець
- Rural settlement
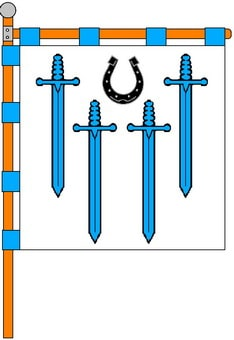
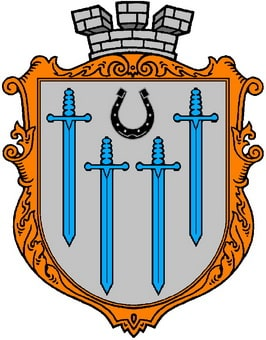
- Flag Coat of arms
- Interactive map of Liublynets
- Location in Volyn Oblast Location in Ukraine
- Coordinates: 51°11′00″N 24°37′13″E
- Country: Ukraine
- Oblast: Volyn Oblast
- Raion: Kovel Raion
- Hromada: Liublynets settlement hromada

Population (2022)
  - Total: 4,429
- Time zone: UTC+2 (EET)
  - Summer (DST): UTC+3 (EEST)

Liublynets (Ukrainian: Люблинець; Polish: Lubliniec) is a rural settlement in Kovel Raion, Volyn Oblast, western Ukraine. It is essentially a suburb of the city of Kovel and is located approximately five kilometres (3.1 mi) southwest of the city. Population: 4,429 (2022 estimate).

== History ==
The name of the village comes from the road that passed near it and led to Lublin.

Following the German-Soviet invasion of Poland, which started World War II in September 1939, the village was occupied by the Soviet Union until 1941 and then by Germany until 1944. In October-November 1943, Ukrainians murdered four local Poles, as part of the massacres of Poles in Volhynia and Eastern Galicia. The victims are buried at the Roman Catholic cemetery in nearby Kovel. In 1944, it was re-occupied by the Soviet Union, and included within the Ukrainian Soviet Socialist Republic.

Since January 26, 2024, the urban-type settlement of Lubliniec has acquired the status of a village.

Until 26 January 2024, Liublynets was designated urban-type settlement. On this day, a new law entered into force which abolished this status, and Liublynets became a rural settlement. As of 01.01.2025, there are 1377 households in the village.

== Geography ==
The village of Lublinets is located southwest of the outskirts of the city of Kovel. The village is located in Volyn Polisya, on the Polesian Lowland, in a zone of mixed forests. The distance to the district center (Kovel) by road is 11 km, and by rail - 11 km. The village is located on the left bank of the Turia River.

== Symbolism on the coat of arms ==
The silver field of the coat of arms means the chalk deposits in the village, and the four blue swords with the tips down - 4 Lublin armorial knights who owned lands in the village. In the center of the coat of arms between the two middle swords - a horseshoe, which symbolizes happiness and administrative affiliation to the Kovel district. The author of the coat of arms and flag - Andriy Hrechylo.

== Economy ==
=== Transportation ===
Liublynets-Volynskyi railway station is on the railway connecting Lviv via Volodymyr with Kovel. There is infrequent passenger traffic.

The settlement is connected by road with Kovel and Volodymyr. In Kovel, it has access to Highway M07 connecting Kyiv via Korosten with Kovel, as well as to Highway M19 connecting Chernivtsi via Ternopil and Lutsk with Kovel.
