= Kamin-Kashyrskyi =

City in Volyn Oblast, Ukraine

Kamin-Kashyrskyi Камінь-Каширський
- City
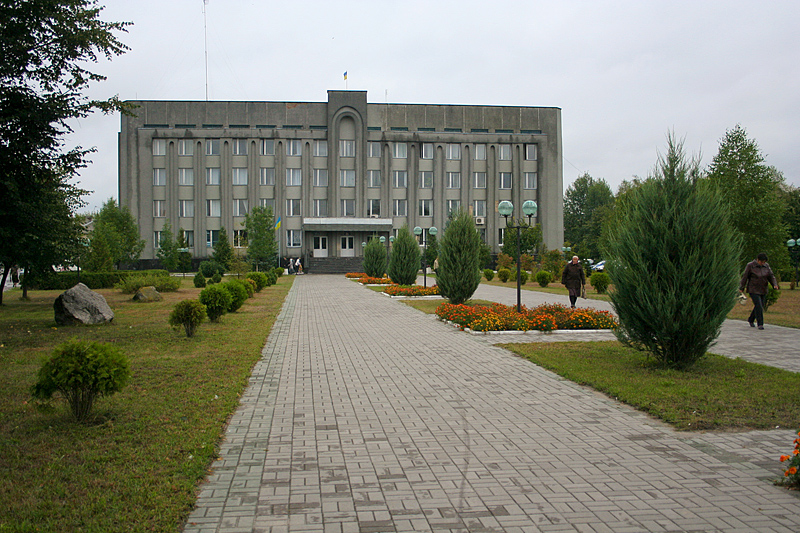
- District administration in Kamin-Kashyrskyi

- Flag Coat of arms

- Location within Volyn Oblast Location within Ukraine
- Coordinates: 51°37′12″N 24°57′55″E
- Country: Ukraine
- Oblast: Volyn Oblast
- Raion: Kamin-Kashyrskyi Raion
- Hromada: Kamin-Kashyrskyi urban hromada

Government
  - Mayor: Stepan Nikitchuk Onufriyovych
- Elevation: 155 m (509 ft)

Population (2023)
  - Total: 11,713

Kamin-Kashyrskyi (Ukrainian: Камінь-Каширський [ˈkɑminʲ kɐˈʃɪrsʲkɪi̯]) is a city in Volyn Oblast, in north-western Ukraine. It is the administrative center of Kamin-Kashyrskyi Raion. Population: 12,477 (2022 estimate).

== Name ==
"Kamiń" means stone in Ukrainian. The second part of the name, Kashyrskyi (Koshirskyi, Kosherskyi), comes from the fact that the city was for some time owned by the princes Sanguszko - Koszerski, who called themselves Kosherskyi after the name of their family nest Kosher. When the last of the Sangushki-Koshersky family, Adam-Olexandr, died without male heirs, the Krasytskyi, the new owners of Kamen, began to call it Kamen-Koshirsky to distinguish it from other settlements with that name.

M. Teodorovych writes in his book that on the site of modern Kamin-Kashyrskyi, there was a fortress for the northern protection of the borders of Volodymyr-Volhynia Principality and it was called Kamen, and the town around it - Kosher. These names later merged.

The change of "o" to "a" in the word "Koshirsky" occurred as a result of Russian-language influence (see akanye).

== Geography ==
The city is located upon the Tsyr river, a tributary of Prypiat, in the western part of Polesia.

== History ==
Great Soviet Encyclopedia says "Kamen-Kashirskiy is on the river Zyr, a tributary of the River Prypiat the town was known already at the beginning of the 12th. Century. Situated in Volyn."

As of 1366, Kamień was a Polish stronghold on the border with Lithuania. It was a private town of the Sanguszko and Krasicki families. In 1628, Adam Sanguszko founded a Dominican monastery in the town.

In 1795, as a result of the Third Partition of Poland, the town was annexed by the Russian Empire, within which it was administratively located in the Volhynian Governorate. It saw an influx of Jews as a result of Russian discriminatory policies (see Pale of Settlement).

The Encyclopaedia Judaica comments: "Kamen-Kashirskiy, a small town in Poland, the county of Polesia. In 1847 there were 862 Jews living there; in 1897 there were 1189 Jews (in a total of 1220 residents); in 1921 – 716 Jews."

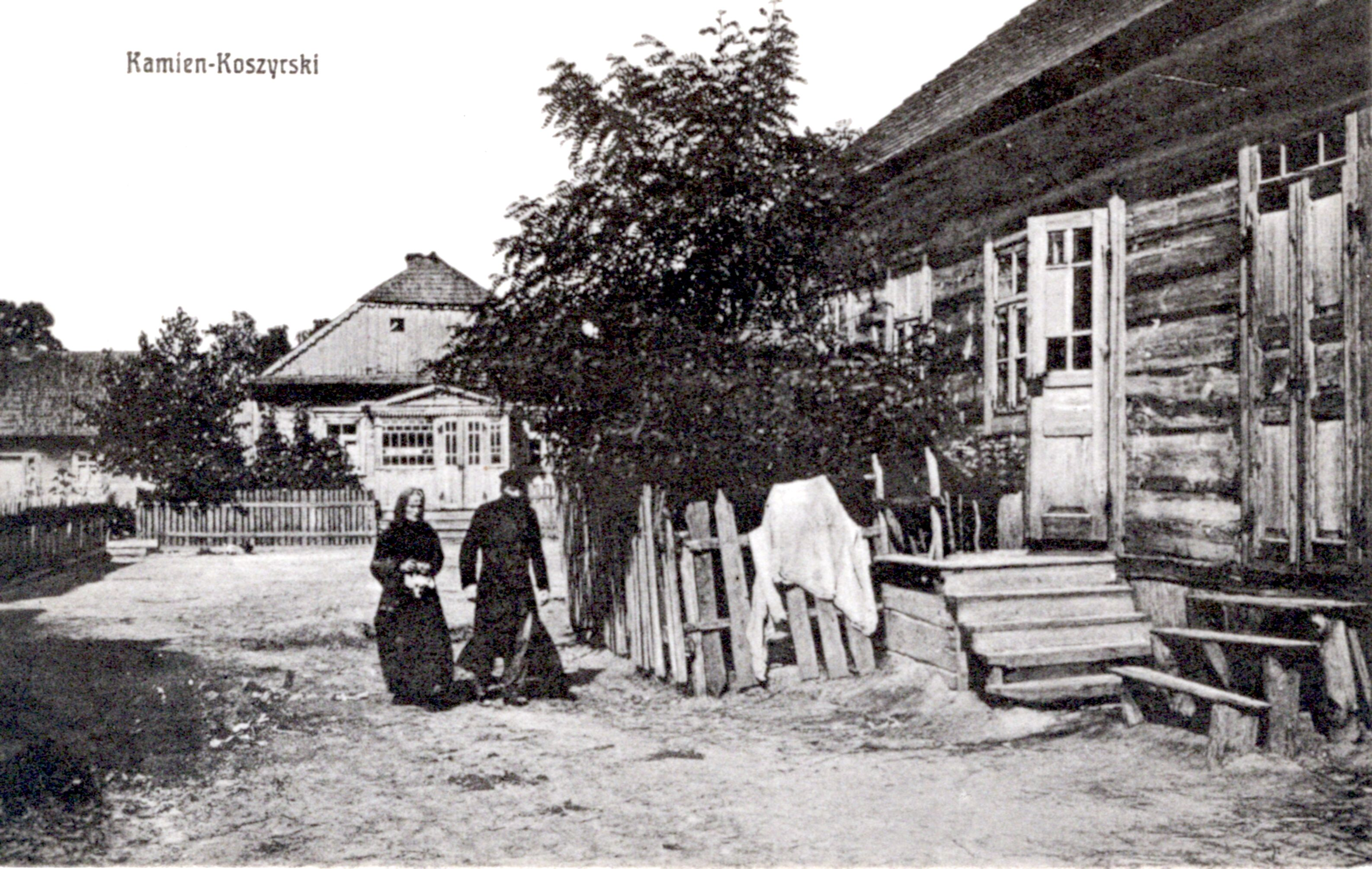
Kamień Koszyrski during the First World War

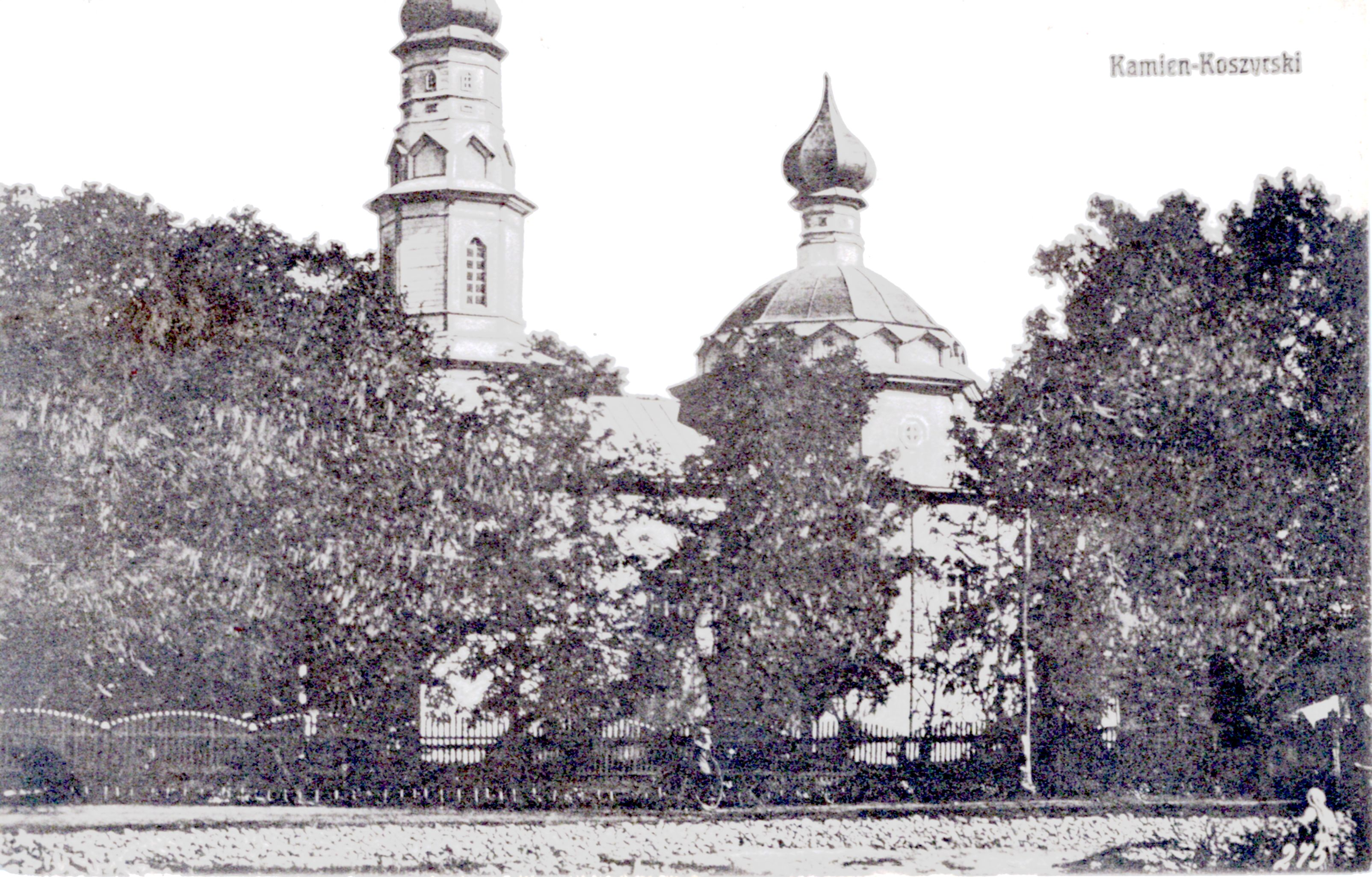
Church in Kamin Koshyrskiy circa WWI

During WWI, German soldiers sent postcards with photographs of the town and town life. They depict churches, dwellings, and town life. In 1917, German soldiers were in the town building a Feldbahn (or Lorenbahn) station. The Feldbahn were narrow-gauge field railways used for transporting goods (usually not open to the public).

It was part of Second Polish Republic between 1919 and 1939 was a county seat in Polesie Voivodeship.

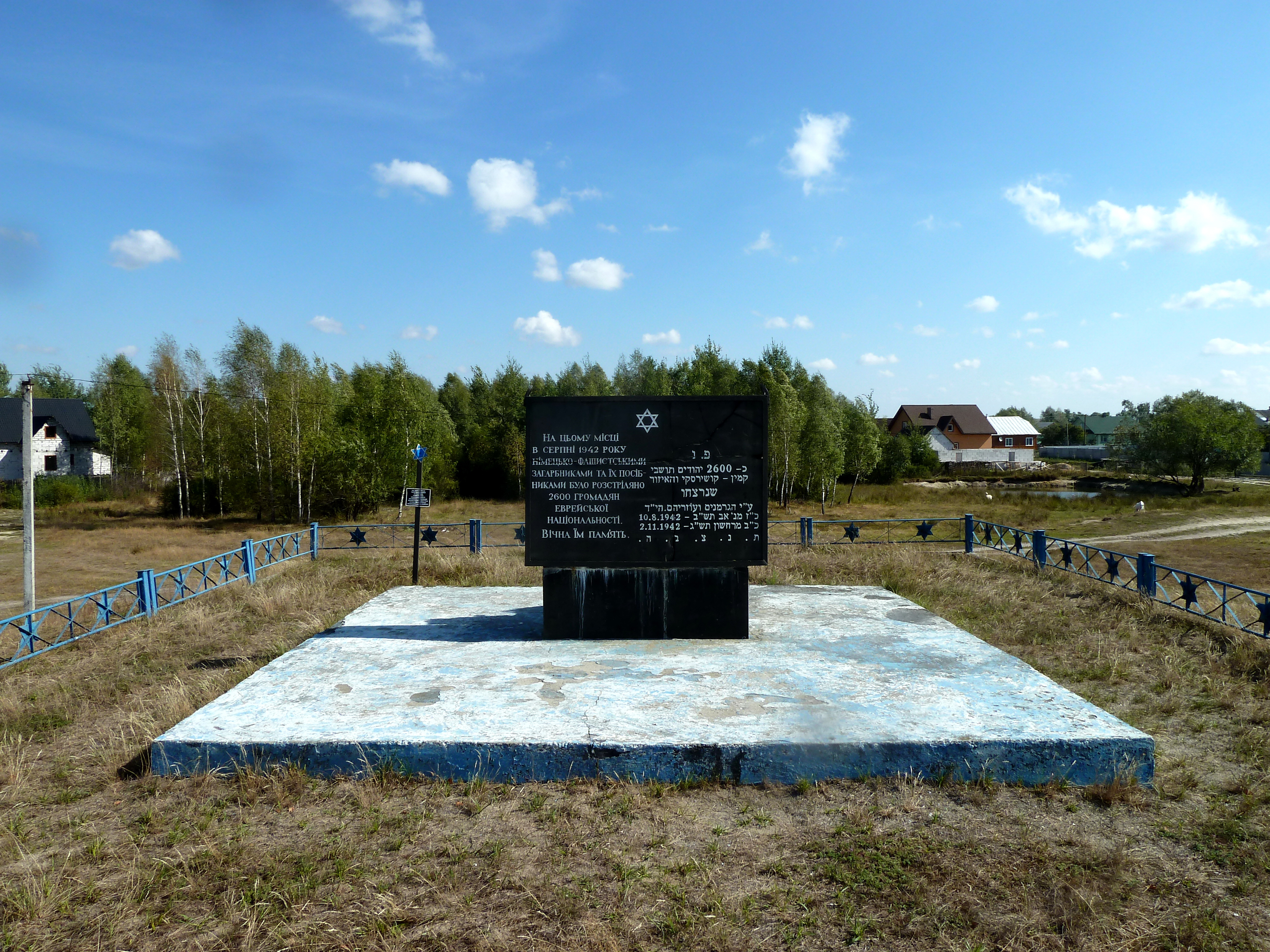
Holocaust memorial

Just prior to the outbreak of World War II on September 1, 1939, it is estimated that more than 2,000 Jewish people lived in the town. Following the joint German-Soviet invasion of Poland it was initially occupied by the Soviet Union, then by Nazi Germany from 1941. On August 1, 1941, a squadron of the 2nd Cavalry Regiment arrived in the town from Ratno. One day later, they arrested and shot eight Jewish men. On August 22, 1941, a detachment of the Security Police subordinated to Einsatzgruppe C arrested all Jewish males aged between 16 and 60. The next day, they shot 80 Jewish men in a forest 5 kilometers west of the town. In the fall of 1941, all Jewish people were ordered to inhabit an "open ghetto" but in March 1942, by the order of the Gebietskommissar, it became an "enclosed ghetto". Altogether, 2,300 Jewish people resided in the ghetto area. The first mass action was perpetrated on August 10, 1942, by the German Security Police from Brześć with the assistance of the local German Gendarmerie and the Ukrainian Auxiliary Police. Some 50 families were shot in the Jewish cemetery as well as 130 Romani people. On November 2, 1942, 400 Jewish people escaped from the ghetto. Most of local Jews soon died of starvation or disease in the forest. The Towns as They Were in Their Time and Place In 1944, the town was re-occupied by the Soviet Union, and eventually annexed from Poland the following year, and included within the Volyn Oblast of the Ukrainian SSR.

== Demographics ==
The area has been historically a mix of Polish, Belarusian and Ukrainian peoples for more than a millennium. Major religions practiced include: Catholic, Russian Orthodox, Ukrainian Orthodox, and Judaism. At the turn of the century, 1900, the area was reported to be populated by villages of Christian farmers and a few Jewish villages engaged in trade, as artisans and as professionals.

=== Ukrainian census in 2001 ===
As of the 2001 Ukrainian census, Kamin-Kashyrskyi had a population of 8,847 inhabitants. The ethnic and linguitic composition of the local population according to the census was as follows:

Ethnic groups in Kamin-Kashyrskyi
| | percent |
| Ukrainians | 98.71% |
| Russians | 0.96% |
| Belarusians | 0.19% |
| others | 0.14% |

Native languages in Kamin-Kashyrskyi
| | percent |
| Ukrainian | 99.1% |
| Russian | 0.8% |
| Belarusian | 0.1% |
| others | 0.0% |

== Economy ==
Kamin-Kashyrskyi is a centre of wood procession industry.

== Gallery ==
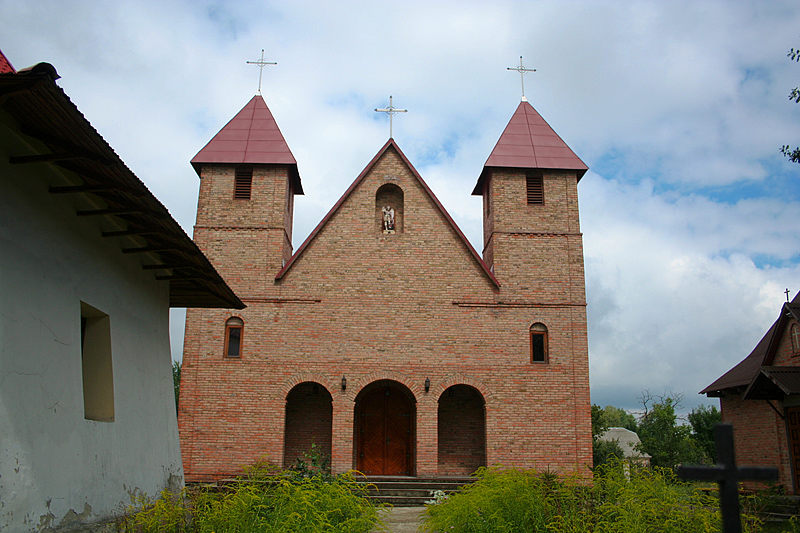
Catholic church in Kamin-Kasyrskyi

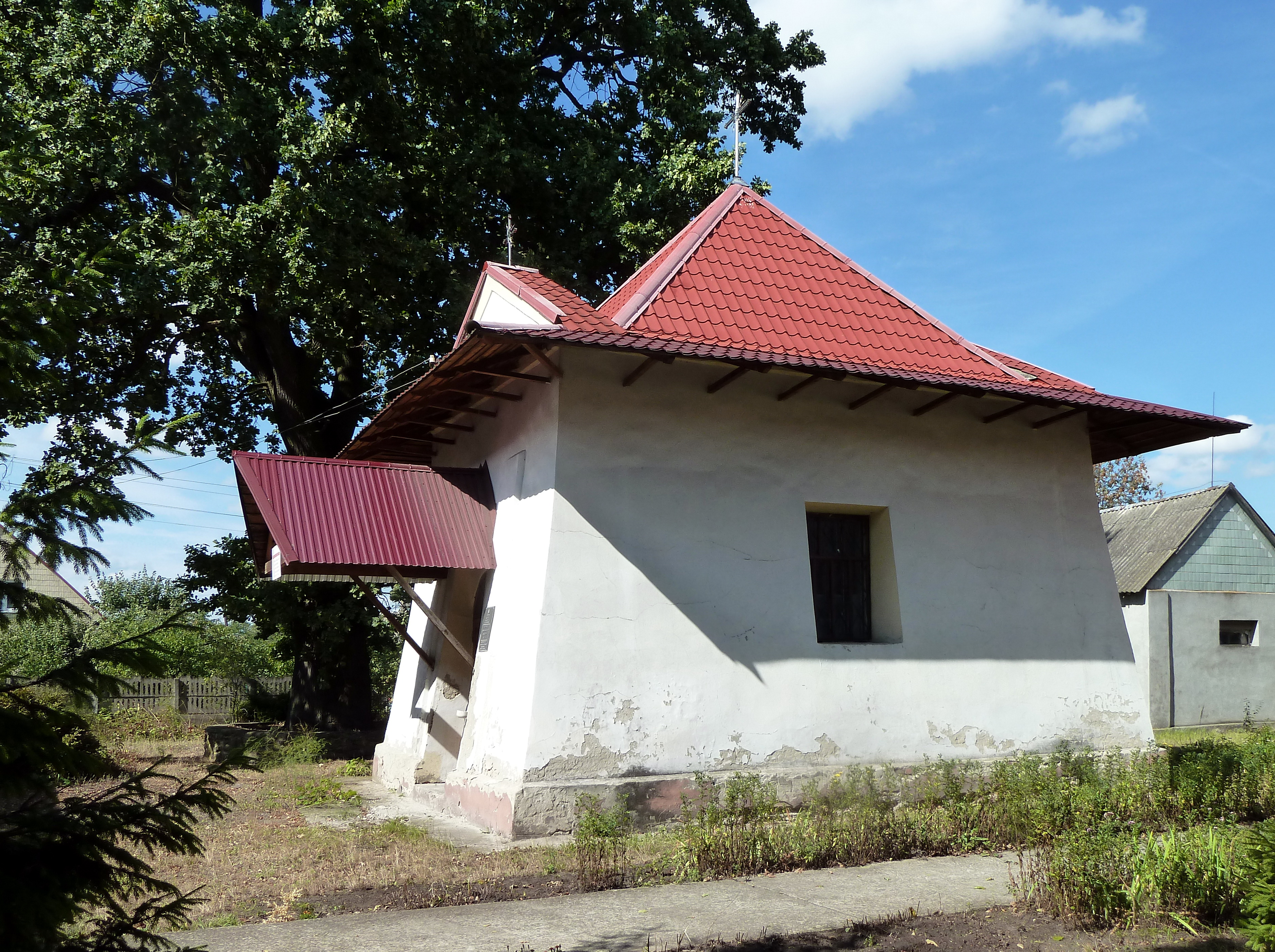
Chapel of the former Dominican monastery

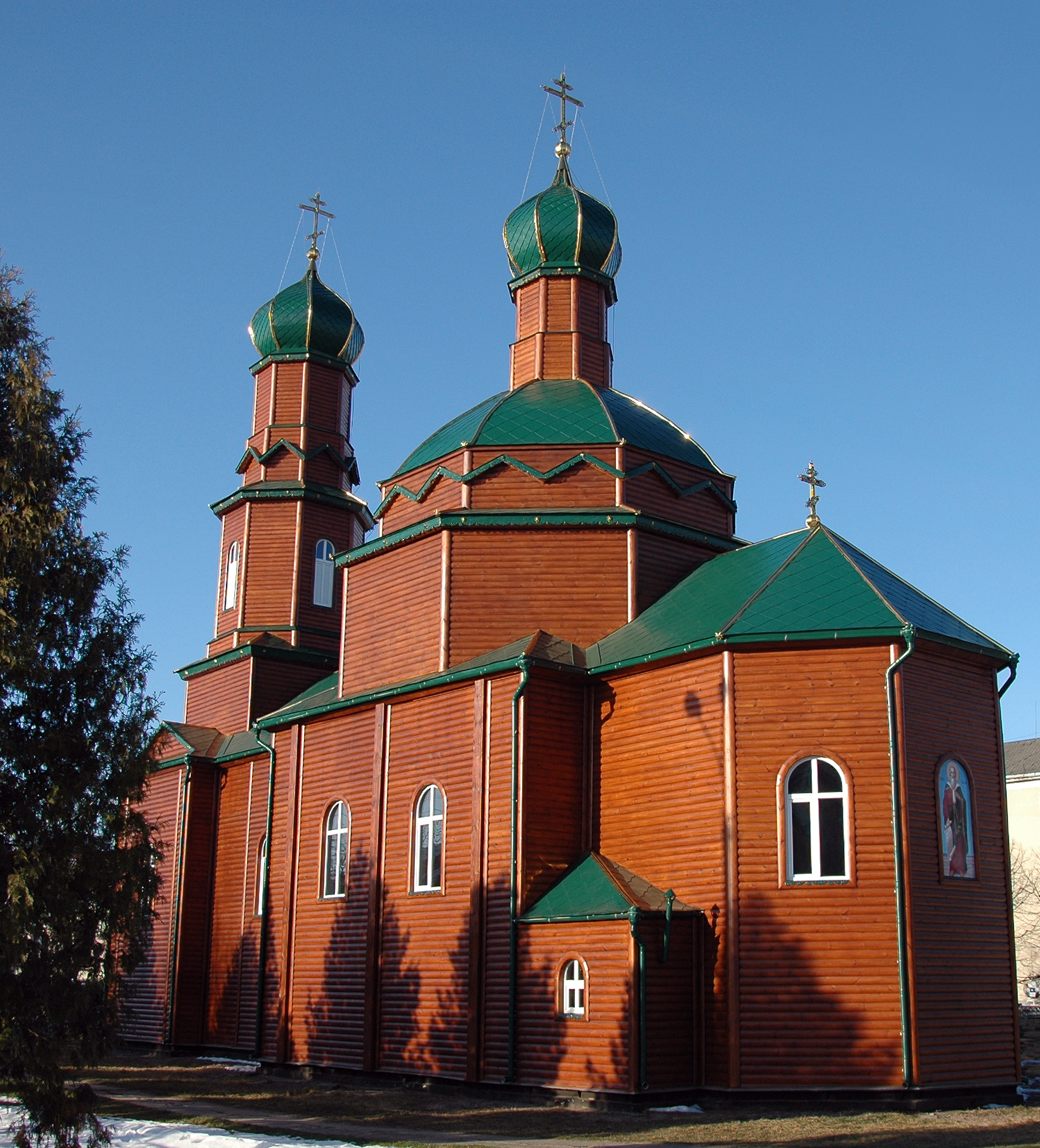
St. Elijah orthodox church

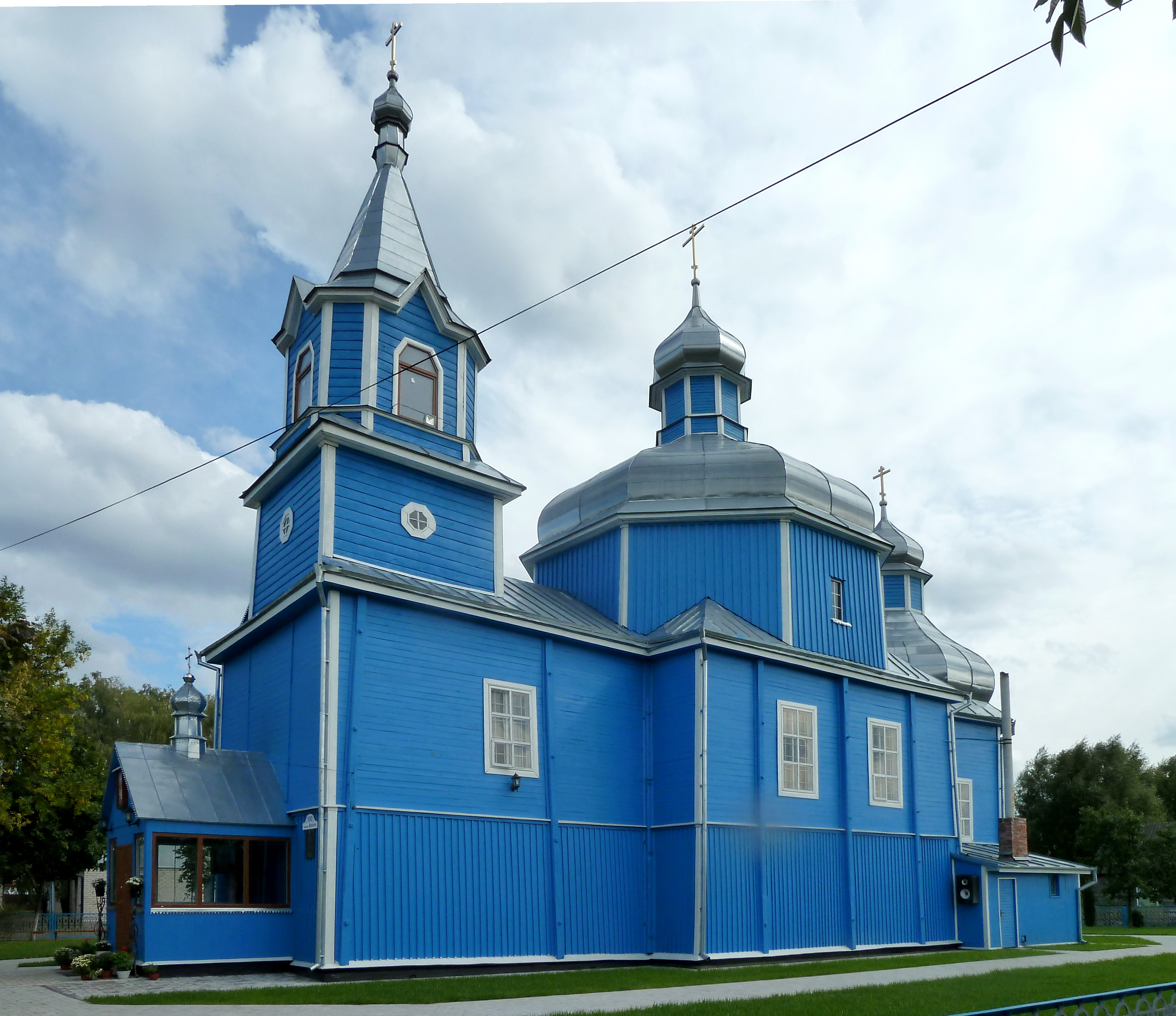
Nativity of the Theotokos Orthodox Church
