= Halychany, Volyn Oblast =

Halychany Галичани
- Interactive map of Halychany
- Coordinates: 50°26′8″N 24°54′10″E

Halychany (Ukrainian: Галичани) is a village in Lutsk Raion, Volyn Oblast, Ukraine, but was formerly administered within Horokhiv Raion.
