= Dmytro Abramovych =

Soviet historian and writer (1893–1968)

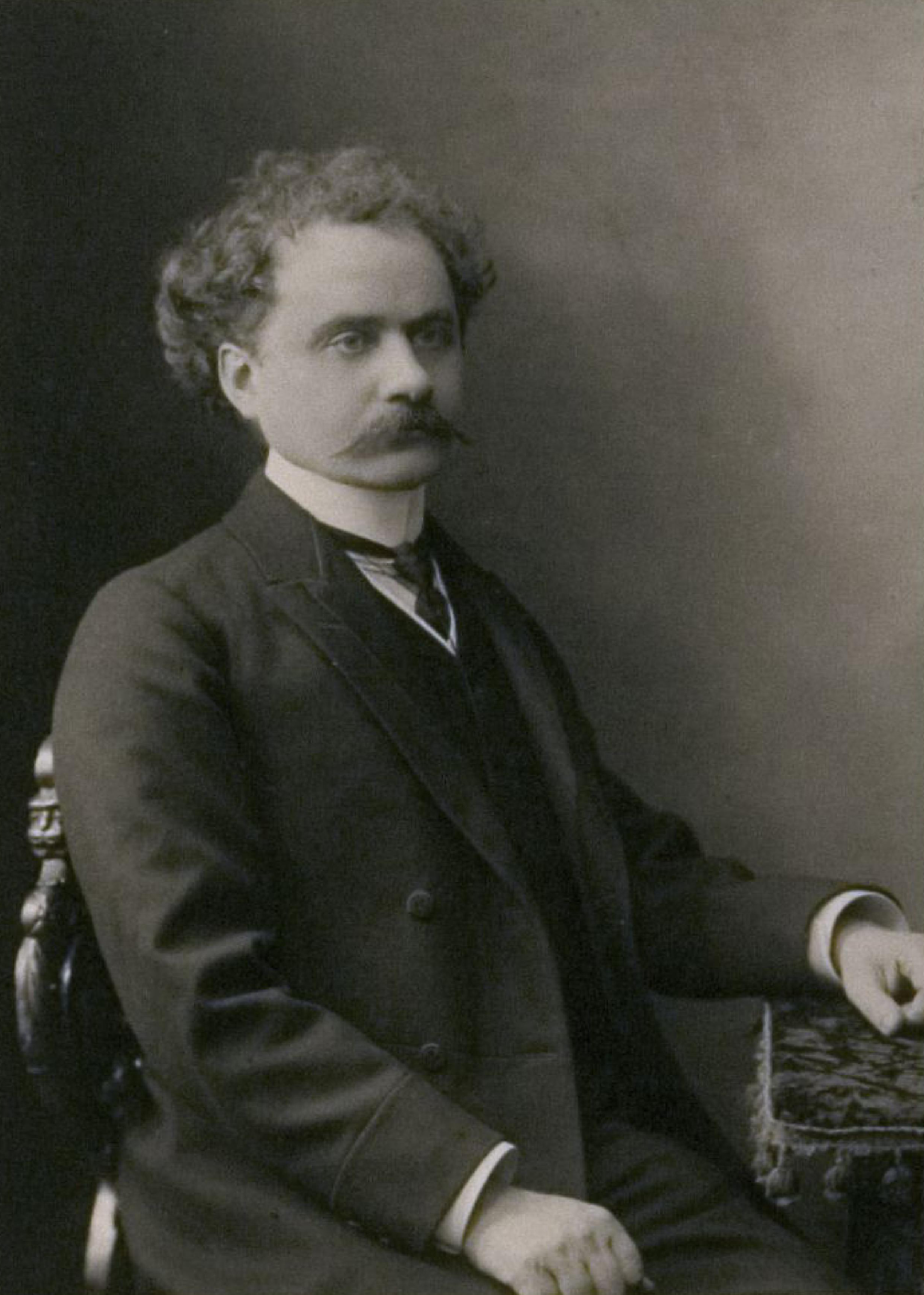
Dmitry Ivanovich Abramovich

Dmitry Ivanovich Abramovich (Russian: Дми́трий Ива́нович Абрамо́вич, 7 August 1873, Hulivka, Volhynian Governorate – 4 March 1955, Vilnius) was a Soviet historian and writer.

== Works ==
- Abramovych, Dmytro, ed. (1916). "Чтение о Святых Мучениках Борисе и Глебе Chtenie o Svjatykh Muchenykakh Borise i Glebe" [Reading about the Holy Martyrs Boris and Gleb]. Жития святых мучеников Бориса и Глеба, и службы им Zhitija svjatykh muchenikov Borisa i Gleba, i sluzhby im [Lives of the holy martyrs Boris and Gleb, and services to them] (in Russian). Azbuka. (based on the oldest manuscript, the 14th-century Silvestrovskij sbornik)
