= Rozhyshche Raion =

Former subdivision of Volyn Oblast, Ukraine

Rozhyshche Raion Рожищенський район
- Raion
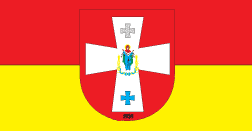
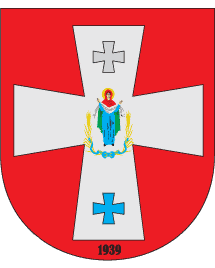
- Flag Coat of arms

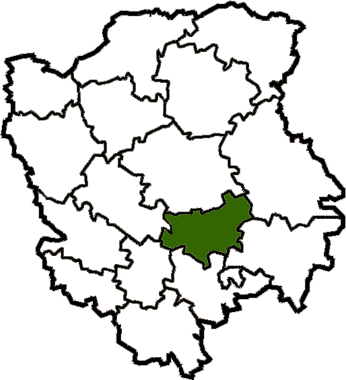
- Coordinates: 50°54′00″N 25°18′00″E
- Country: Ukraine
- Oblast: Volyn Oblast
- Established: 1940
- Disestablished: 18 July 2020
- Admin. center: Rozhyshche
- Subdivisions: List: — city councils; — settlement councils; — rural councils; Number of localities: — cities; — urban-type settlements; 66 — villages; — rural settlements

Area
  - Total: 928 km^{2} (358 sq mi)

Population (2020)
  - Total: 38,359
  - Density: 41.3/km^{2} (107/sq mi)
- Time zone: UTC+02:00 (EET)
  - Summer (DST): UTC+03:00 (EEST)
- Area code: 380-3368
- Website: www.rozhysche.com

Rozhyshche Raion (Ukrainian: Рожищенський район) was a raion in Volyn Oblast in western Ukraine. Its administrative center was the town of Rozhyshche. The raion was abolished and its territory was merged into Lutsk Raion on 18 July 2020 as part of the administrative reform of Ukraine, which reduced the number of raions of Volyn Oblast to four. The last estimate of the raion population was 38,359 (2020 est.)

== See also ==
- Administrative divisions of Volyn Oblast
