= Kamin-Kashyrskyi Raion =

Subdivision of Volyn Oblast, Ukraine

Coordinates: 50°30′N 24°47′E

Kamin-Kashyrskyi Raion Камінь-Каширський район
- Raion
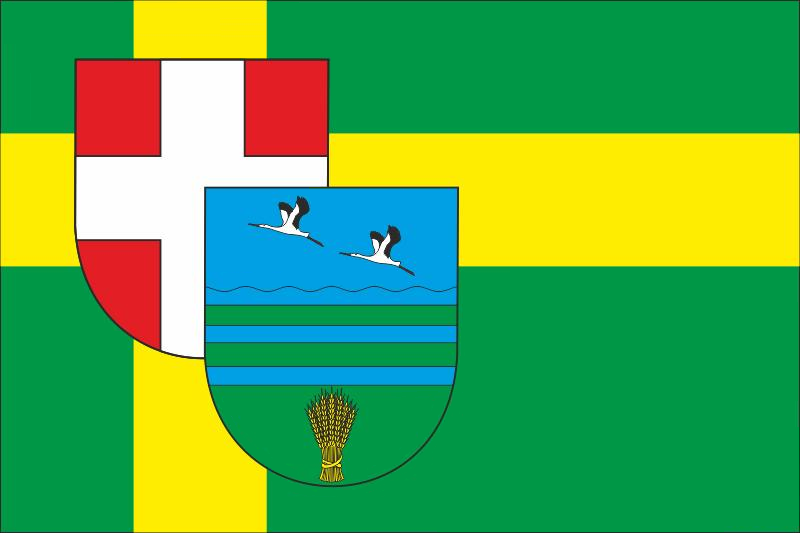
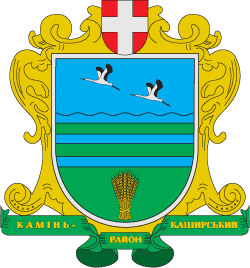
- Flag Coat of arms

- Interactive map of Kamin-Kashyrskyi Raion
- Country: Ukraine
- Oblast: Volyn Oblast
- Established: 1940
- Admin. center: Kamin-Kashyrskyi
- Subdivisions: 5 hromadas

Area
  - Total: 4,693.4 km^{2} (1,812.1 sq mi)

Population (2022)
  - Total: 130,382
  - Density: 27.780/km^{2} (71.950/sq mi)
- Time zone: UTC+02:00 (EET)
  - Summer (DST): UTC+03:00 (EEST)
- Area code: 380-3257
- Website: http://www.kamadm.gov.ua/ Kamin-Kashyrskyi Raion

Kamin-Kashyrskyi Raion (Ukrainian: Камінь-Каширський район) is a raion (district) in Volyn Oblast in western Ukraine. Its administrative center is the town of Kamin-Kashyrskyi. Population: 130,382 (2022 estimate).

On 18 July 2020, as part of the administrative reform of Ukraine, the number of raions of Volyn Oblast was reduced to four, and the area of Kamin-Kashyrskyi Raion was significantly expanded. The January 2020 estimate of the raion population was 32,552 (2020 est.).

== Geographic characteristics ==
Kamin-Kashyrskyi district is located on the Polesian Lowland in Volyn Polissya. The highest point of the district is 309 m located on the Volyn Range. The relief of the district is flat, partly lowland, covered with pine and oak forests. There are large areas of swamps. Kamin-Kashyrskyi district has reserves of silt, sapropel, peat.

The area of the district is 4679.7 km^{2}. The climate of the region is moderately continental: winter is mild, with unstable frosts; summer is warm, not hot. Most often, comfortable weather is observed in the summer months. The formation of stable snow cover is noted in the second decade of December. The average height of the snow cover can reach 10 cm.

Kamin-Kashyrskyi district is located in the basin of the Pripyat River, which flows into it in its northern part. Its right tributaries, the Turia and Stokhid, also flow through the Kamin-Kashyrskyi district. Lake Lyubyazy in the Pripyat floodplain is the largest lake (area 5.19 km²) in the Kamin-Kashirsky district.

Kamin-Kashyrskyi forests are rich in mushrooms and berries.Among the mushrooms, chanterelles, tricholoma equestre, suillus luteus, armillaria mellea, russula and porcini mushrooms predominate. The most common berries are blueberries, raspberries, and blackberries.

The Pripyat-Stokhid National Nature Park is located in the Kamin-Kashyrsky District in the Pripyat Valley and the lower reaches of the Stokhid. In the park, among the marshes, meadows, and forests, 21 species of plants listed in the Red Book of Ukraine grow, for example, common scutellum, blistered aldrovanda, floating salvinia, flesh-red, May and spotted palmate, annual plaun, etc.

== Communities of the district ==
Number of settlements 155. Number of cities – 1. The district includes 5 territorial communities. Urban communities are formed around the cities of Berestechko, Horokhiv, Kivertsi, Lutsk, Rozhyshche. The district consists of the Kamin-Kashyr, Lyubeshi, Manevytsk, Prylisnensk, Soshychnensk territorial communities.

== Transport ==
A number of important transport corridors pass through the district, including the European highway E373, which is the shortest road route from Warsaw to Kyiv. The railway in the district runs in the Kyiv-Kovel direction through the Manevichi railway station.

== See also ==
- Administrative divisions of Volyn Oblast

== Bibliography ==
- Національний атлас України/НАН України, Інститут географії, Державна служба геодезії, картографії та кадастру; голов. ред. Л. Г. Руденко; голова ред. кол.Б.Є. Патон. — К.: ДНВП «Картографія», 2007. — 435 с. — 5 тис.прим. — ISBN 978-966-475-067-4.
- Географічна енциклопедія України : [у 3 т.] / редкол.: О. М. Маринич (відповід. ред.) та ін. — К., 1989—1993. — 33 000 екз. — ISBN 5-88500-015-8.
