= Lokachi =

Rural settlement in Volyn Oblast, Ukraine

Lokachi Локачі
- Rural settlement
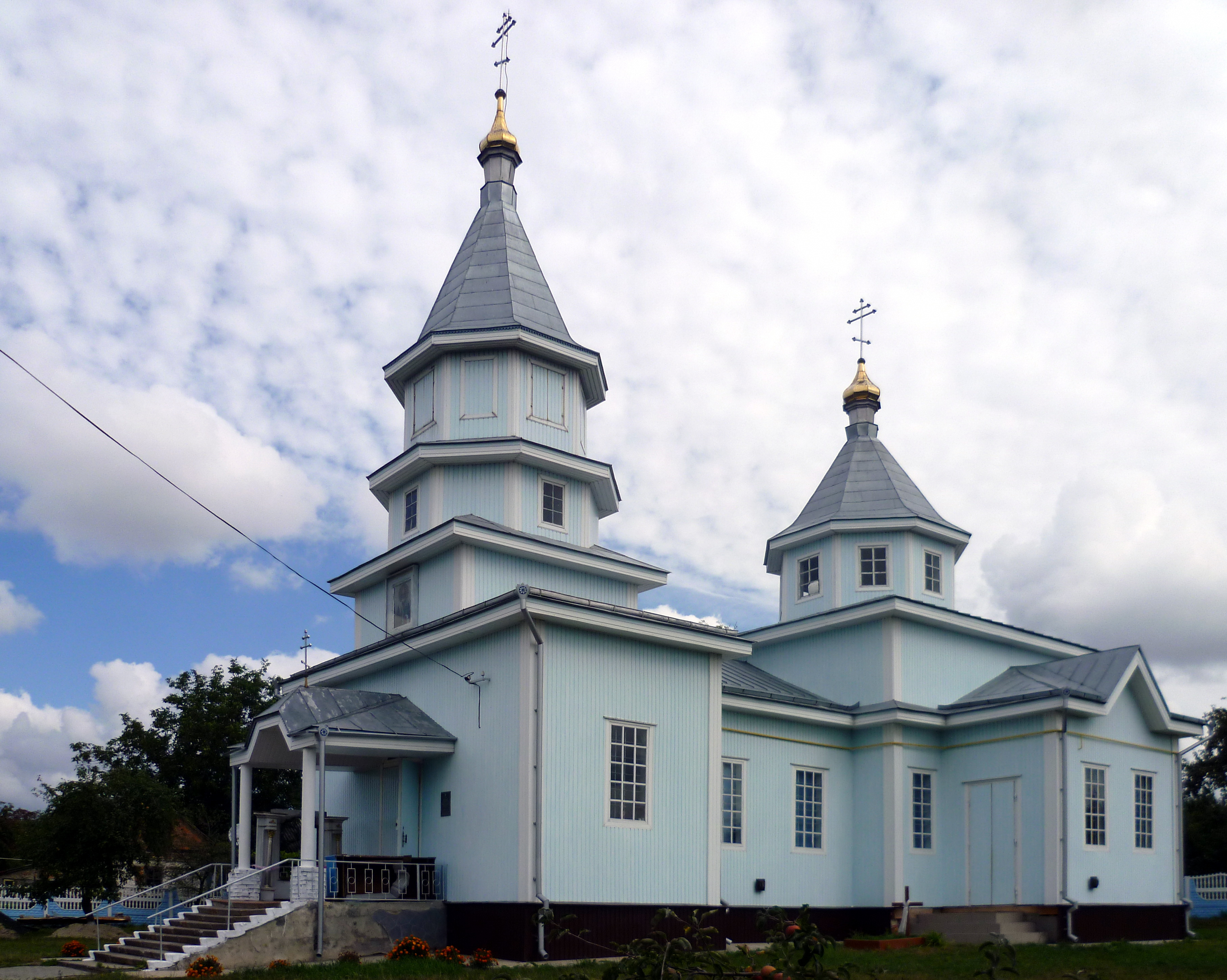
- Church of Saint Nicholas

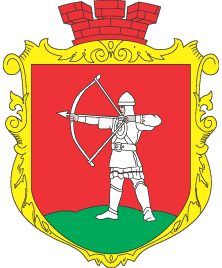
- Flag Coat of arms

- Location within Ukraine Location within Volyn Oblast
- Country: Ukraine
- Oblast: Volyn Oblast
- Raion: Volodymyr Raion
- Hromada: Lokachi settlement hromada

Population (2022)
  - Total: 3,698
- Time zone: UTC+2 (EET)
  - Summer (DST): UTC+3 (EEST)

Lokachi (Ukrainian: Локачі, Polish: Łokacze) is a rural settlement in Volyn Oblast, in the historic region of Volhynia. It is the administrative seat of Lokachi settlement hromada. Population: 3,698 (2022 estimate)

== History ==
It was a settlement in Vladimir-Volynsky Uyezd in Volhynian Governorate of the Russian Empire.

In June 1916, during the First World War, there was fighting in the vicinity between the forces of the Russian and Austrian Empires. This was part of the Brusilov Offensive.

In 1921, the Jewish population of the village was 1,265. The total population of the town in 1937 was 1,790.

The Axis occupied the town in June 1941. A Judenrat was soon established. The Jews were forced to move to a ghetto in November 1941. The ghetto started to be closed in with a fence in February 1942. Many Jews of the ghetto were subjected to forced labor. On September 9, 1942, the German gendarmerie and the Ukrainian police liquidated the ghetto. More than 1,500 Jews were killed in a grave.

A local newspaper is published here since 1945.

In January 1989 the population was 4118 people.

Until 26 January 2024, Lokachi was designated urban-type settlement. On this day, a new law entered into force which abolished this status, and Lokachi became a rural settlement.
