= Liubeshiv =

Rural locality in Volyn Oblast, Ukraine

- Rural settlement
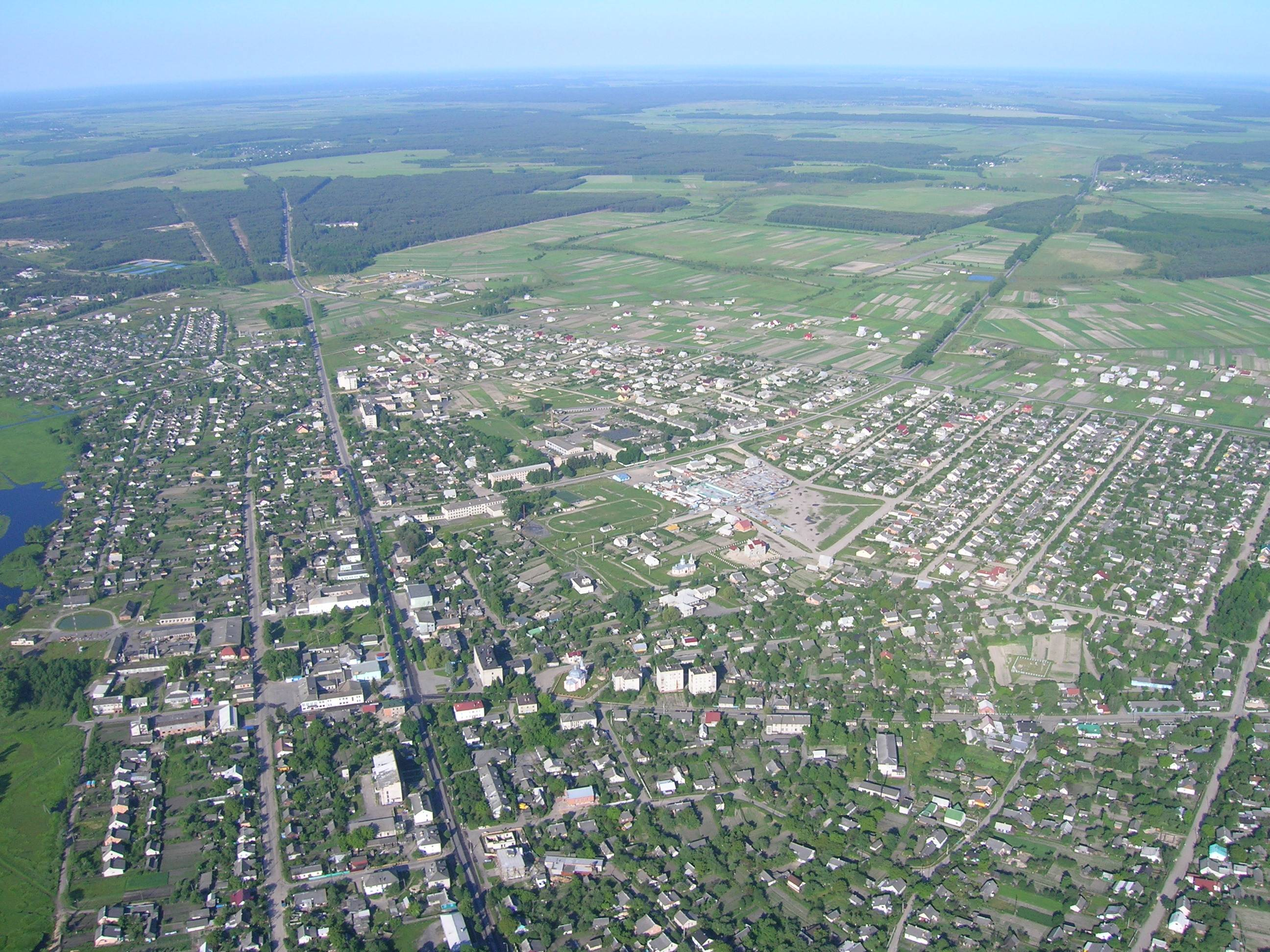

- Location within Volyn Oblast Location within Ukraine
- Coordinates: 51°46′N 25°30′E
- Country: Ukraine
- Oblast: Volyn Oblast
- Raion: Kamin-Kashyrskyi Raion
- Hromada: Liubeshiv settlement hromada
- First mentioned: 1484

Area
  - Total: 339 km^{2} (131 sq mi)

Population (2022)
  - Total: 5,702
  - Density: 16.8/km^{2} (43.6/sq mi)
- Time zone: UTC+2 (EET)
  - Summer (DST): UTC+3 (EEST)

Liubeshiv (Ukrainian: Любешів; Polish: Lubieszów; Belarusian: Любяшоў, romanized: Lubiašoŭ; Yiddish: ליבישויוו) is a rural settlement in Kamin-Kashyrskyi Raion, Volyn Oblast, western Ukraine. It is located in the historic region of Polesia. It is the administrative seat of Liubeshiv settlement hromada. Population: 5,702 (2022 estimate).

== History ==
Historical affiliations

Grand Duchy of Lithuania 1484–1569
Polish–Lithuanian Commonwealth 1569–1795
Russian Empire 1795–1917
Ukrainian People's Republic 1917-1918, 1918-1919
Second Polish Republic 1919–1945
Soviet Union 1939–1941 (occupation)
Nazi Germany 1941–1944 (occupation)
Soviet Union 1944–1945 (occupation)
Soviet Union 1945–1991
Ukraine 1991–present

Lubieszów was first mentioned in 1484. It was a private town of Grand Duchy of Lithuania, later part of Polish–Lithuanian Commonwealth. After the Partitions of Poland it was annexed by Russia.

In 1684 a monastery was established in Liubeshiv by the Catholic order of Piarists, and in 1693 a collegium was founded by the order's monks in the town. The foundation was supported by the local landowners from Dolski family, with Anna Dolska, the widow of the town's former owner, donating 30,000 złotys on the construction of the monastery and another thousand for the purchase of books for the local library. Some sources of the time mentioned Liubeshiv as "New Dolsk".

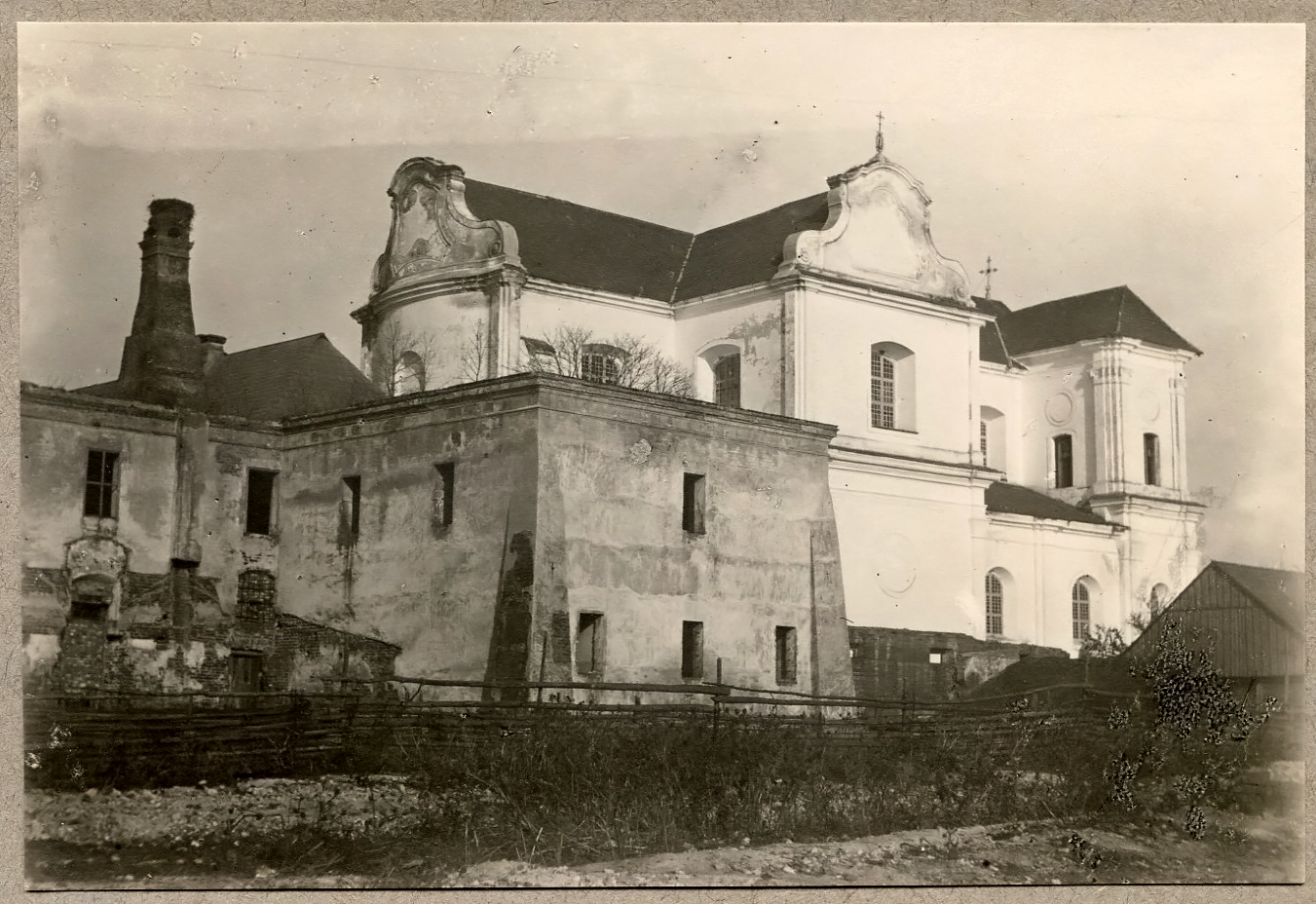
View of the church and monastery in Liubeshiv before WW1

During the late 1690s the settlement came into ownership of the Wisniowiecki family, who donated 20,000 złotys for the education of local youths. During the 18th century the collegium in Liubeshiv achieved great authority, and also housed a pharmacy serving local inhabitants. In 1730 a botanical garden was created, with some of its trees surviving to our time. Among students of Liubeshiv collegium was Polish statesman and revolutionary Tadeusz Kosciuszko, who also fought in the American War of Independence. Teaching positions in the collegium were held representatives of different nations, such as Poles, Lithuanians and Ukrainians. Rafał Józef Czerwiakowski, known as the "father of Polish surgery", started his medical practice in Liubeshiv and taught at the collegium. Among notable alumni of the establishment were natural scientist and Vilnius University professor Stanisław Bonifacy Jundziłł, philosopher Kazimierz Narbutt, jurist and historian Maciej Dogiel.

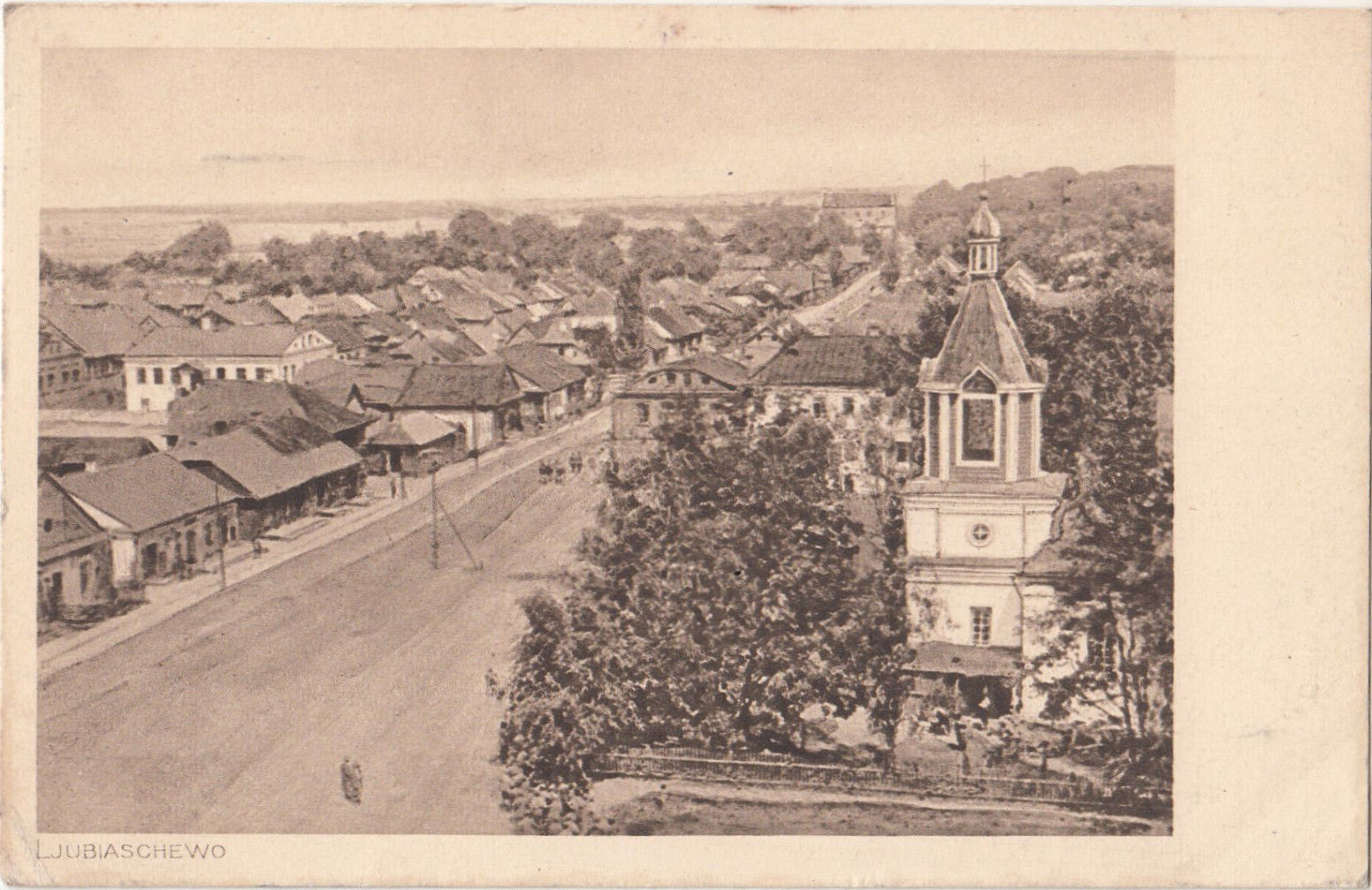
Liubeshiv in 1915

Between 1745 and 1762 the Piarist church was constructed in Liubeshiv. Adorned with numerous frescoes depicting the scene of Ascension of Christ and the Mother of God, it was consecrated in 1786. The collegium in Liubeshiv was closed down by Russian authorities in 1852. During the battles of First World War in July 1916 the monastery and church buildings were seriously damaged. In 1926 the complex was transferred to Capucin monks, who attempted to revive the educational establishment, which functioned until 1939. After the Second World War the monastery building was repurposed as a school and stands to this day. In 1969 Soviet authorities demolished the church and destroyed its frescoes.

On 9 November 1943, 300 Poles were murdered by the Ukrainians as part of the genocide of Poles in Volhynia. A 2013 monument on the local Polish cemetery commemorates the victims

Until 26 January 2024, Liubeshiv was designated urban-type settlement. On this day, a new law entered into force which abolished this status, and Liubeshiv became a rural settlement.

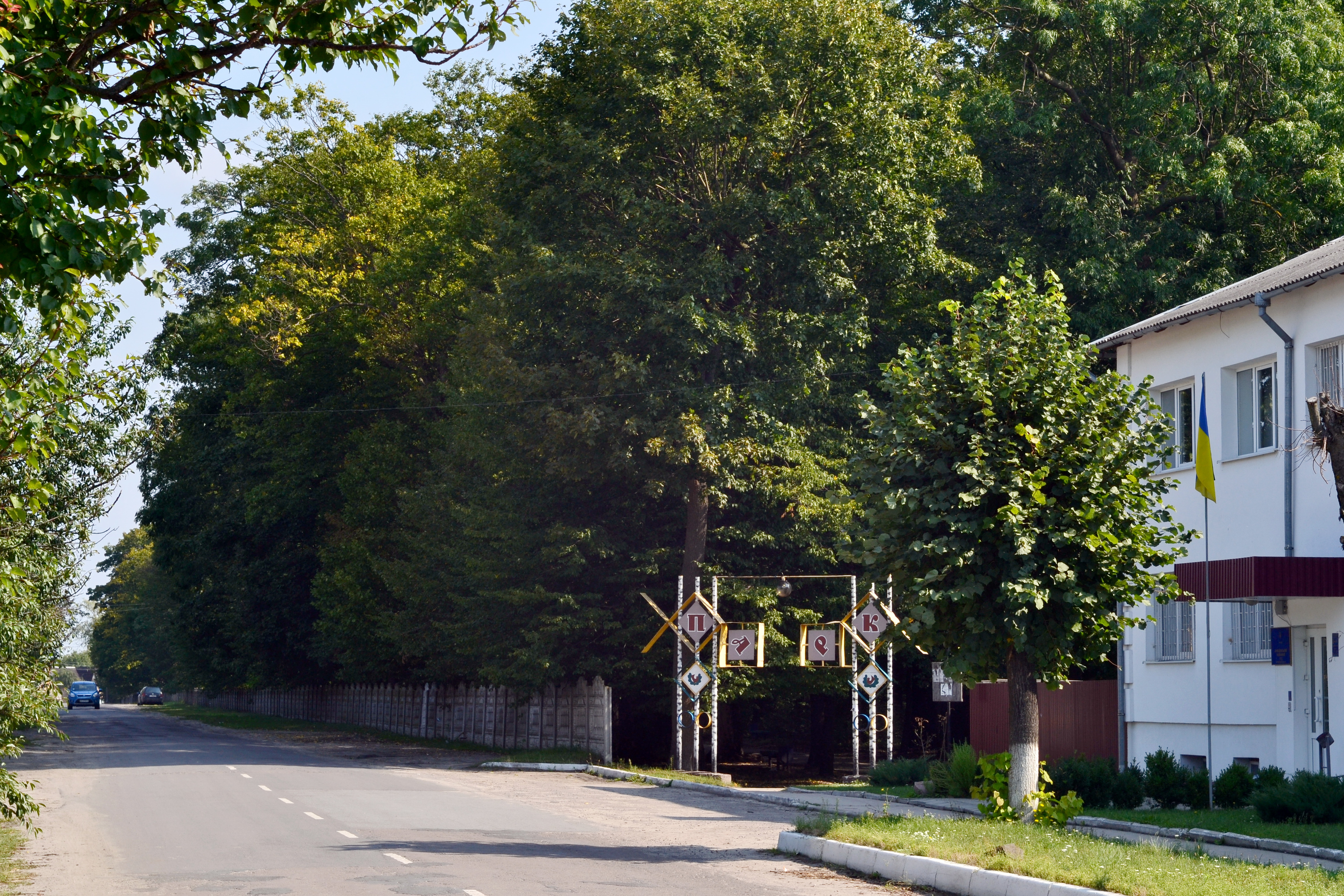
Modern view of the botanical garden in Liubeshiv

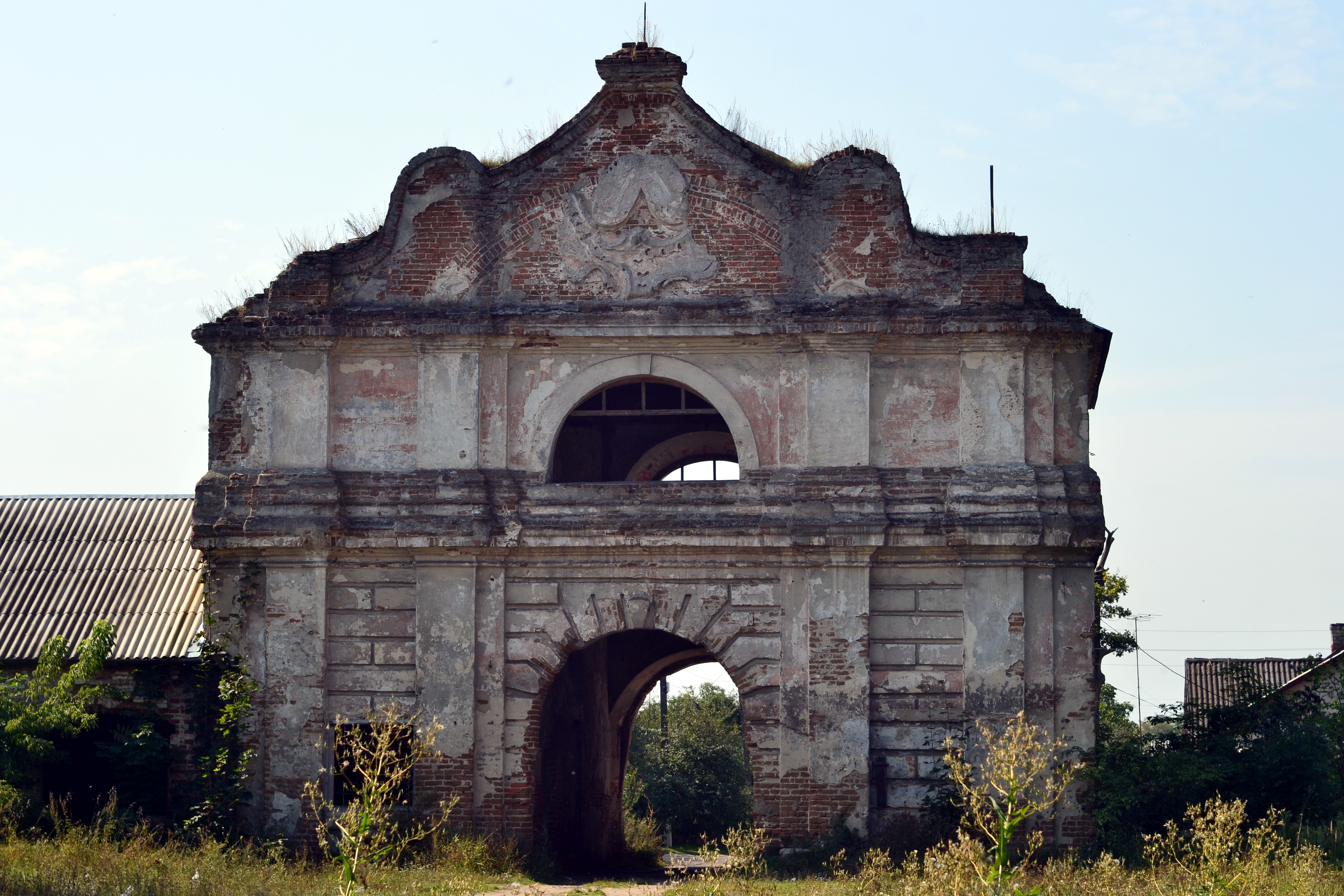
Entrance gates of the manor in Liubeshiv

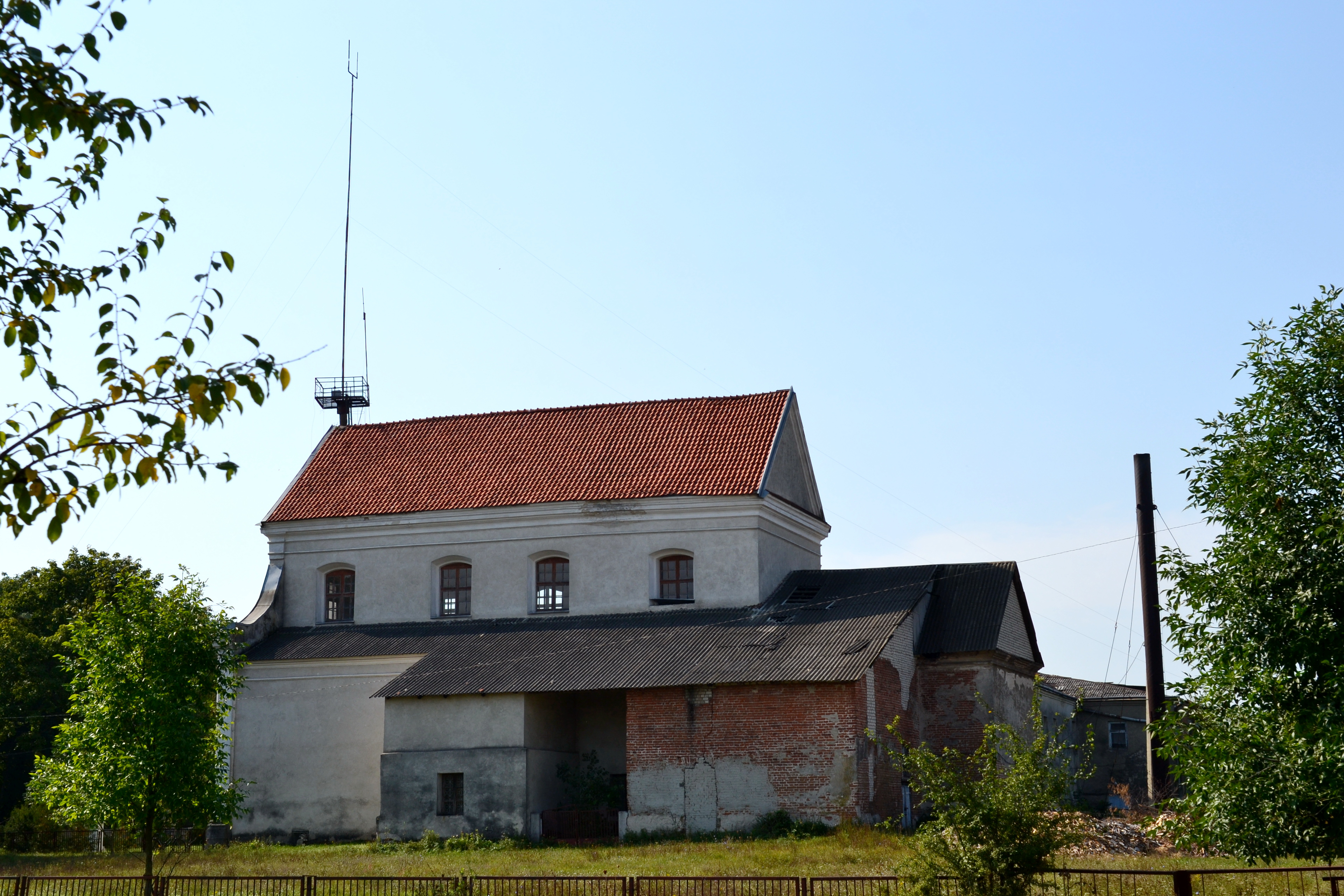
Historic monastery building

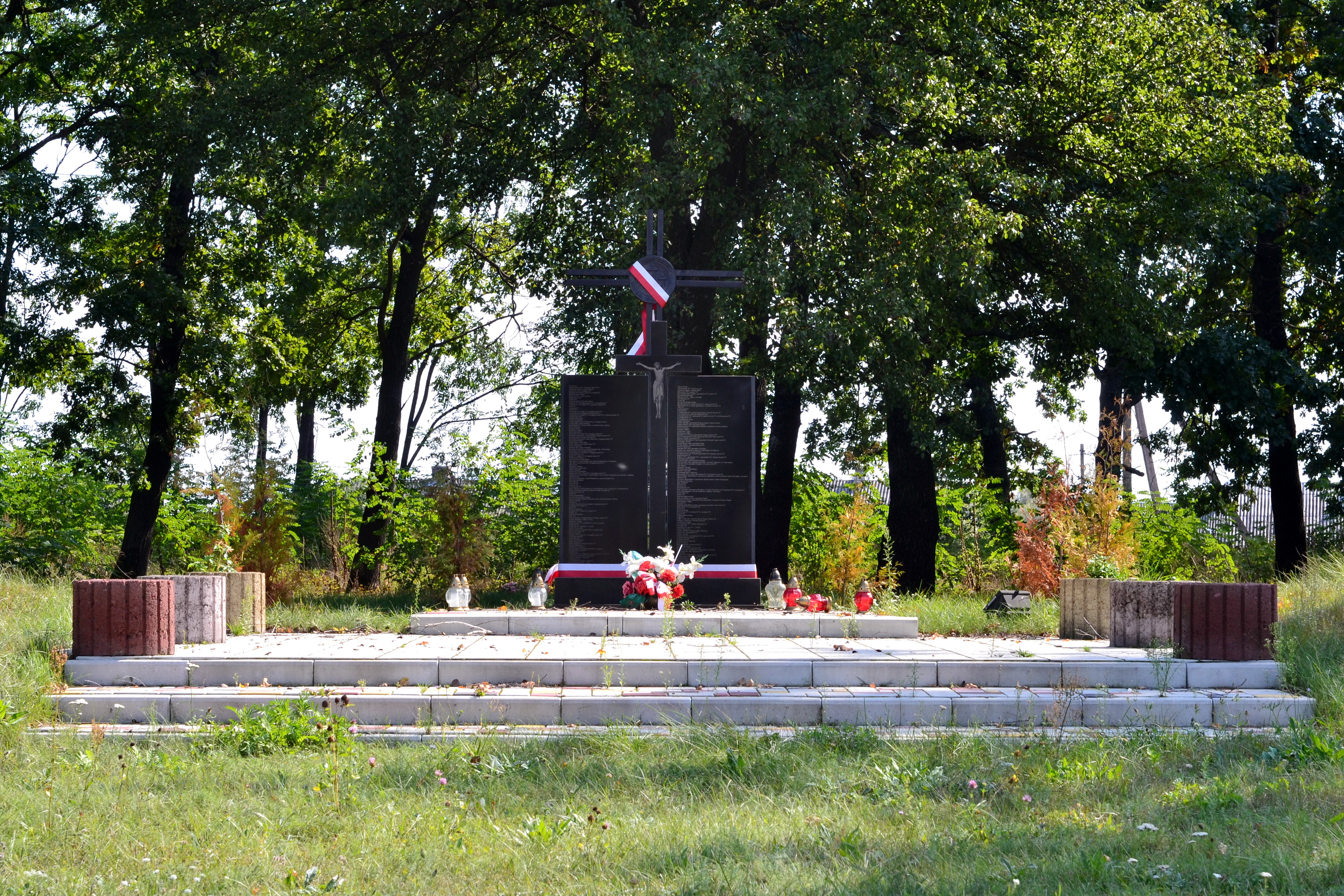
Monument commemorating the victims of the 1943 massacre

== Notable people ==
- Taras Mykhalyk, retired Ukrainian footballer.
