= Senkevychivka =

Rural locality in Volyn Oblast, Ukraine

Senkevychivka Сенкевичівка
- Rural settlement
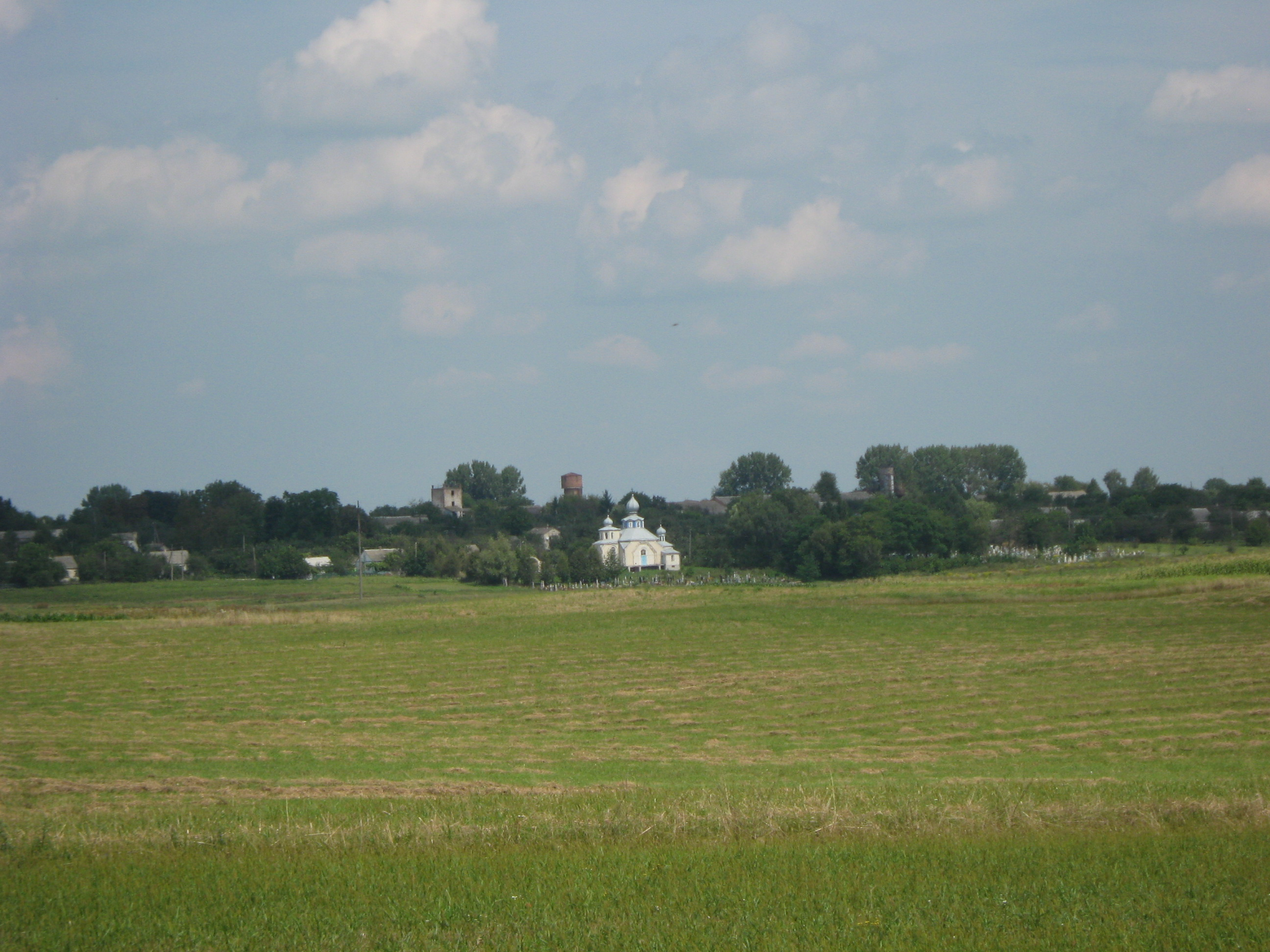
- View towards the settlement

- Location in Volyn Oblast Location in Ukraine
- Coordinates: 50°31′33″N 25°02′29″E
- Country: Ukraine
- Oblast: Volyn Oblast
- Raion: Lutsk Raion
- Hromada: Horodyshche rural hromada

Population (2022)
  - Total: 1,208
- Time zone: UTC+2 (EET)
  - Summer (DST): UTC+3 (EEST)

Senkevychivka (Ukrainian: Сенкевичівка; Polish: Sienkiewiczówka) is a rural settlement in Lutsk Raion, Volyn Oblast, western Ukraine. It is located in the south of the oblast, about 30 kilometres (19 mi) southwest of the city of Lutsk. Population: 1,208 (2022 estimate).

== History ==
Until 26 January 2024, Senkevychivka was designated urban-type settlement. On this day, a new law entered into force which abolished this status, and Senkevychivka became a rural settlement.

== Economy ==
=== Transportation ===
Senkevychivka railway station is on the railway connecting Lutsk and Lviv. There is infrequent passenger traffic.

The settlement has access to Highway H17 connecting Lutsk and Lviv.
