= Ratne =

Rural locality in Volyn Oblast, Ukraine

Ratne Ратне
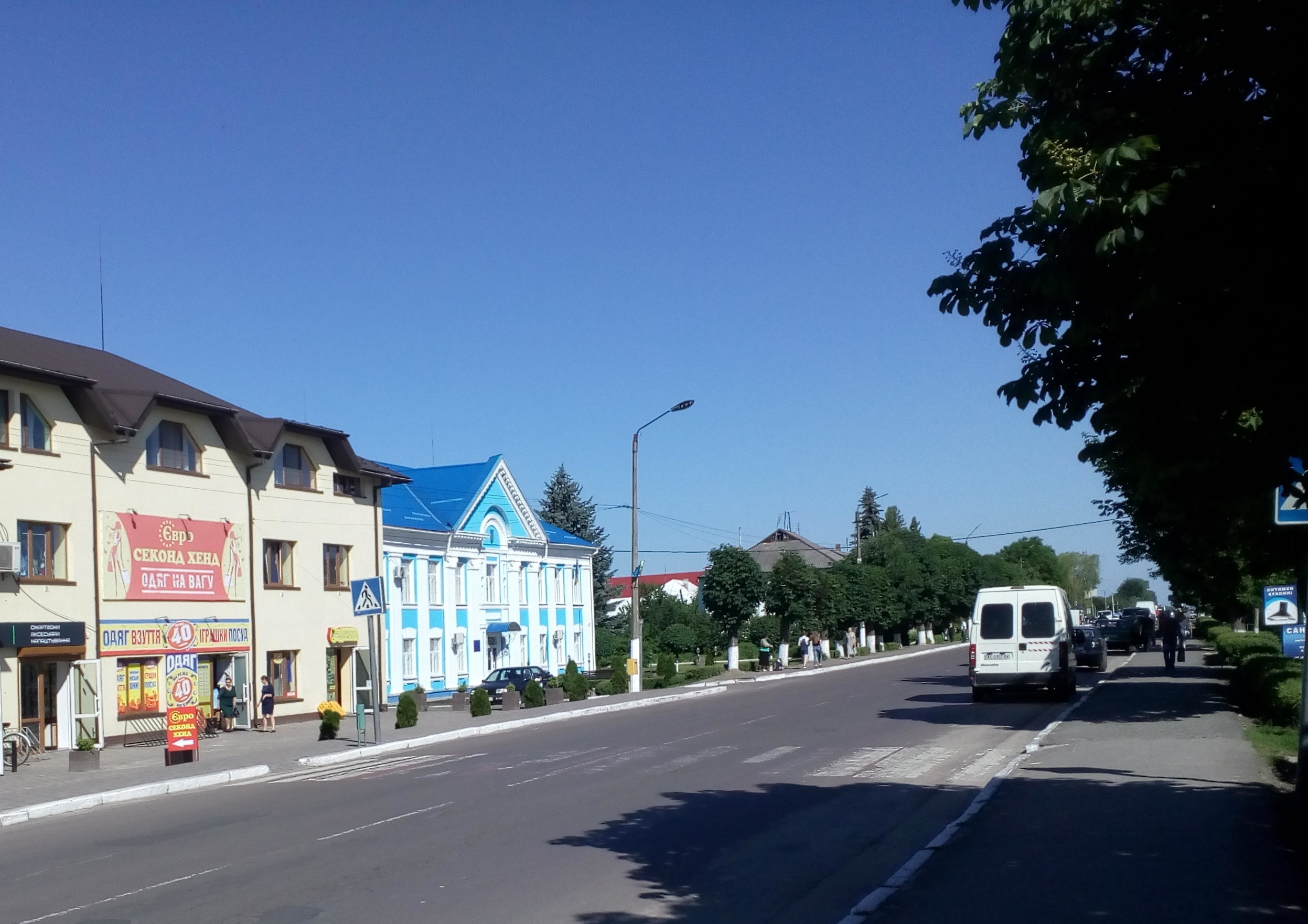
- Downtown Ratne
- Interactive map of Ratne
- Location within Volyn Oblast Location within Ukraine
- Coordinates: 51.6500°N 24.5333°E
- Country: Ukraine
- Oblast: Volyn Oblast
- Raion: Kovel Raion
- Hromada: Ratne settlement hromada
- Founded: 13th Century
- Rural council: Ratne Rural Council

Government
  - Mayor: Vitaliy Biryuk (Fatherland)

Area
  - Total: 7.46 km^{2} (2.88 sq mi)

Population (2022)
  - Total: 9,577
  - Estimate (2024): ▼8,870
  - Density: 1,280/km^{2} (3,320/sq mi)
- Postal code: 44100
- Area code: +380 3366

Ratne (Ukrainian: Ратне; Polish: Ratno; Yiddish: ראטנא, romanized: Ratno) is a rural settlement in Volyn Oblast, western Ukraine. It is located in the historic region of Volhynia. Population: 9,577 (2022 estimate).

== History ==
Ratne is mentioned in old Ruthenian documents at the end of 12th - beginning of 13th centuries. It served as a border town where Great Prince kept his garrison (rat). The town was devastated during the Mongol invasion. In the 13th century the town housed the Ratne monastery whose hegumen was Peter of Moscow. After the Galicia-Volhynia Wars, in 14th century the territory around Ratne was annexed by the Kingdom of Poland.

Ratne was granted Magdeburg city rights by Polish King Władysław III in the 15th century. From 1366 until the partitions of Poland it was part of the Chełm Land. It was a royal city of the Crown of the Kingdom of Poland. From 1921 to 1939 it was part of the Volhynian Voivodeship of Poland.

The city had a significant Jewish population before World War II. During the war, the Jewish community suffered many attacks. The biggest massacre was on August 25, 1942. Some 1,300 persons were taken to the quarry outside the town and there fire was opened on them. A few dozen artisans remained in the town but by March 1943 these had been gradually killed off.

Of those who had fled some 30 families gathered in the forest. They succeeded in obtaining a few arms and they set up a sort of camp. During the next three months nearly all of them were slaughtered. A handful from Ratne and the surrounding villages joined various Soviet partisan units.

Until 26 January 2024, Ratne was designated urban-type settlement. On this day, a new law entered into force which abolished this status, and Ratne became a rural settlement.

== Notable people ==
- Peter of Moscow (c.1260-1326) - Eastern Orthodox Metropolitan of Kyiv

== Gallery ==
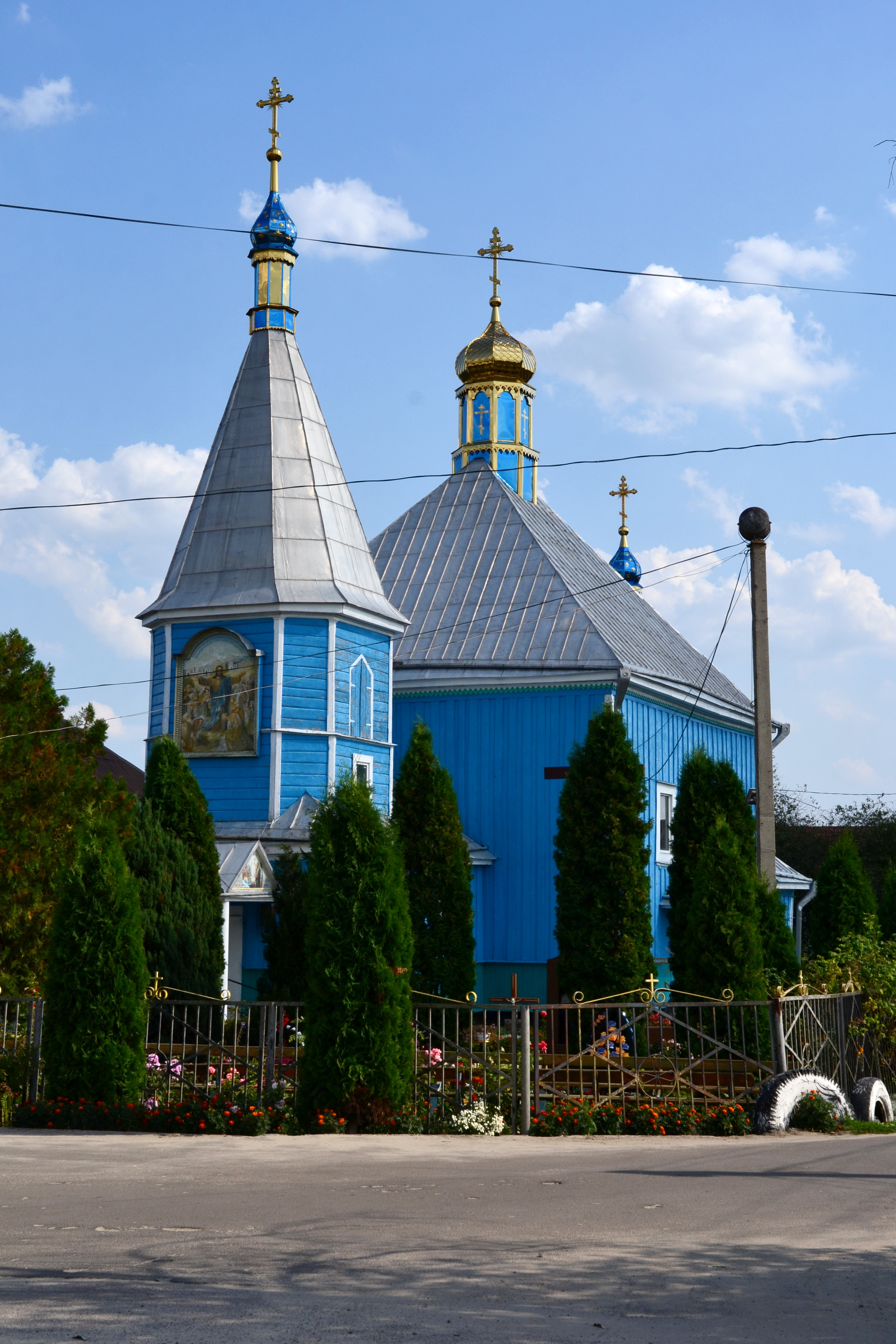
Church of Nativity of the Virgin

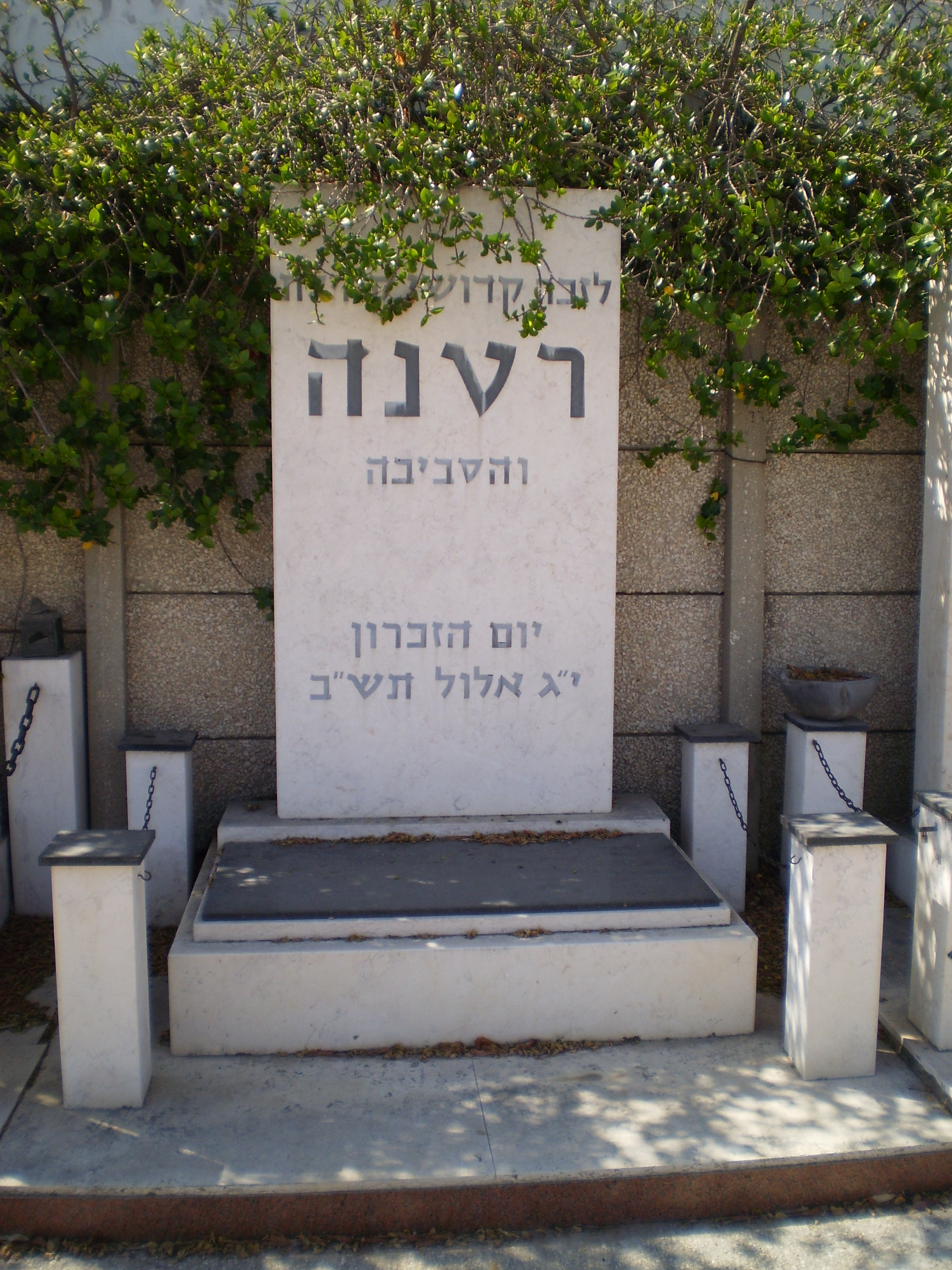
Ratne holocaust memorial

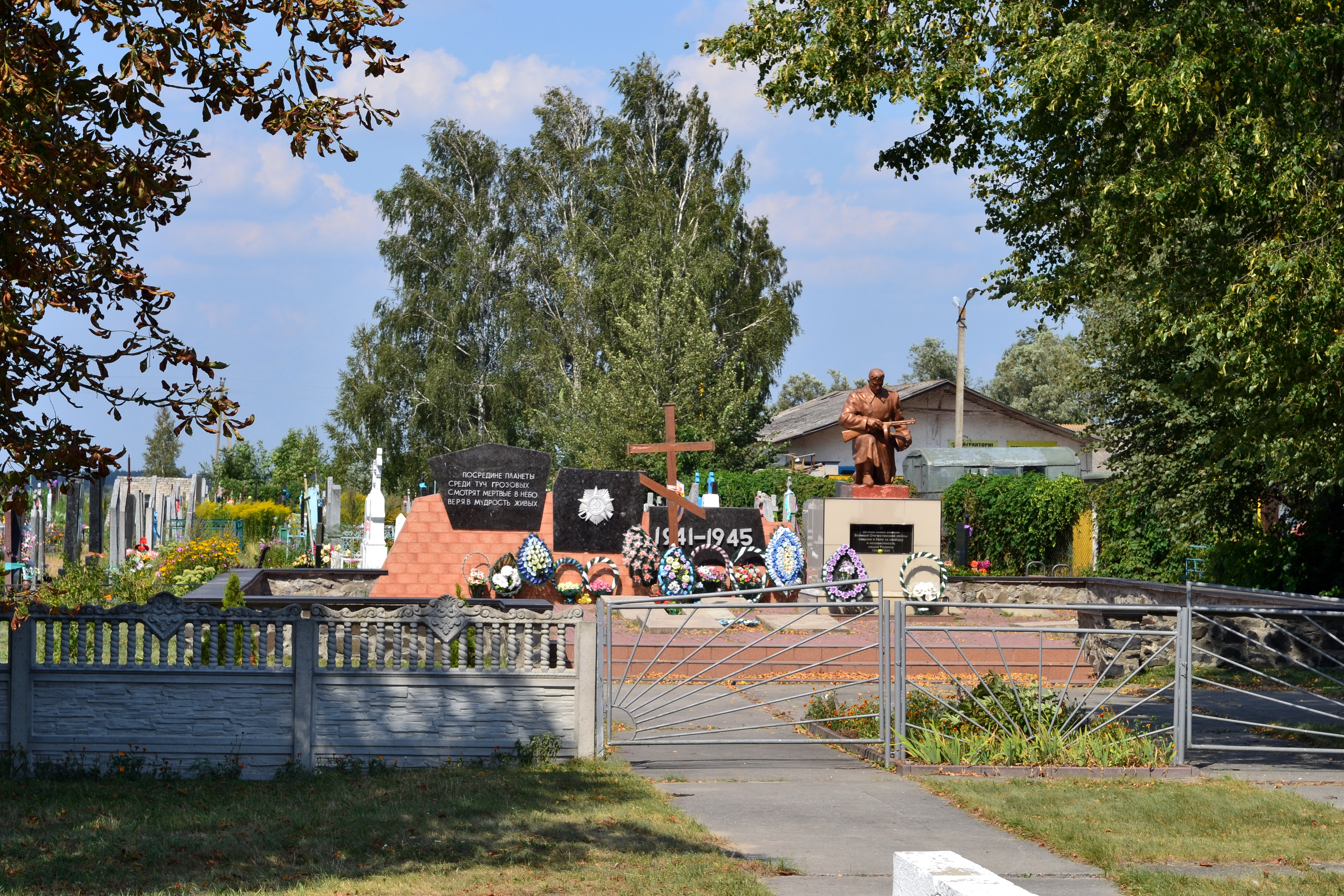
Graves of World War II soldiers in Ratne
