= Kovel Raion =

Subdivision of Volyn Oblast, Ukraine

Kovel Raion Ковельський район
- Raion
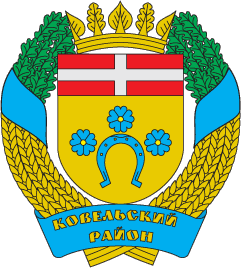
- Flag Coat of arms

- Interactive map of Kovel Raion
- Coordinates: 51°09′00″N 24°48′00″E
- Country: Ukraine
- Oblast: Volyn Oblast
- Established: 1939
- Admin. center: Kovel
- Subdivisions: 23 hromadas

Area
  - Total: 7,647.9 km^{2} (2,952.9 sq mi)

Population (2022)
  - Total: 266,304
  - Density: 34.821/km^{2} (90.185/sq mi)
- Time zone: UTC+02:00 (EET)
  - Summer (DST): UTC+03:00 (EEST)
- Area code: 380-3352
- Website: http://www.koveladm.gov.ua/ Kovelskyi Raion

Kovel Raion (Ukrainian: Ковельський район) is a raion (district) in Volyn Oblast in western Ukraine. Its administrative center is Kovel. Population: 265,304 (2022 estimate).

On 18 July 2020, as part of the administrative reform of Ukraine, the number of raions of Volyn Oblast was reduced to four, and the area of Kovel Raion was significantly expanded.

The district is divided into 23 territorial communities.

The January 2020 estimate of the raion population was 40,395 (2020 est.).

== Geographic characteristics ==
Kovelsky district is located on the Polesian Lowland in Volyn Polissya. The highest point of the district is 223 m located on the Volyn Range. The relief of the district is flat, partly lowland, covered with pine and oak forests.

Kovelsky district has reserves of silt, sapropel, peat.

The climate of the region is moderately continental: winter is mild, with unstable frosts; summer is warm, not hot. Most often, comfortable weather is observed in the summer months. The formation of stable snow cover is noted in the second decade of December. The average height of the snow cover can reach 10 cm.

The rivers Turia, Vyzhivka and Stokhid (Prypiat basin) flow through the district. There are many lakes in the district, the most famous are Shatsky Lakes.

The soils are mainly sod-podzolic, peat bogs, meadows and swampy.

The forest cover of the district is 25%, the area of forests is 73.7 thousand hectares. The structure of the forests is dominated by coniferous species of trees. Logging is developed in the region.

Kovel forests are rich in mushrooms and berries. Among the mushrooms, chanterelles, tricholoma equestre, suillus luteus, armillaria mellea, russula, and porcini mushrooms predominate. The most common berries are blueberries, raspberries, and blackberries.

Among the animals of the forests of the region, the most typical are moose, roe deer, wild boar, badger, fox, marten, otter, wolf, hare - brown hare, muskrat, and ferret. Among the birds, there are black grouse, capercaillie, and hazel grouse. Migratory routes of birds run through the territory of the region. Carp, crucian carp, pike, bream, and catfish are common in the rivers and lakes of the region.

Among the vegetation of the region listed in the Red Book of Ukraine: red bulatka and English sundew, May zozulk and bukovets.

== Transport ==
A number of important transport corridors pass through the district, including the European highways E85 and E373, the railway runs towards Chełm, Lviv and Brest.

== Tourism ==
Tourist attractions of the district:

- Lesia Ukrainka Museum, in the village of Kolodyazhne
- The Church of St. Dmitry, built in 1567, is a monument of wooden architecture of Volyn.
- Shatsk National Nature Park
- Landscape reserve "Nechymne" in the village of Skulyn,Skulyn with an area of 40 hectares.

== Notable people ==
- Dmitry Abramovich (1873—1955), Soviet historian and writer

== See also ==
- Administrative divisions of Volyn Oblast
- Nature reserves of the district (in Ukrainian)

== Bibliography ==
- Національний атлас України/НАН України, Інститут географії, Державна служба геодезії, картографії та кадастру; голов. ред. Л. Г. Руденко; голова ред. кол.Б.Є. Патон. — К.: ДНВП «Картографія», 2007. — 435 с. — 5 тис.прим. — ISBN 978-966-475-067-4.
