= List of cities in Volyn Oblast =

Location of cities in Volyn Oblast

There are 12 populated places in Volyn Oblast, Ukraine, that have been officially granted city status (Ukrainian: місто, romanized: misto) by the Verkhovna Rada, the country's parliament. Settlements with more than 10,000 people are eligible for city status, although the status is typically also granted to settlements of historical or regional importance. As of 5 December 2001, the date of the first and only official census in the country since independence, (Note: As of 11 July 2023) the most populous city in the oblast was the regional capital, Lutsk, with a population of 208,816 people, while the least populous city was Berestechko, with 1,904 people.

From independence in 1991 to 2020, four cities in the oblast were designated as cities of regional significance (municipalities), which had self-government under city councils, while the oblast's remaining seven cities were located amongst sixteen raions (districts) as cities of district significance, which are subordinated to the governments of the raions. On 18 July 2020, an administrative reform abolished and merged the oblast's raions and cities of regional significance into four new, expanded raions. The four raions that make up the oblast are Kamin-Kashyrskyi, Kovel, Lutsk, and Volodymyr.

== List of cities ==
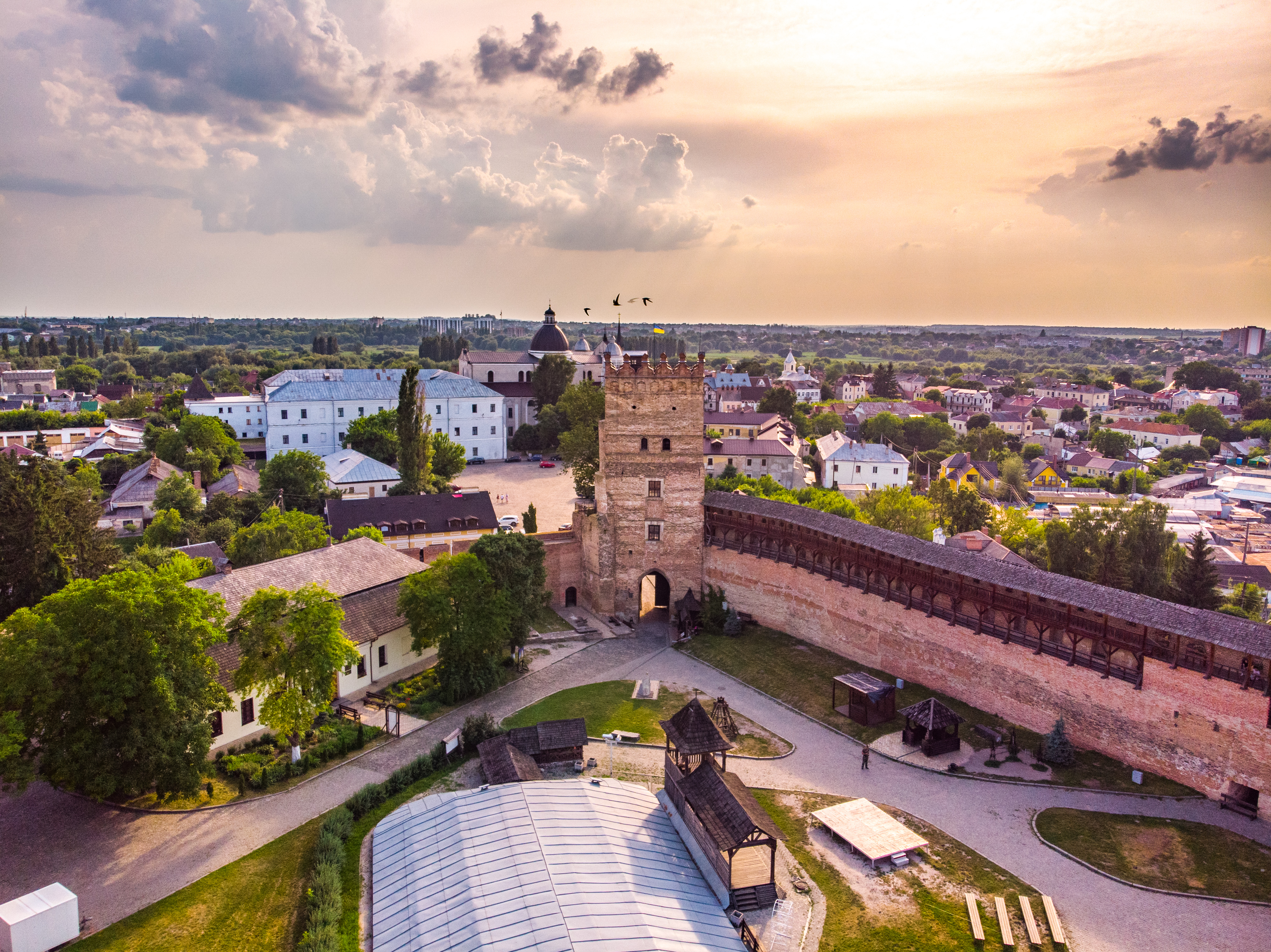
Lutsk, capital and most populous city in Volyn Oblast

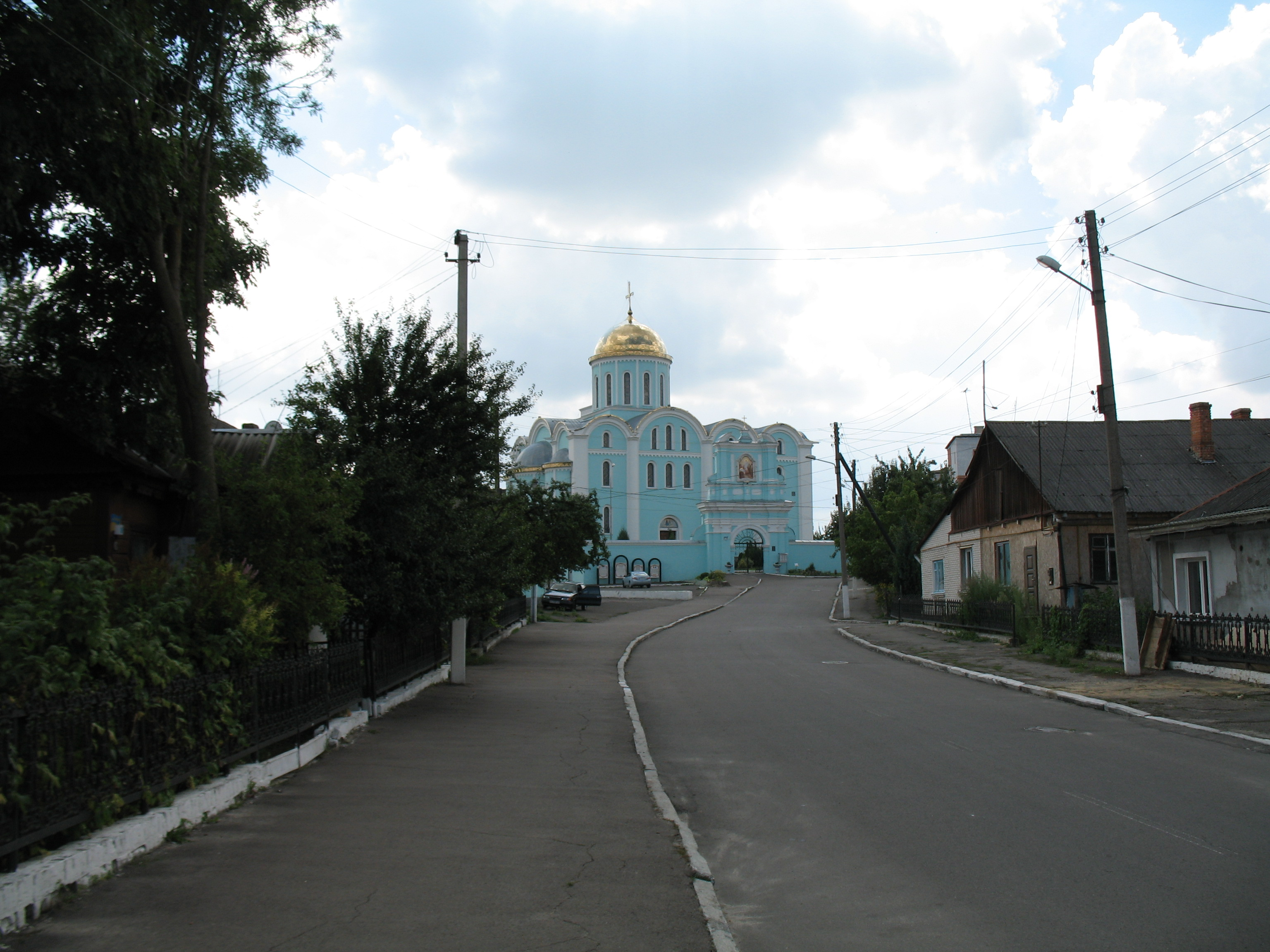
Volodymyr, the medieval capital of Volhynia

Cities in Volyn Oblast
Name	Name (in Ukrainian) (Note: Links to the Ukrainian Wikipedia articles for each city)	Raion (district)	Population (2022 estimates)	Population (2001 census)	Population change
Berestechko	Берестечко	Lutsk	1,630	1,904	−14.39%
Horokhiv	Горохів	Lutsk	8,925	9,015	−1.00%
Kamin-Kashyrskyi	Камінь-Каширський	Kamin-Kashyrskyi	12,477	10,818	+15.34%
Kivertsi	Ківерці	Lutsk	13,798	16,678	−17.27%
Kovel	Ковель	Kovel	67,575	66,401	+1.77%
Liuboml	Любомль	Kovel	10,295	10,395	−0.96%
Lutsk	Луцьк	Lutsk	215,986	208,816	+3.43%
Novovolynsk	Нововолинськ	Volodymyr	49,772	53,838	−7.55%
Olyka	Олика	Lutsk	3,032	2,865	+5.83%
Rozhyshche	Рожище	Lutsk	12,483	13,636	−8.46%
Ustyluh	Устилуг	Volodymyr	2,060	2,283	−9.77%
Volodymyr	Володимир	Volodymyr	37,910	38,256	−0.90%

== See also ==
- List of cities in Ukraine
