= Kolky, Volyn Oblast =

Rural locality in Volyn Oblast, Ukraine

Kolky
- Rural settlement
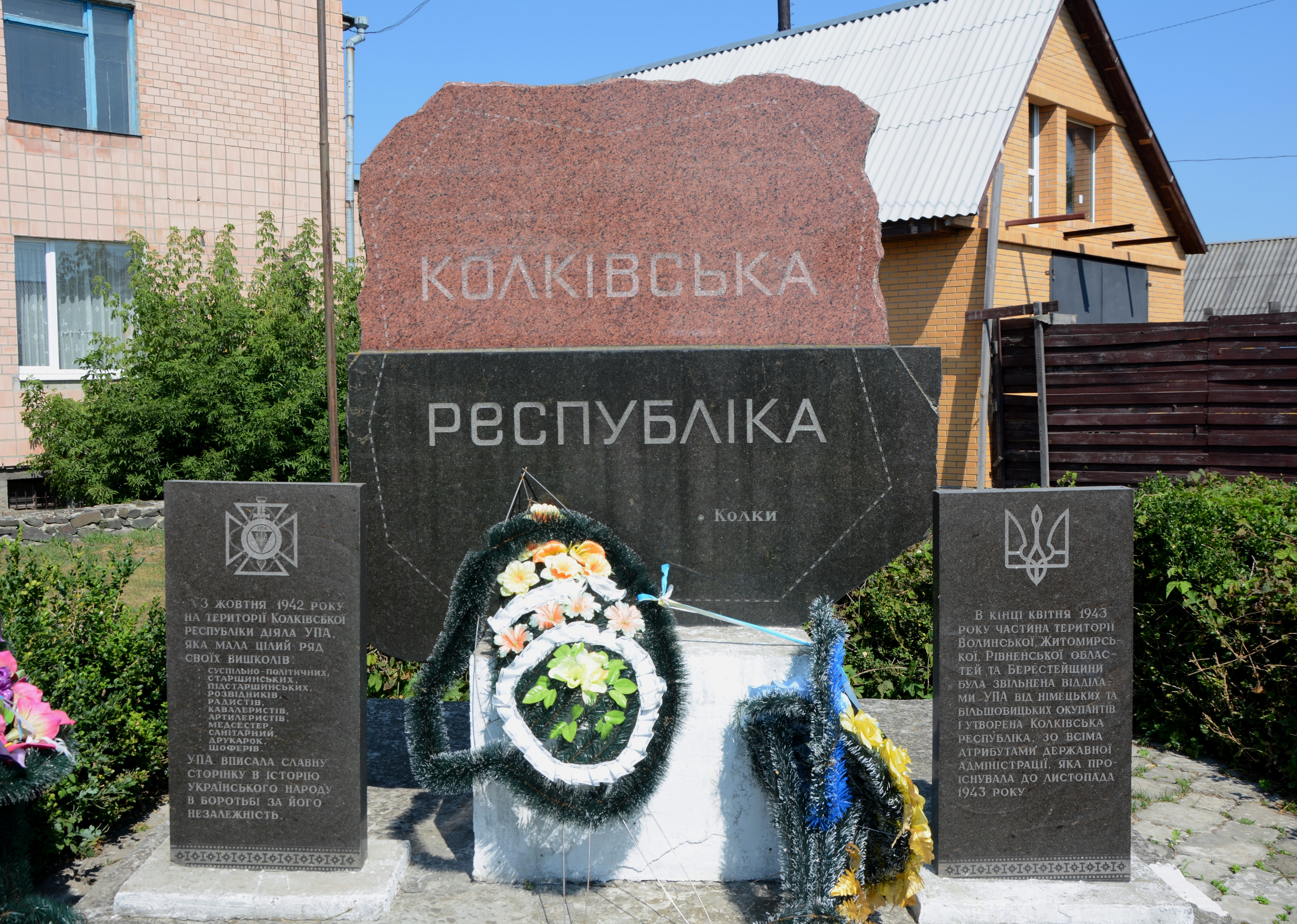

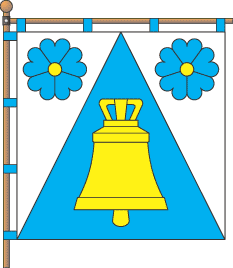
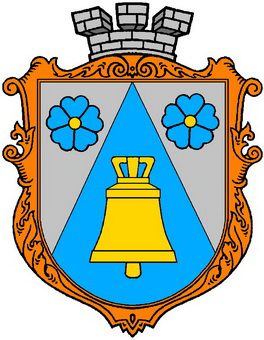
- Flag Coat of arms

- Location within Volyn Oblast Location within Ukraine
- Coordinates: 51°06′N 25°41′E
- Country: Ukraine
- Oblast: Volyn Oblast
- Raion: Lutsk Raion
- Hromada: Kolky settlement hromada
- First mentioned: 1545

Population (2022)
  - Total: 3,974
- Time zone: UTC+2 (EET)
  - Summer (DST): UTC+3 (EEST)

Kolky (Ukrainian: Колки), also Kolki (Yiddish: קאָלקי; Polish: Kołki; Russian: Колки; Hungarian: Kolke), is a rural settlement in Lutsk Raion, Volyn Oblast, western Ukraine. It is located in the historic region of Volhynia. Kolky has a population of 3,974 (2022 estimate).

Kolky is located on the confluence of the Styr and Rudka rivers, 51 kilometres north-east of Lutsk.

== History ==
Historical affiliations

Grand Duchy of Lithuania 1545–1569
Polish–Lithuanian Commonwealth 1569–1795
Russian Empire 1795–1917
Ukrainian People's Republic 1917-1918, 1918-1919
Second Polish Republic 1919–1945
Soviet Union 1939–1941 (occupation)
Nazi Germany 1941–1943 (occupation)
Kolky Republic 1943
Soviet Union 1944–1945 (occupation)
Soviet Union 1945–1991
Ukraine 1991–present

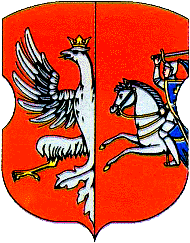
Pre-war Polish coat of arms of Kołki

First mentionof Kolky comes from 1545. In 1915 the village was a site of fierce battles between Russian and Austro-German armies. It received urban-type settlement status in 1940.

Before World War II, around a third of the total population (724 members in 1921, 860 in 1937) was Jewish. The German army occupied the city at the end of 1941. 50 Jews were murdered by the Ukrainian police during the summer of 1941. In October 1941, Jews were forced to live in a ghetto. In July 1942, the Jewish population was massacred by an Einsatzgruppen of Germans, members of Sicherheitsdienst and Gendarmerie and by Ukrainians, members of the local police.

Between 1943-1945 Kolky was a stationing point of the Northern Group of Ukrainian Insurgent Army, which fought against Germans and Soviet partisans. The Kolky Republic was a wartime state organized in Kolky by Ukrainian partisans during the Second World War. Lasting from May to November 1943, the republic had its own currency, the Bofon, and supported public services, including a number of military hospitals. The Ukrainian Insurgent Army, which had liberated the town from German troops, defended the local population from Russian and German occupiers for more than six months. After several unsuccessful attempts to capture the town, the occupiers managed to do so by joint efforts. On 3–4 November, the Soviet army launched an offensive against the town from the Tsuman forests. On 4 November, five planes arrived and bombed the settlement to the ground. More than five hundred residents were killed. The Polish Armia Krajowa also assisted the German and Soviet forces in this massacre.

The heraldry and the gonfalon are adopted in 1997. The bell is a symbol of the defensive role of the city throughout history. The linaceae is a local resource.

Until 26 January 2024, Kolky was designated urban-type settlement. On this day, a new law entered into force which abolished this status, and Kolky became a rural settlement.

== Notable people ==
- Tadeusz Piotrowski, Polish mountaineer, was born in Kolki
- Family of Esther Safran Foer, writer and mother of Jonathan Safran Foer

== See also ==
- Kolky Republic
