= Dubyshche =

Rural locality in Volyn Oblast, Ukraine

Dubyshche Дубище
- Rural settlement
- Location in Volyn Oblast Location in Ukraine
- Coordinates: 50°55′40″N 25°18′29″E
- Country: Ukraine
- Oblast: Volyn Oblast
- Raion: Lutsk Raion
- Hromada: Rozhyshche urban hromada

Population (2022)
  - Total: 1,939
- Time zone: UTC+2 (EET)
  - Summer (DST): UTC+3 (EEST)

Dubyshche (Ukrainian: Дубище; Polish: Dubiszcze) is a rural settlement in Lutsk Raion, Volyn Oblast, western Ukraine. It is located on the right bank of the Styr, a tributary of the Pripyat, in the drainage basin of the Dnieper. Population: 1,939 (2022 estimate).

== History ==
Until 26 January 2024, Dubyshche was designated urban-type settlement. On this day, a new law entered into force which abolished this status, and Dubyshche became a rural settlement.

== Economy ==
=== Transportation ===
The closest railway station is in Rozhyshche, about 3 kilometres (1.9 mi) southwest of the settlement, on a railway connecting Rivne and Kovel. There is intensive passenger traffic.

The settlement has access, via Rozhyshche, to Highway M19 connecting Chernivtsi via Ternopil and Lutsk with Kovel.
