= Kivertsi urban hromada =

Kivertsi urban hromada Ківерцівська міська громада
- Hromada
- Interactive map of Kivertsi urban hromada
- Country: Ukraine
- Oblast: Volyn
- Raion: Lutsk
- Admin. center: Kivertsi

Area
  - Total: 186.8 km^{2} (72.1 sq mi)

Population (2018)
  - Total: 17,745
  - Density: 94.99/km^{2} (246.0/sq mi)
- CATOTTG code: UA07080110000043895
- Settlements: 24
- Cities: 1
- Villages: 23

Kivertsi urban territorial hromada (Ukrainian: Ківерцівська міська територіальна громада) is one of the hromadas of Ukraine, located in Lutsk Raion in Volyn Oblast. Its administrative centre is the city of Kivertsi. Before the 2020 reform, it was part of the Kivertsi Raion.

The hromada has an area of 186.8 km^{2} (72.1 mi^{2}), as well as a population of 17,745 (as of 2018).

Formed on August 8, 2018 by merging the Kivertsi City Council and the Sokyrychi and Susk Village Councils of the Kivertsi Raion.

The prospective plan for the formation of communities in the Volyn region for 2020 provides for the expansion of the hromada by joining the territory of the Trostyanets rural hromada and the Zhuravychi village council of the Kivertsi Raion.

On July 19, 2020, as a result of the administrative-territorial reform and liquidation of the Kivertsi Raion, the hromada became part of the Lutsk Raion.

== Composition ==
In addition to one city (Kivertsi), the hromada contains 23 villages:

- Bodiachiv
- Chovnytsia
- Didovychi
- Domashiv
- Haiove
- Khopniv
- Konopelka
- Lychky
- Muravyshche
- Mykove
- Omelne
- Ostriv
- Ozero
- Slavne
- Slovatychi
- Sokyrychi
- Susk
- Trostianets
- Yaromel
- Zabrody
- Zavitne
- Zhuravychi
- Zvozy

== Geography ==
The Styr, Rudka, Konopelka, Putylivka, and Kormin rivers flow through the hromada.
