= Kivertsi Raion =

Former subdivision of Volyn Oblast, Ukraine

Coordinates: 50°30′N 24°47′E

Kivertsi Raion Ківерцівський район
- Raion
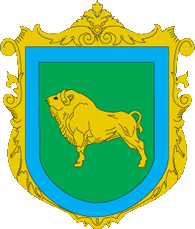
- Flag Coat of arms

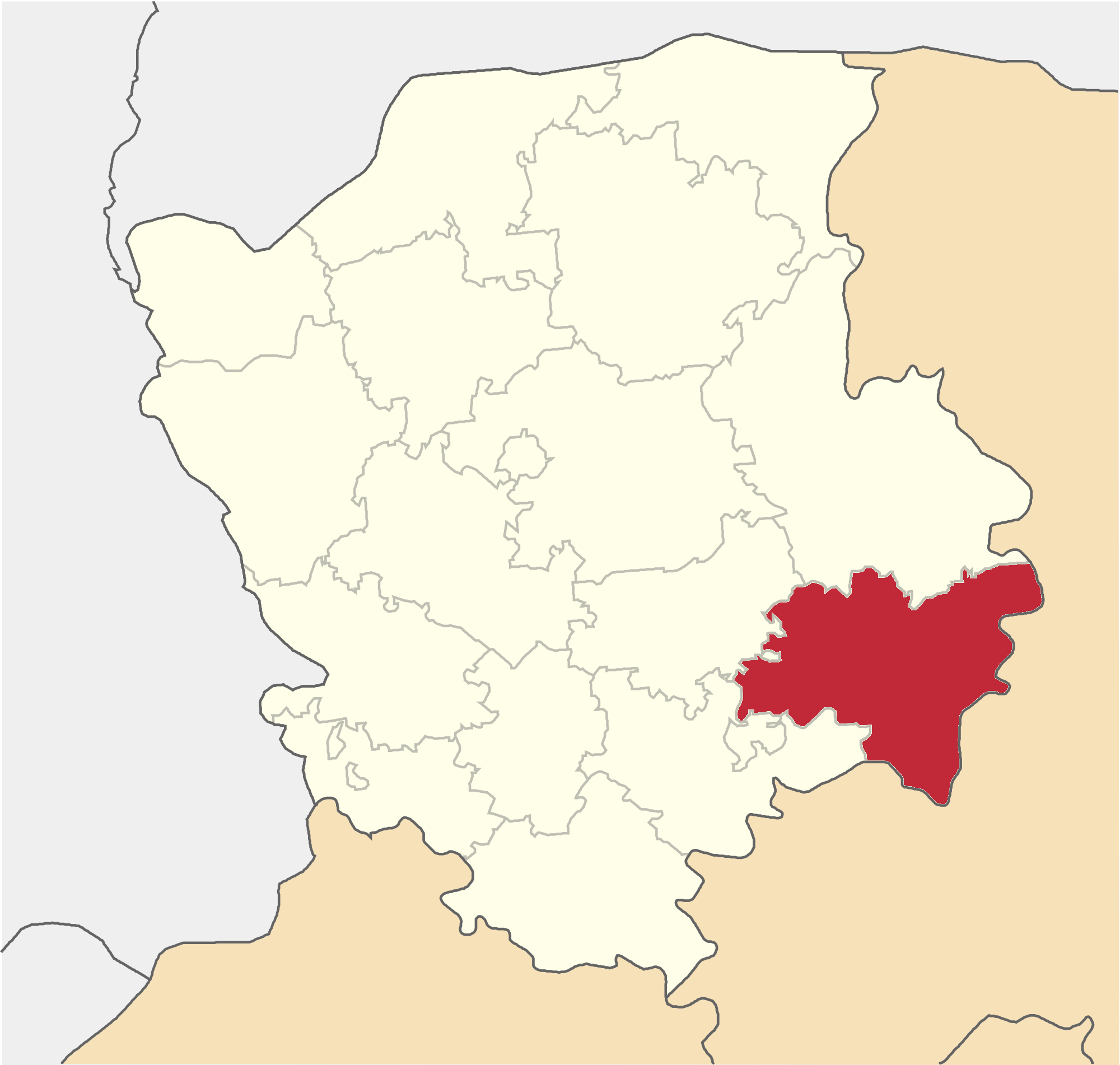
- Country: Ukraine
- Oblast: Volyn Oblast
- Established: 1940
- Disestablished: 18 July 2020
- Admin. center: Kivertsi
- Subdivisions: List: — city councils; — settlement councils; — rural councils; Number of localities: — cities; — urban-type settlements; 72 — villages; — rural settlements

Area
  - Total: 1,414 km^{2} (546 sq mi)

Population (2020)
  - Total: 63,576
  - Density: 44.96/km^{2} (116.5/sq mi)
- Time zone: UTC+02:00 (EET)
  - Summer (DST): UTC+03:00 (EEST)
- Area code: 380-3365
- Website: http://www.kivadm.gov.ua/

Kivertsi Raion (Ukrainian: Ківерцівський район) was a raion in Volyn Oblast in western Ukraine. Its administrative center was the ton of Kivertsi. The raion was abolished and its territory was merged into Lutsk Raion on 18 July 2020 as part of the administrative reform of Ukraine, which reduced the number of raions of Volyn Oblast to four. The last estimate of the raion population was 63,576 (2020 est.)

== See also ==
- Administrative divisions of Volyn Oblast
