= Oleg Klymyuk =

Ballet dancer and ballet master

Oleg Klymyuk (Ukrainian: Олег Климюк; born 26 July 1976 in Kivertsi, near Lutsk, then in the Ukrainian Soviet Socialist Republic) is a Ukrainian-German ballet dancer, ballet teacher and ballet master. He was a member of the Semperoper Ballet in Dresden from 2003 to 2015 and became a first soloist in 2012. A significant part of his artistic career has been connected with the choreography of American choreographer William Forsythe, first as a performer and later through staging, coaching and the transmission of Forsythe's works.

== Early life and training ==
Klymyuk was born in Kivertsi in the Volyn region of Ukraine. He trained at the Kyiv State Choreographic School. Among his teachers were Volodymyr Denysenko and Vadym Avramenko.

A biographical profile published by the Ukrainian cultural newspaper Slovo Prosvity in 2009 states that Klymyuk completed his training with distinction in 1994.

After graduating, Klymyuk joined the ballet company of the National Opera of Ukraine in Kyiv. The National Opera records him as a member of its ballet company from 1994 to 1999. According to the 2009 newspaper profile, he became a soloist after two years and made his solo debut in The Nutcracker.

In 1999 Klymyuk moved to Germany and joined Theater Ulm. A later programme published by the Gran Teatre del Liceu in Barcelona records his earlier career with the National Ballet of Ukraine and Theater Ulm before he joined the Semperoper Ballet in Dresden in 2003.

The same Liceu biography records Klymyuk's promotion to second soloist in 2006. In 2012 he became a first soloist of the Semperoper Ballet. He remained with the Dresden company until 2015.

== Semperoper Ballet ==
During his years with the Semperoper Ballet, Klymyuk performed both classical and contemporary repertoire.

He danced Hilarion in David Dawson's reinterpretation of Giselle. During the company's guest performances at the Gran Teatre del Liceu in Barcelona in November 2010, Klymyuk appeared as Hilarion alongside Natalia Sologub as Giselle and Jiří Bubeníček as Albrecht.

Reviewing the production for El País, Carmen del Val discussed Sologub, Bubeníček and Klymyuk in the central roles and described their performances as technically virtuosic.

Klymyuk also danced Drosselmeyer in the Dresden production of The Nutcracker by Aaron S. Watkin and Jason Beechey. The production was performed by the Semperoper Ballet with the Staatskapelle Dresden and recorded for television in a production for MDR in cooperation with Arte and Unitel.

In a 2011 review in Die Welt, dance critic Hartmut Regitz discussed Klymyuk's interpretation of Drosselmeyer.

Among Klymyuk's other documented character roles was Kanj, the Great Brahmin, in Aaron S. Watkin's production of La Bayadère. A 2013 review by Pavol Juráš in Opera Plus discussed Klymyuk's interpretation of the role.

In Stijn Celis's production of Romeo and Juliet, which premiered at the Semperoper in March 2013, Klymyuk danced Count Capulet.

Klymyuk also appeared in Aaron S. Watkin's production of Swan Lake. Contemporary coverage of the 2009 Dresden production records him in the role of Rothbart.

== Work with William Forsythe ==
William Forsythe's choreography became a continuing part of Klymyuk's artistic work during his years in Dresden and later developed into work as a coach and stager.

In 2007 Klymyuk appeared with Semperoper dancer Elena Vostrotina in the ballet evening 2 For You at Hebbel am Ufer in Berlin. Reviewing the performance for Deutschlandfunk Kultur, Elisabeth Nehring discussed the pair's performance of an excerpt from Forsythe's In the Middle, Somewhat Elevated and their approach to his movement vocabulary.

At Ballet Asteras 2009 at the New National Theatre Tokyo, Klymyuk and Hiroko Asami performed the pas de deux from Forsythe's In the Middle, Somewhat Elevated.

In January 2010 he appeared with Jiří and Otto Bubeníček and selected dancers of the Semperoper Ballet at the Saitama Arts Theater in Japan. In Forsythe's Steptext, Klymyuk performed together with Elena Vostrotina, Jiří Bubeníček and Claudio Cangialosi.

In 2012 Klymyuk and Vostrotina appeared at the Dance Salad Festival in Houston. The festival archive documents the pair performing Forsythe's Bach.

The Houston Chronicle also reviewed their performance of a duet from In the Middle, Somewhat Elevated during the festival.

Forsythe's work also formed part of Klymyuk's repertoire at the Semperoper. The Semperoper's Semper! Magazin documented him in connection with the company's William Forsythe programme during the 2012–13 season.

In 2015 Klymyuk worked on Forsythe's New Suite at Pacific Northwest Ballet in Seattle. The company credits Laura Graham with staging the Handel and Berio duets and states that she was assisted by Klymyuk for the Bach duet. The Pacific Northwest Ballet premiere took place on 13 March 2015.

In 2026 Klymyuk returned to the National Opera of Ukraine, this time to stage two Forsythe works, Bach Duet and Slingerland Duet. The National Opera states that he was invited by the theatre to transmit the choreography to dancers of the company.

The two pieces were presented at the National Opera of Ukraine for the first time as part of the 4 Legends – Gala programme on 4 April 2026.

Ukrainian media also reported on Klymyuk's involvement in bringing the two Forsythe works to the National Opera.

== Teaching and ART of ==
Alongside his performing career, Klymyuk studied ballet pedagogy and choreography. His published biography states that he received a bachelor's degree in ballet pedagogy in 2012 and a master's degree in modern choreography in 2013.

In 2012 Klymyuk and fellow Semperoper dancer Fabien Voranger founded the ballet education project ART of. Dance writer Ilona Landgraf described ART of in a 2015 profile of Voranger as a project founded by Voranger and Klymyuk in 2012.

Klymyuk became director of ART of and continued to work as a ballet teacher, coach and ballet master.

ART of developed international intensive training programmes for young, pre-professional and professional dancers. Its summer courses in Madrid, Marseille and Zurich are listed by the Prix de Lausanne among its partner summer programmes.

== Personal life ==
Klymyuk became a German citizen in December 2018.
