= Korshiv =

Korshiv (Ukrainian: Коршів) may refer to the following places in Ukraine:

- Korshiv, Ivano-Frankivsk Oblast, village in Kolomyia Raion
- Korshiv, Rivne Oblast, village in Rivne Raion
- Korshiv, Volyn Oblast, village in Lutsk Raion
