= Kolky Republic =

Temporary Ukrainian state in 1943

Kolky Republic Колківська Республіка
- 13 May – 4 November 1943
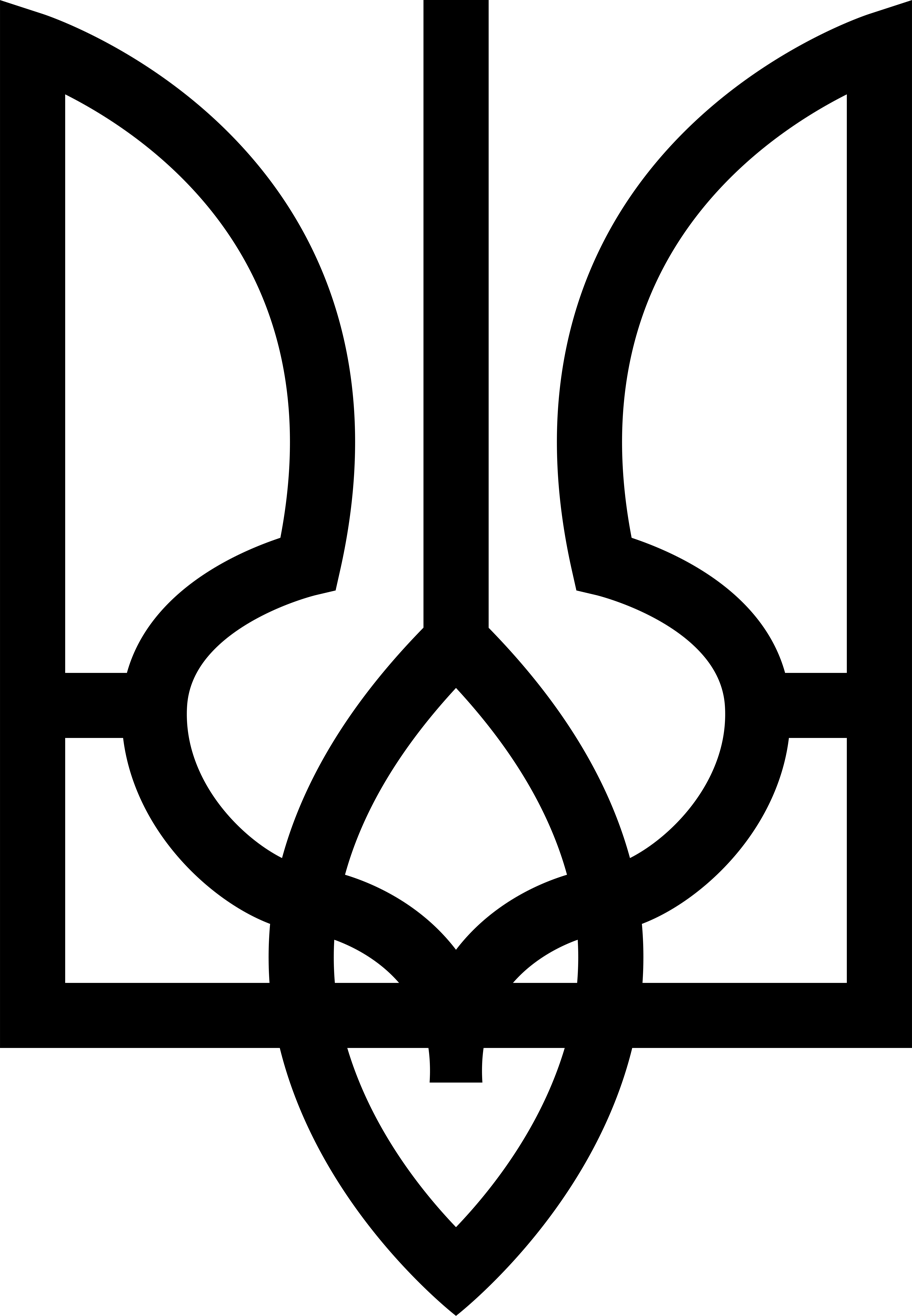
- Flag Coat of arms
- Anthem: Shche ne vmerla Ukrainy i slava, i volia
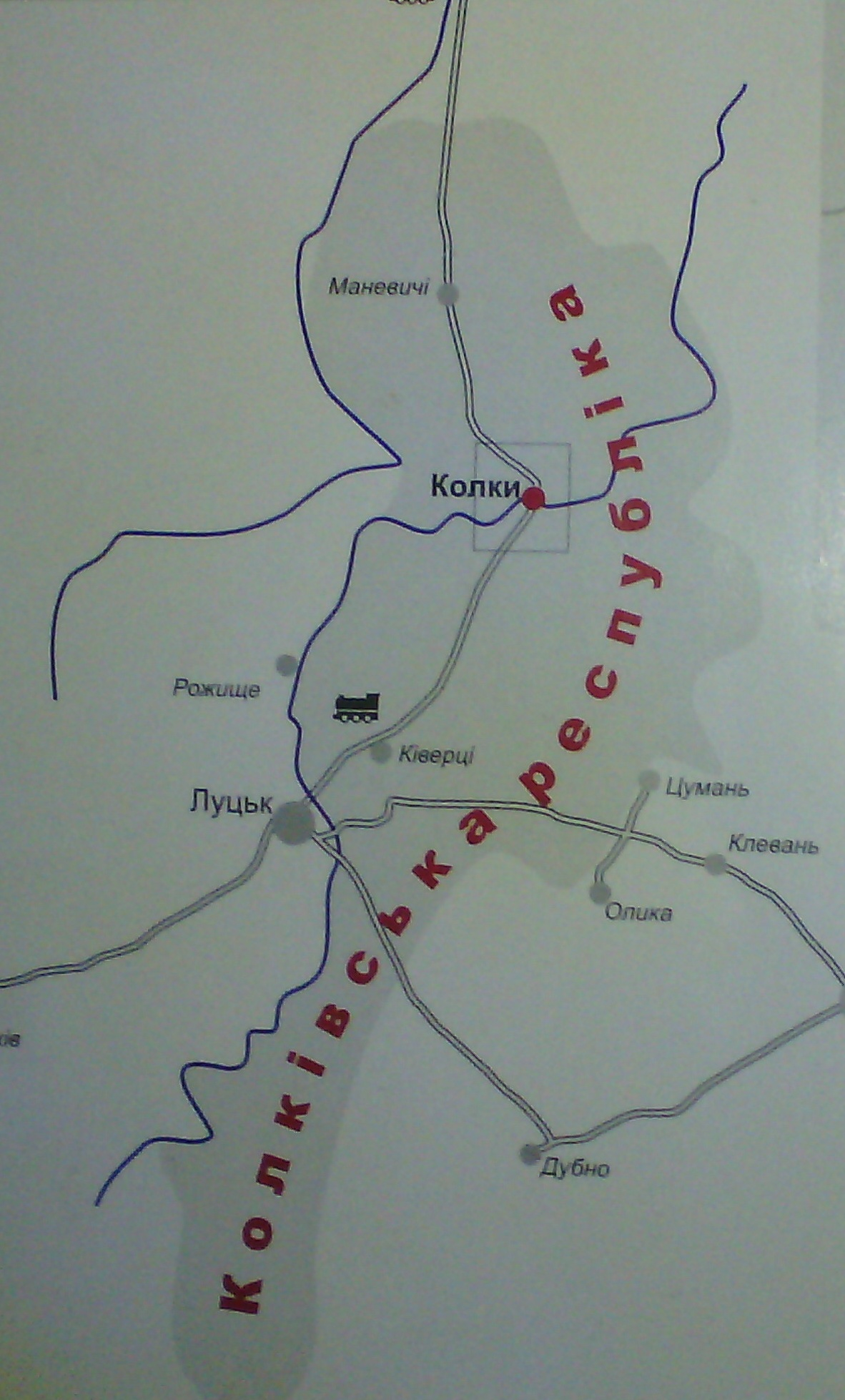
- Capital: Kolky
- Common languages: Ukrainian
- Government: Republic
- Commandant
  - 1943: Yuriy Shevchenko ("Moriak")
- Historical era: Second World War
  - Established: 13 May 1943
  - Disestablished: 4 November 1943
- Currency: Bofon

Kolky Republic (Ukrainian: Колківська Республіка) was a temporary state composed of five regions of Volyn, measuring approximately 2500 square kilometers, created in areas liberated from Nazi Germany by the Ukrainian Insurgent Army (UPA) and resistance fighters in Volyn. The state was named after its capital, the village of Kolky.

== History ==
In May 1943 a kurin of the Ukrainian Insurgent Army commanded by Mykola Kovtoniuk (alias "Oleh") and Stepan Koval ("Rubashenko") expelled the German garrison from Kolky. The republic was proclaimed on 13 May 1943 and consisted of 40 villages near Kolky. The polity had its own police force, ambulance service, court system, postal system and a counterintelligence unit that allegedly foiled a communist coup. The state also had its own currency, bofon, with banknotes designed by Robert Lisovskyi.

On 13 June 1943 Ukrainian inhabitants of Kolky Republic burned Roman Catholic church in Kolky killing about 40 Poles.

The Kolky Republic lasted until 4 November 1943, when it was retaken by Nazi Germany using artillery and air attacks. During the German air raids, up to 600 residents of Kolky were killed and the town almost burned to the ground. The settlement was captured by German motorized infantry advancing from Manevychi and supported by airborne forces.

== Administration ==
Kolky belonged to the "Turiv" military district under UPA control and housed a number of hospitals, an officers' school and various courses for soldiers. Local government was headed by Yuriy Shevchenko (alias "Moriak", "Roman"), a native of Kolky who served as the local agent of Sluzhba Bezpeky. After the fall of the area to the Soviet Army in 1944, Shevchenko remained active in UPA and was killed as a result of an ambush by Internal Troops on 1 January 1945.

== See also ==
- Carpatho-Ukraine
- Act of restoration of the Ukrainian state
- Massacres of Poles in Volhynia and Eastern Galicia
