= Rozhyshche urban hromada =

Rozhyshche urban hromada Рожищенська міська громада
- Hromada
- Interactive map of Rozhyshche urban hromada
- Country: Ukraine
- Oblast: Volyn
- Raion: Lutsk
- Admin. center: Rozhyshche

Area
  - Total: 465.8 km^{2} (179.8 sq mi)

Population (2020)
  - Total: 26,619
  - Density: 57.15/km^{2} (148.0/sq mi)
- CATOTTG code: UA07080250000053335
- Settlements: 37
- Cities: 1
- Rural settlements: 1
- Villages: 35

Rozhyshche urban territorial hromada (Ukrainian: Рожищенська міська територіальна громада) is one of the hromadas of Ukraine, located in Lutsk Raion in Volyn Oblast. Its administrative centre is the city of Rozhyshche.

The hromada has an area of 465.8 km^{2} (179.8 mi^{2}), as well as a population of 26,619 (as of 2020).

On July 19, 2020, as a result of the administrative-territorial reform and liquidation of the Rozhyshche Raion, the community became part of the newly formed Lutsk Raion.

== Composition ==
In addition to one city (Rozhyshche), the hromada contains 1 rural settlement (Dubyshche) and 35 villages:

- Berehove
- Bohushivska Marianivka
- Bortiakhivka
- Dmytrivka
- Dukhche
- Ivanivka
- Kobche
- Korsyni
- Kozyn
- Kryzhivka
- Litohoshcha
- Lukiv
- Lynivka
- Malynivka
- Mylsk
- Myroslavka
- Mykhailyn
- Naviz
- Nezvir
- Nosachevychi
- Olhanivka
- Olenivka
- Oleshkovychi
- Perespa
- Pozharky
- Rudka-Kozynska
- Rudnia, Lutsk Raion, Volyn Oblast
- Sokil, Lutsk Raion, Volyn Oblast
- Topilne
- Trylistsi
- Tykhotyn
- Valerianivka
- Vyshenky
- Yelyzavetyn
- Zabara
