= Horokhiv urban hromada =

Horokhiv urban hromada Горохівська міська громада
- Hromada
- Interactive map of Horokhiv urban hromada
- Country: Ukraine
- Oblast: Volyn
- Raion: Lutsk
- Admin. center: Horokhiv

Area
  - Total: 4,981 km^{2} (1,923 sq mi)

Population (2020)
  - Total: 24 709
  - Density: 0.0048/km^{2} (0.012/sq mi)
- CATOTTG code: UA07080070000052255
- Settlements: 42
- Cities: 1
- Villages: 41

Horokhiv urban territorial hromada (Ukrainian: Горохівська міська територіальна громада) is one of the hromadas of Ukraine, located in Lutsk Raion in Volyn Oblast. Its administrative centre is the city of Horokhiv.

The hromada has an area of 498.1 km^{2} (192.3 mi^{2}), as well as a population of 24,709 (as of 2020).

On July 19, 2020, as a result of the administrative-territorial reform and liquidation of the Horokhiv Raion, the hromada became part of the newly formed Lutsk Raion.

== Composition ==
In addition to one city (Horokhiv), the hromada contains 41 villages:

- Bystrovytsia
- Desiatyna
- Dibrova
- Kholoniv
- Kovban
- Koziatyn
- Krasiv
- Kryzhova
- Kumovyshche
- Kvasiv
- Lemeshiv
- Markovychi
- Myrkiv
- Myrne
- Myslyni
- Novosilky
- Okhlopiv
- Oshchiv
- Ozertsi
- Pechykhvosty
- Pidberezzia
- Pirvanche
- Poliukhne
- Pustomyty
- Rachyn
- Siltse
- Skabarivshchyna
- Skobelka
- Sofiivka
- Starostav
- Strilche
- Tereshkivtsi
- Umantsi
- Vatyn
- Vatynets
- Vilkhivka
- Volytsia-Druzhkopilska
- Yarivka
- Zelenoluzhne
- Zhuravnyky
- Zvyniache
