= Marianivka, Marianivka settlement hromada, Lutsk Raion, Volyn Oblast =

Rural locality in Volyn Oblast, Ukraine

Marianivka Мар'янівка
- Rural settlement
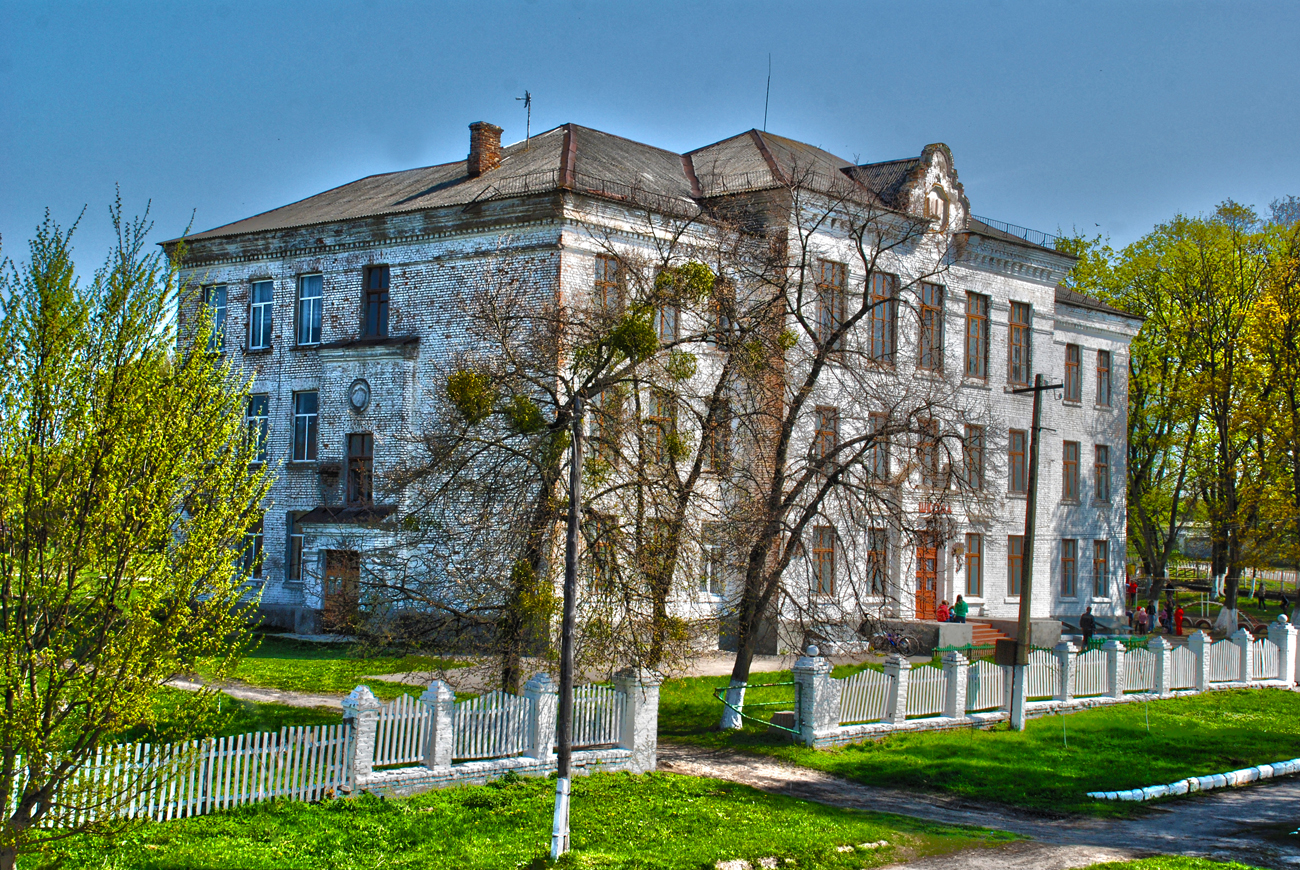
- School in Maryanivka

- Location of Marianivka Marianivka (Ukraine)
- Coordinates: 50°27′15″N 24°48′49″E
- Country: Ukraine
- Oblast: Volyn Oblast
- Raion: Lutsk Raion
- Hromada: Marianivka settlement hromada

Area
  - Total: 20.6 km^{2} (8.0 sq mi)
- Elevation: 205 m (673 ft)

Population (2024)
  - Total: 2,562
  - Density: 1,362.62/km^{2} (3,529.2/sq mi)
- Postal code: 45744

Marianivka (Ukrainian: Мар'янівка; Polish: Marianówka; Belarusian: Мар'янаўка, romanized: Marjanaŭka) is a rural settlement in Lutsk Raion, Volyn Oblast, western Ukraine. Marianivka is located on the Hnyla Lypa River. Population: 2,676 (2022 estimate).

== History ==
Historical affiliations

Polish–Lithuanian Commonwealth until 1795
Russian Empire 1795–1917
Ukrainian People's Republic 1917-1918, 1918-1919
Second Polish Republic 1919–1945
Soviet Union 1939–1941 (occupation)
Nazi Germany 1941–1944 (occupation)
Soviet Union 1944–1945 (occupation)
Soviet Union 1945–1991
Ukraine 1991–present

Marianivka was founded at the beginning of the 18th century, from Polish immigrants. Then the settlement was named Musin. But these lands have been inhabited much earlier. This is evidenced by archaeological finds. Specifically, in 1928 on the outskirts Marianivka, near the village Borochychi during a mound of the future rail Lviv - Lutsk at a depth of 1m was found a huge treasure of silver and gold Roman coins in the number of 1500 copies. However, this figure is probably understated, because, according to eyewitnesses, the total weight of the treasure was over 50 kg. Hamlet Musin was named until 1921, and in 1921 the Polish authorities renamed colony Musin to village Marianivka.

From 1940 till 1962 it was the center of Marianivka, Marianivka District, Volyn Oblast (province).

The status of urban settlement received in 1958.

In 1974 there were three factories: a sugar factory (the largest one), a cheese factory and a canning factory.

After 1995 the cheese factory and the canning factory were closed.

On 26 January 2024, a new law entered into force which abolished the urban-type settlement status, and Marianivka became a rural settlement.

== Attractions ==
In Marianivka there are two schools, park, rail station, fire station, police department, hospital, post office, stores, bars, cafe, bank, gym, recently built supermarket and car wash, body shop and a local Marianivka soccer team.
