= Horokhiv =

City in Volyn Oblast, Ukraine

Horokhiv Горохів Horochów (in Polish)
- City
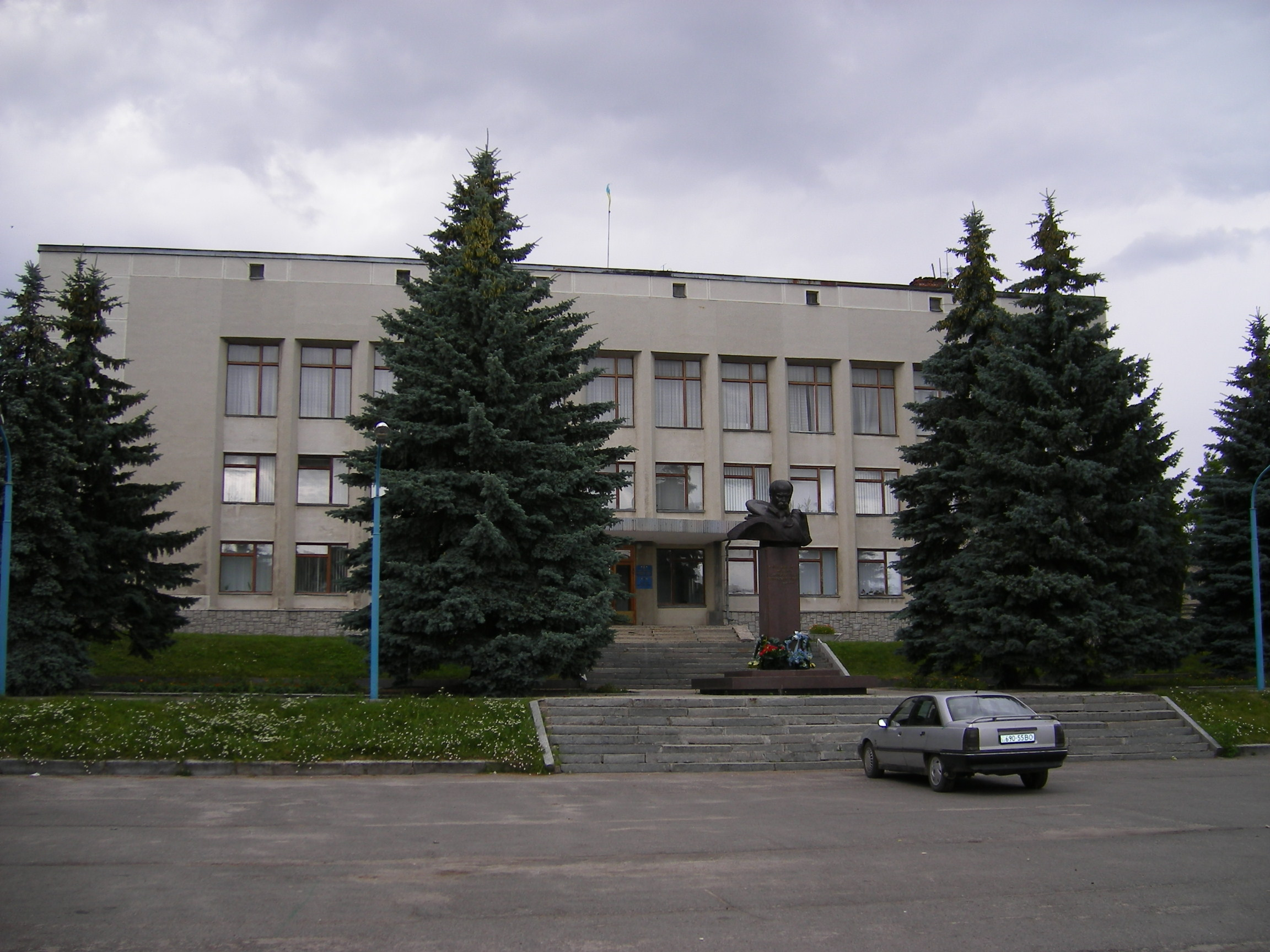
- Former Horokhiv District Administration Building

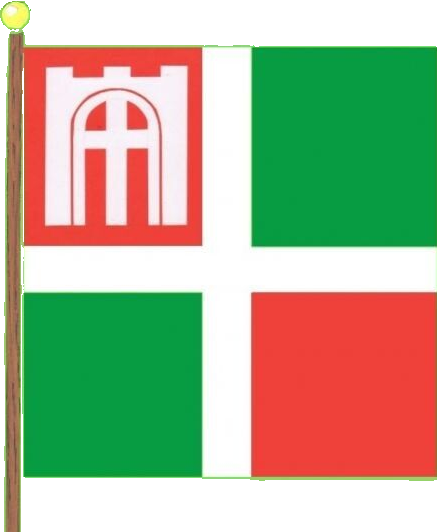
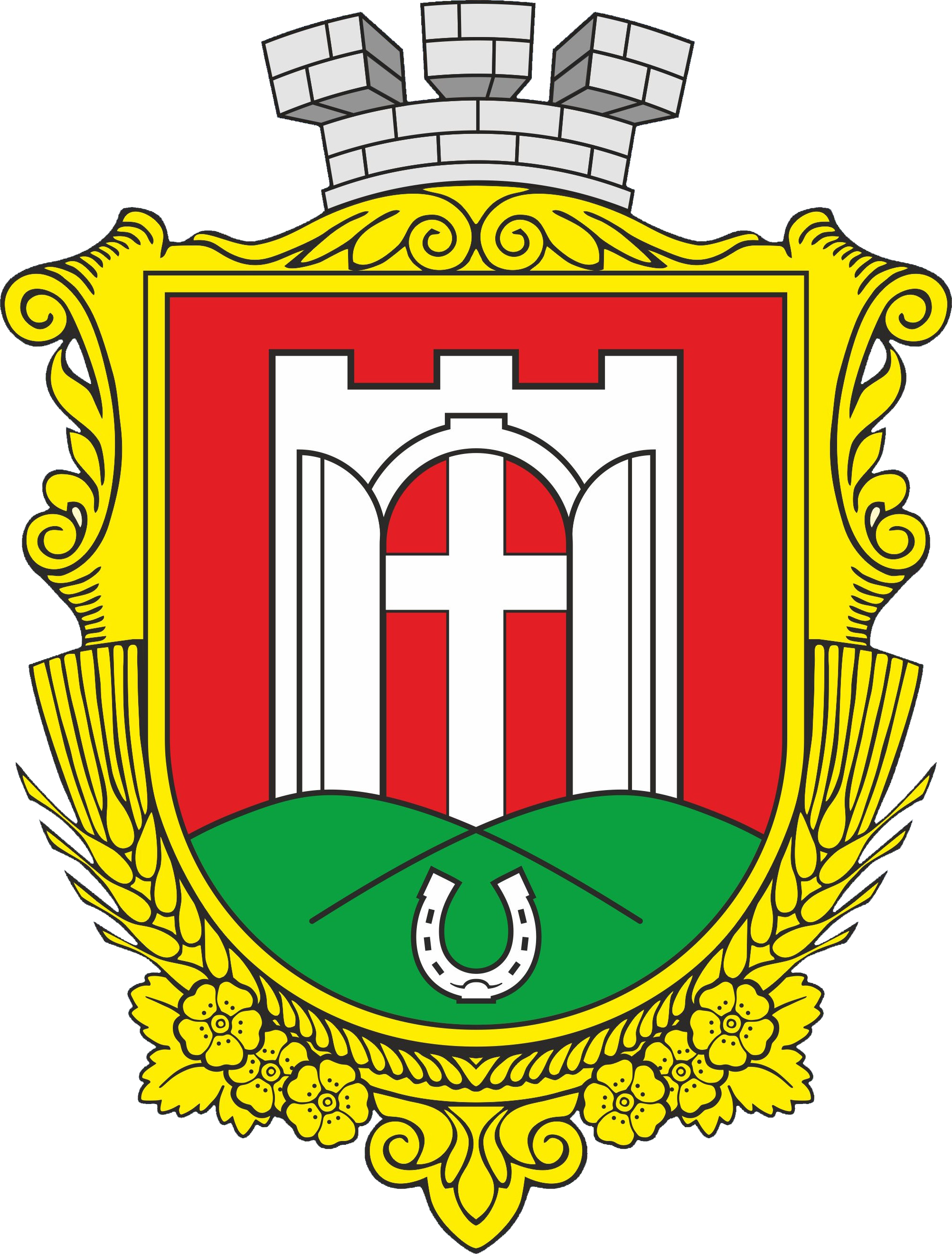
- Flag Coat of arms

- Location within Volyn Oblast Location within Ukraine
- Coordinates: 50°29′58″N 24°45′54″E
- Country: Ukraine
- Oblast: Volyn Oblast
- Raion: Lutsk Raion
- Hromada: Horokhiv urban hromada

Government
  - Mayor: Viktor Hodyk
- Elevation: 213 m (699 ft)

Population (2022)
  - Total: 8,925

Horokhiv (Ukrainian: Горохів, IPA: [ɦoˈrɔxiu̯]; Polish: Horochów; Yiddish: ארכעוו, romanized: Arkhev) is a small town in Volyn Oblast, in north-western Ukraine. Population: 8,925 (2022 estimate).

== Geography ==
Horokhiv is located 52 km from the regional center of Lutsk and 440 km from Kyiv. It lies in the Volhynian Upland, at a watershed between the Styr (tributary of the Pripyat) and Buh rivers. The surrounding area is known for its rich agricultural lands and mixed forests. The area of the town is 488 hectares.

The climate is moderately continental with mild winters (in January -4.4 °, -5.1 °) and warm wet summer (in July +18.8 °). Rainfall 550–640 mm per year.

Horokhiv is the center of the Horokhiv urban territorial community.

== History ==
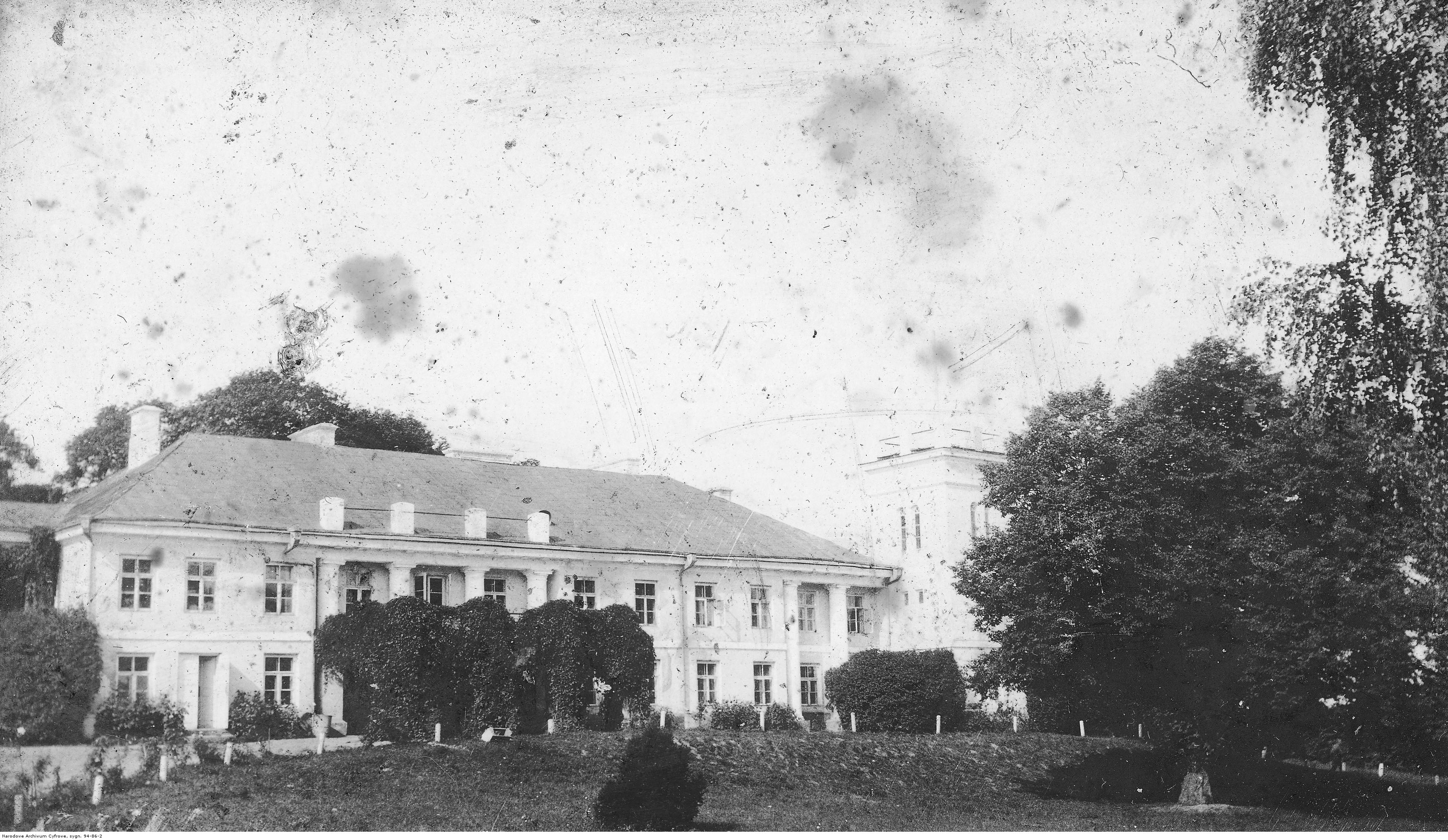
Stroynowski Palace during World War I

Horokhiv was first mentioned under 1240 in the Hypatian Codex.

It was a private town, administratively located in the Volhynian Voivodeship in the Lesser Poland Province of the Kingdom of Poland. Polish politician and economist Walerian Stroynowski built a palace in the town.

From the Third Partition of Poland of 1795 until the Russian Revolution of 1917, it was part of Volhynian Governorate of the Russian Empire; from 1921 to 1939 it was part of Wołyń Voivodeship of Poland. A railway station was built here in 1924–1925. In 1931 the town had around 6,000 inhabitants.

Following the German-Soviet invasion of Poland, which started World War II in September 1939, it was occupied by the Soviet Union until 1941. In 1939 it became a town. A local newspaper is published here since 1939.

The Germans occupied the town from summer 1941 to July 1944. Its Jewish population, comprising over half the town's inhabitants, was murdered en masse during The Holocaust.

Under the Soviet rule Horokhiv was known as a centre of agricultural machinery production. It served as the administrative center of Horokhiv Raion prior to its dissolution in 2020. Since then, Horokhiv has been a part of Lutsk Raion.

== Demographics ==
As of the 2001 Ukrainian census, Horokhiv had a population of 8,847 inhabitants. The ethnic and linguitic composition of the local population according to the census was as follows:

Ethnic groups in Horokhiv
	percent
Ukrainians	98.13%
Russians	1.44%
Belarusians	0.16%
Georgians	0.12%
others	0.15%

Native languages in Horokhiv
	percent
Ukrainian	98.6%
Russian	1.2%
others	0.1%

== Gallery ==
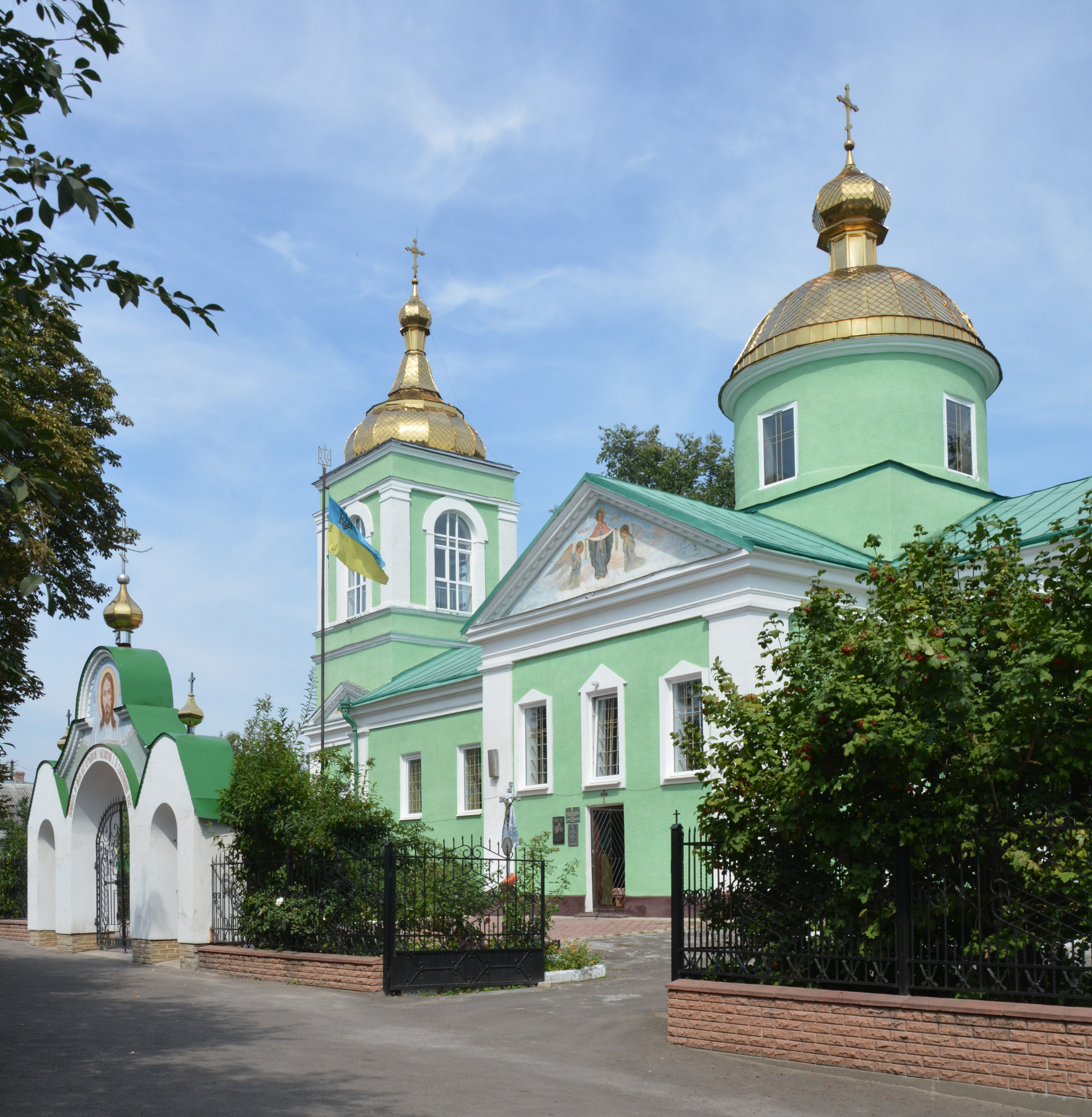
Ascension Church (1844)

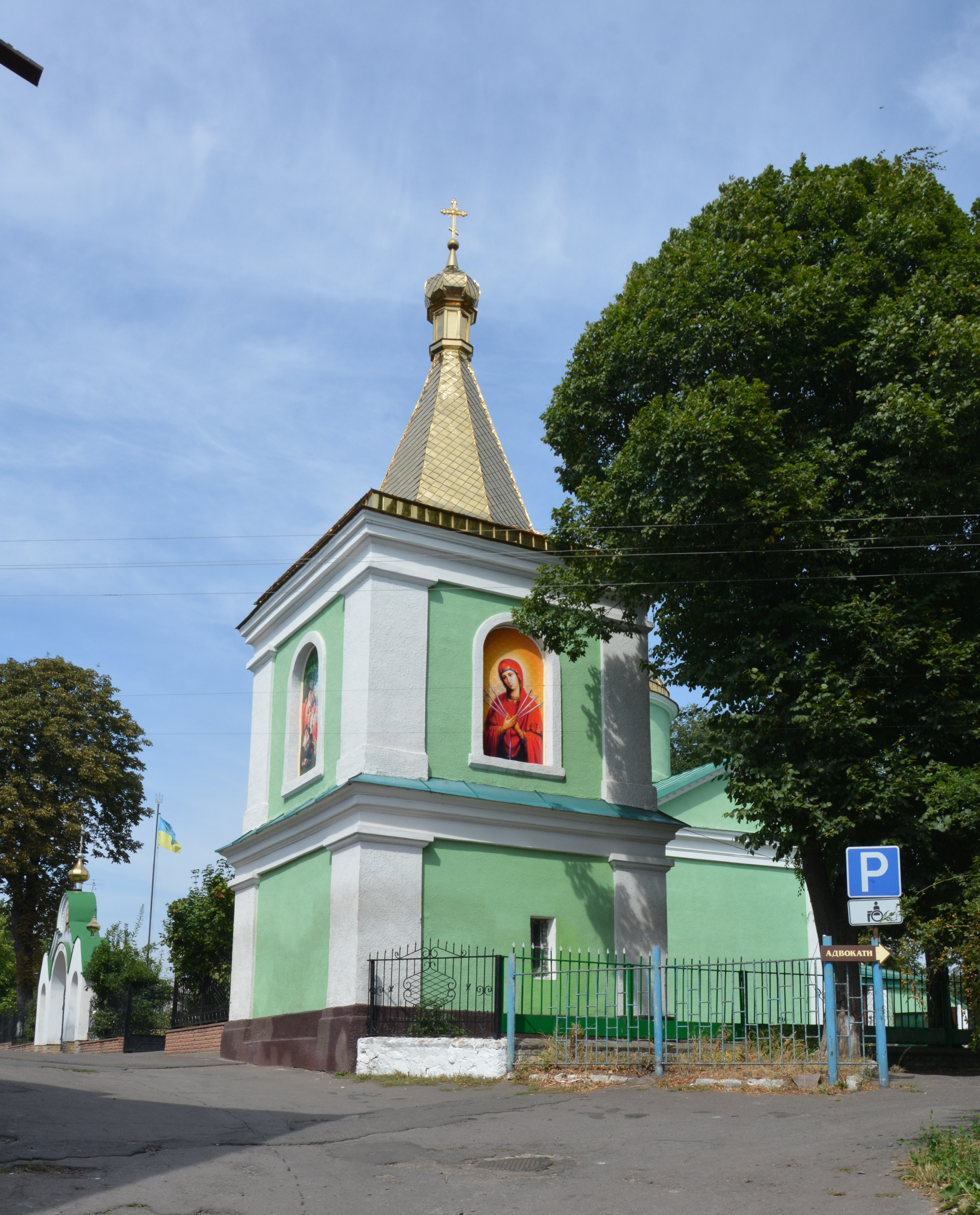
Ascension Church bell tower (1844)

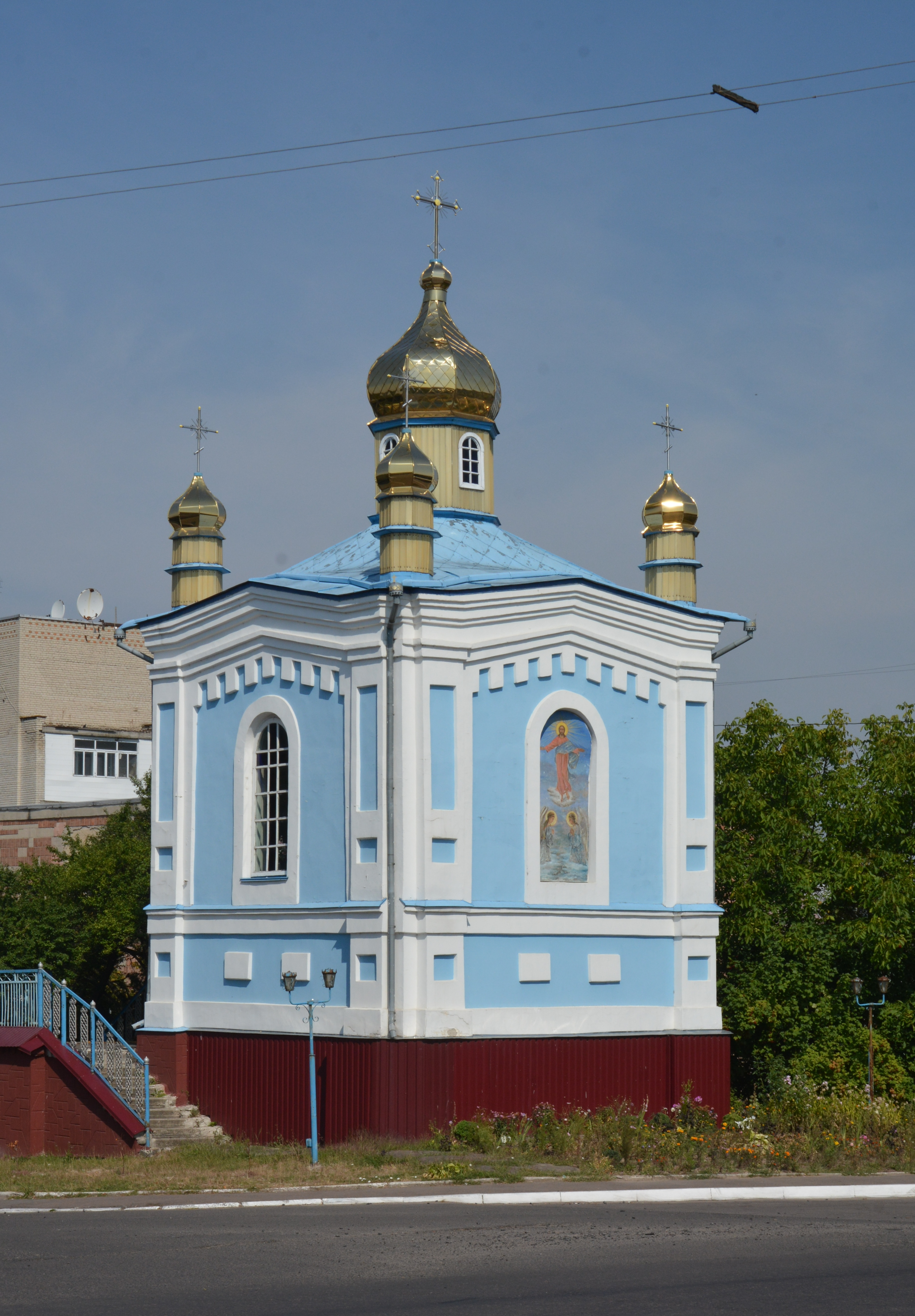
Ascension chapel (1871)

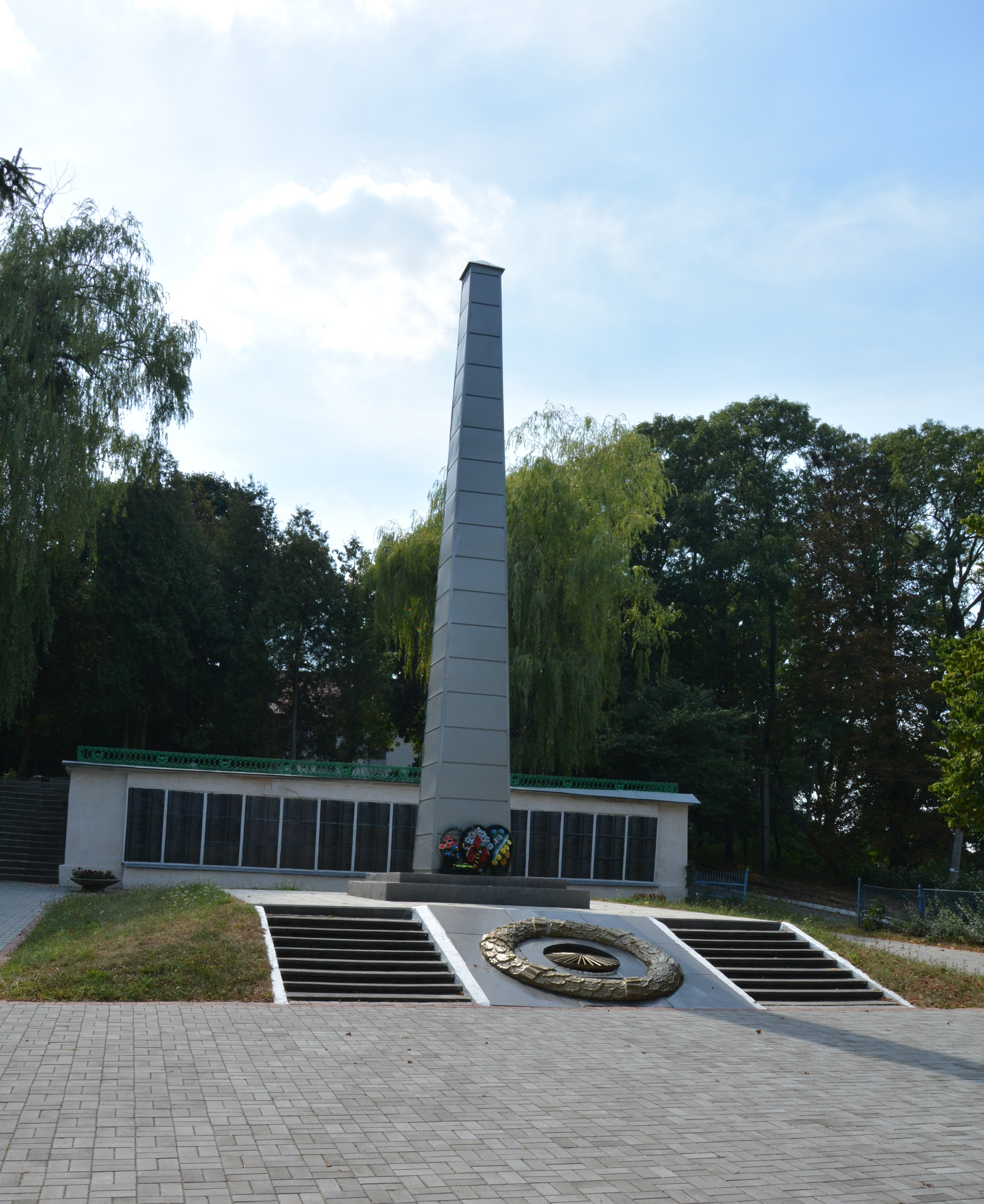
World War II Memorial

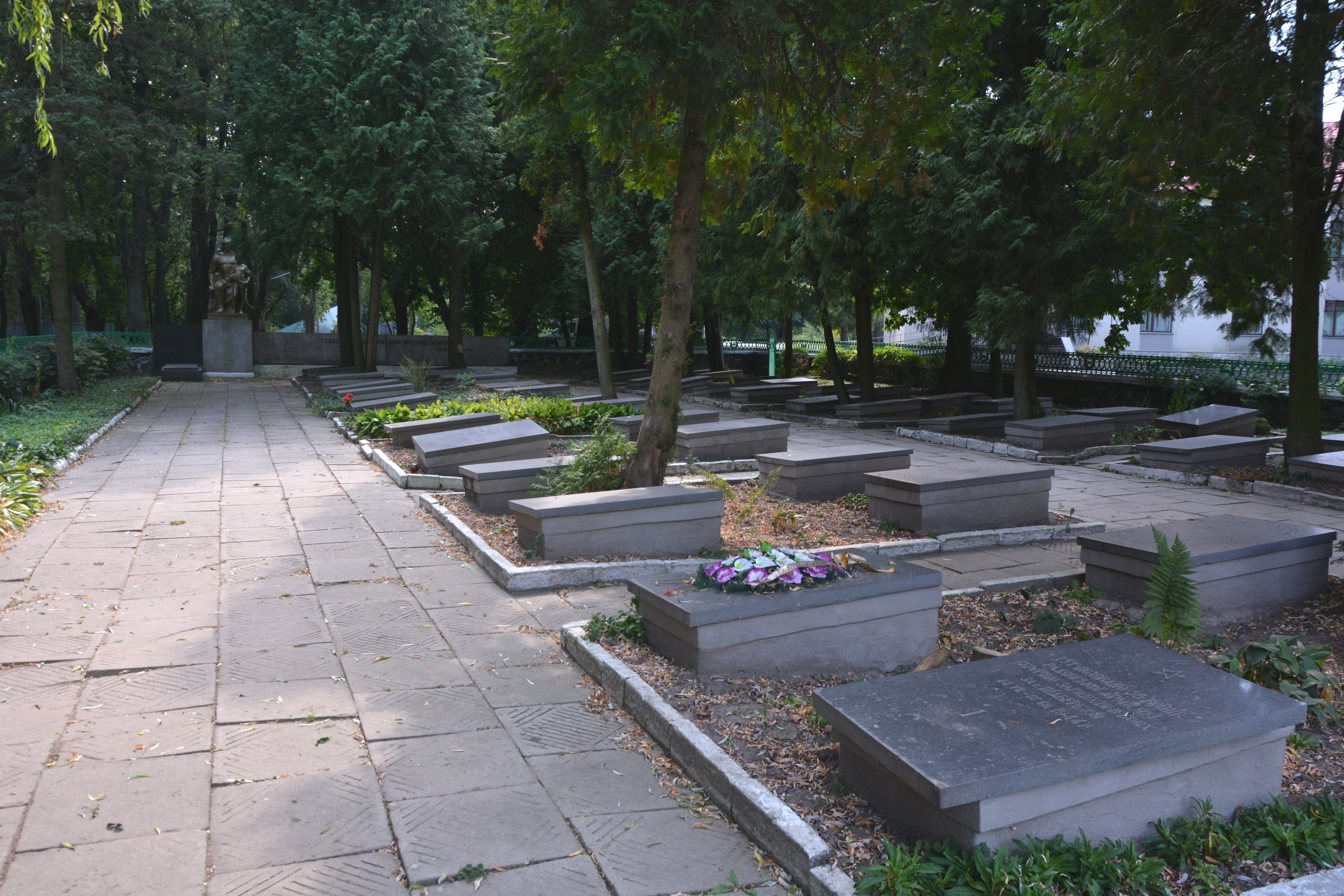
Mass graves of World War II soldiers
