= Tsuman =

Rural locality in Volyn Oblast, Ukraine

Tsuman Цумань
- Rural settlement
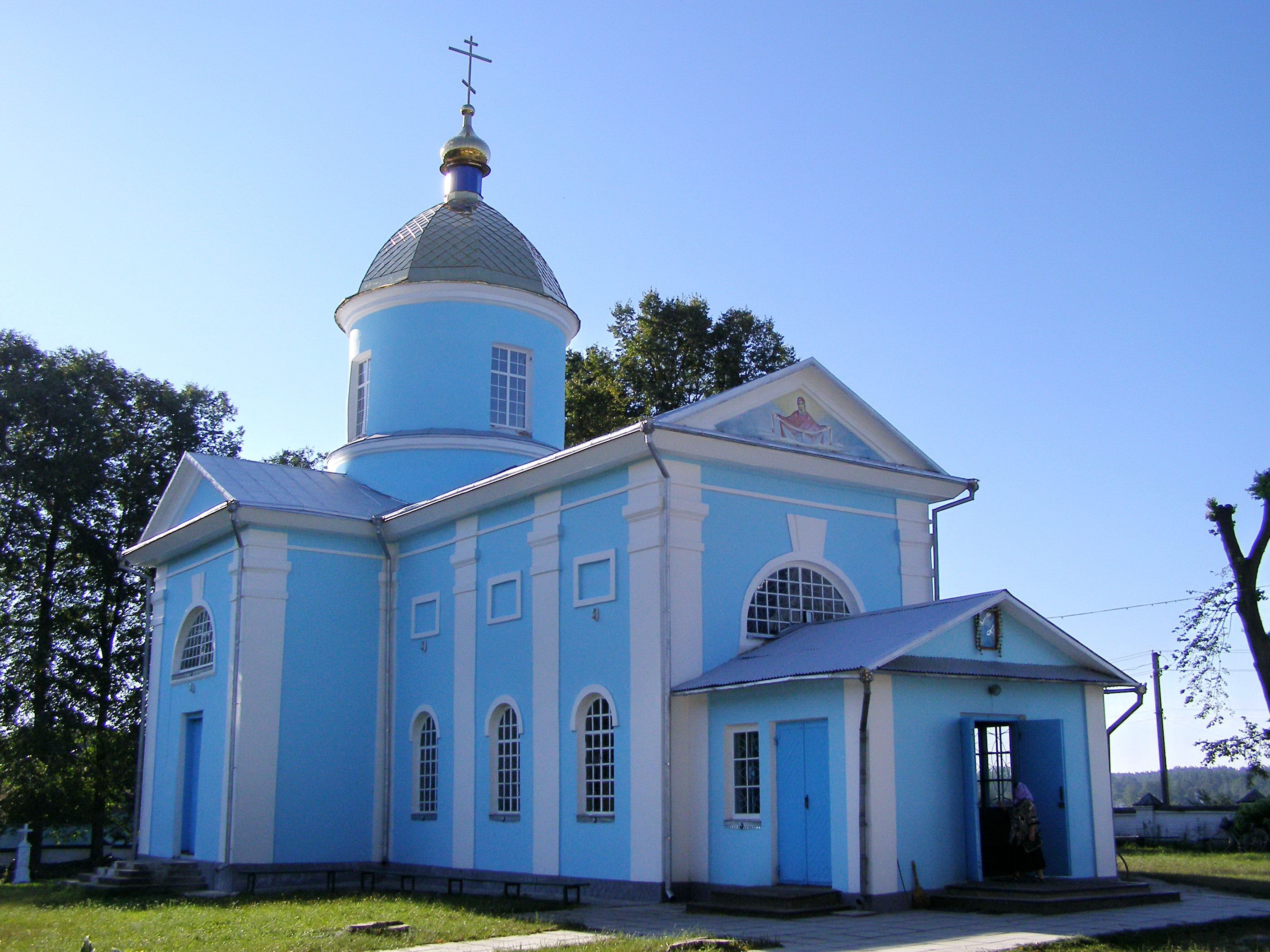
- Church of the Intercession

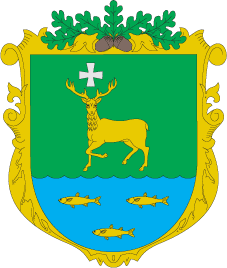
- Flag Coat of arms

- Location in Volyn Oblast Location in Ukraine
- Coordinates: 50°49′56″N 25°53′10″E
- Country: Ukraine
- Oblast: Volyn Oblast
- Raion: Lutsk Raion
- Hromada: Tsuman settlement hromada

Population (2022)
  - Total: 6,579
- Time zone: UTC+2 (EET)
  - Summer (DST): UTC+3 (EEST)

Tsuman (Ukrainian: Цумань; Polish: Cumań) is a rural settlement in Lutsk Raion, Volyn Oblast, western Ukraine. It is located on the left bank of the Putylivka in the drainage basin of the Pripyat. Population: 6,579 (2022 estimate).

== History ==
Until 26 January 2024, Tsuman was designated urban-type settlement. On this day, a new law entered into force which abolished this status, and Tsuman became a rural settlement.

== Geography ==
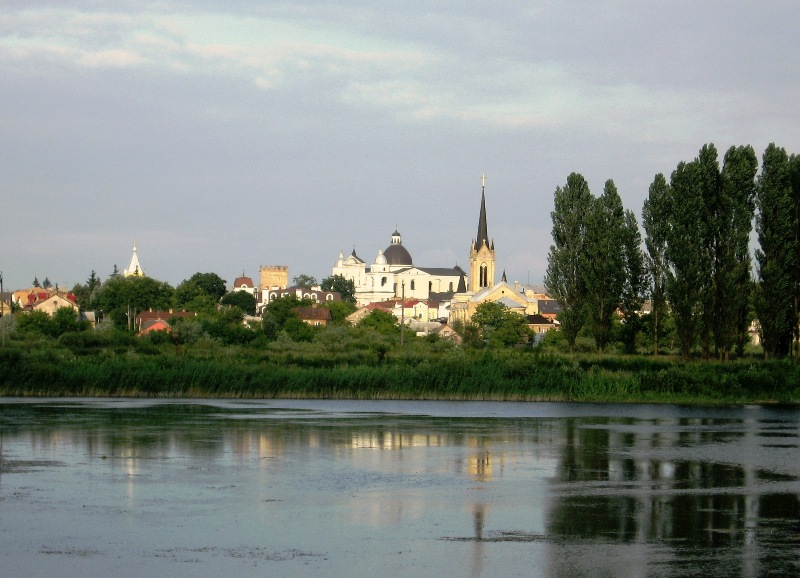
Lutsk old town and the Styr

Tsuman is located in the Volhynian Upland. The area of the city is 723.44 hectares. The area of the area is located in the area of mixed forests, on the river Putylivka, left tributary of the Horyn River (tributary of the Pripyat).

The climate is moderately continental with mild winters (in January -4.4 °, -5.1 °) and warm wet summer (in July +18.8 °). Rainfall 550–640 mm per year.

Tsuman is the center of the Tsuman urban territorial community.

Tsumanska Pushcha National Nature Park is located in the area surrounding the locality.

== Economy ==
The city has developed forestry and woodworking.

=== Transportation ===
Tsuman railway station is located about 10 kilometres (6.2 mi) south of the settlement, on the railway connecting Rivne with Lutsk and Kovel. There is infrequent passenger traffic. Suburban electric trains with the Zdolbuniv - Lutsk /Kovel route stop at the station. The settlement has access to Highway H22 connecting Lutsk with Rivne.
