= Tsumanska Pushcha National Nature Park =

National park in Ukraine

- Ukrainian: Національний природний парк «Цуманська пуща»
- IUCN category II (national park)
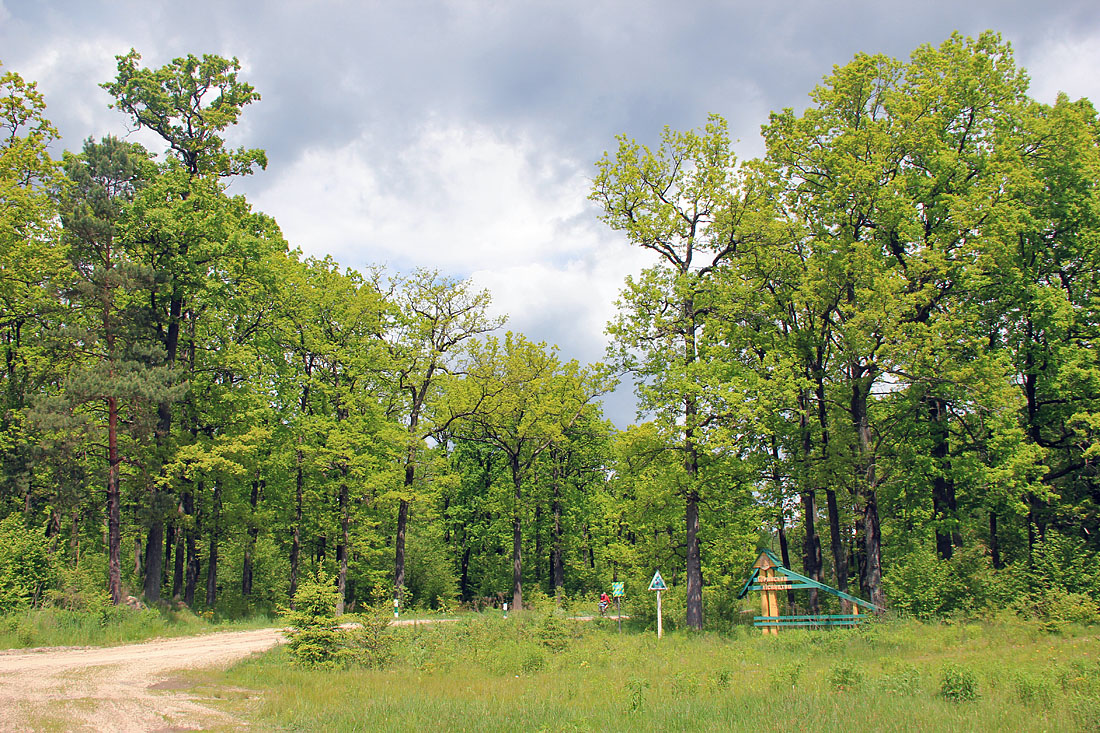

- Location within Ukraine
- Location: Volyn Oblast, Ukraine
- Nearest city: Kivertsi
- Coordinates: 50°56′N 25°53′E
- Area: 33,475 hectares (334.75 km^{2})
- Established: 2010

Tsumanska Pushcha National Nature Park (Ukrainian: Національний природний парк Цуманська Пуща) is a national park of Ukraine, located in the east of Volyn Oblast. At the end of August 2023, for the first time in Ukraine, a rare royal fern, Osmunda regalis, was discovered in the Tsumanska Pushcha. In May of 2026, the park received a donation of camera traps from the United Nations Development Programme (UNDP).
