= Korshiv, Volyn Oblast =

Coordinates: 50°39′44″N 25°7′40″E

Korshiv (Ukrainian: Коршів) is a village in the Lutsk Raion (district) of Volyn Oblast (province) of western Ukraine.

Before World War II this village belonged to Poland and its name was Korszów. Korszów village is situated in Western Ukraine, about 15 km (9.3 mi) to the WSW of Lutsk, and 72 km (45 mi) to the east of Poland's eastern state boundary. This place lies near the northern scarp of the Volhynia Upland covered with loess. The loess profile exposed and studied in the Korszów village contains the best known, very typical example of the pedocomplex consisting of two paleosols from the Lublin Interglacial (210,000 - 230,000 BP). That is why this pedocomplex was named Korshov, and this name was used in the Ukrainian scientific literature for the first time by Andrey Bogutsky from the National University in L’viv.
