= Walerian Stroynowski =

Polish nobleman, politician and economist

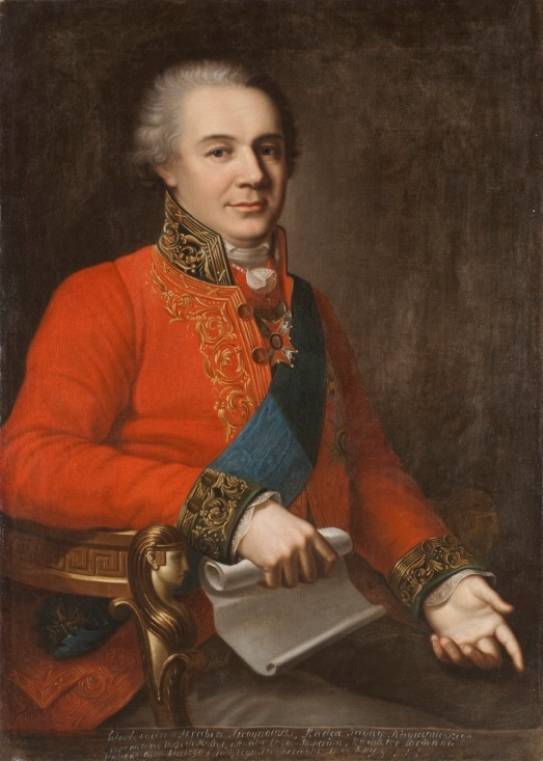
Walerian Stroynowski

Walerian Antoni Stroynowski (14 April 1759 - 12 November 1834) was a Polish nobleman, politician, and economist. He was a deputy to the Great Sejm (1788-1791), where he supported the Constitution of 3 May 1791 reform movement. In addition to political reform, he also advocated physiocracy. He was an author of a number of letters, speeches, and pamphlets.
