= Domanovo =

Domanovo Доманово
- Village
- Location within Vologda Oblast Location within Russia
- Coordinates: 59°27′N 39°07′E
- Country: Russia
- Region: Vologda Oblast
- District: Vologodsky District
- Time zone: UTC+3:00

Domanovo (Russian: Доманово) is a rural locality (a village) in Kubenskoye Rural Settlement, Vologodsky District, Vologda Oblast, Russia. The population was 24 as of 2002.

== Geography ==
Domanovo is located 68 km northwest of Vologda (the district's administrative centre) by road. Viktovo is the nearest rural locality.
