= Rozhyshche =

City in Volyn Oblast, Ukraine

Rozhyshche Рожище Rożyszcze (in Polish)
- City
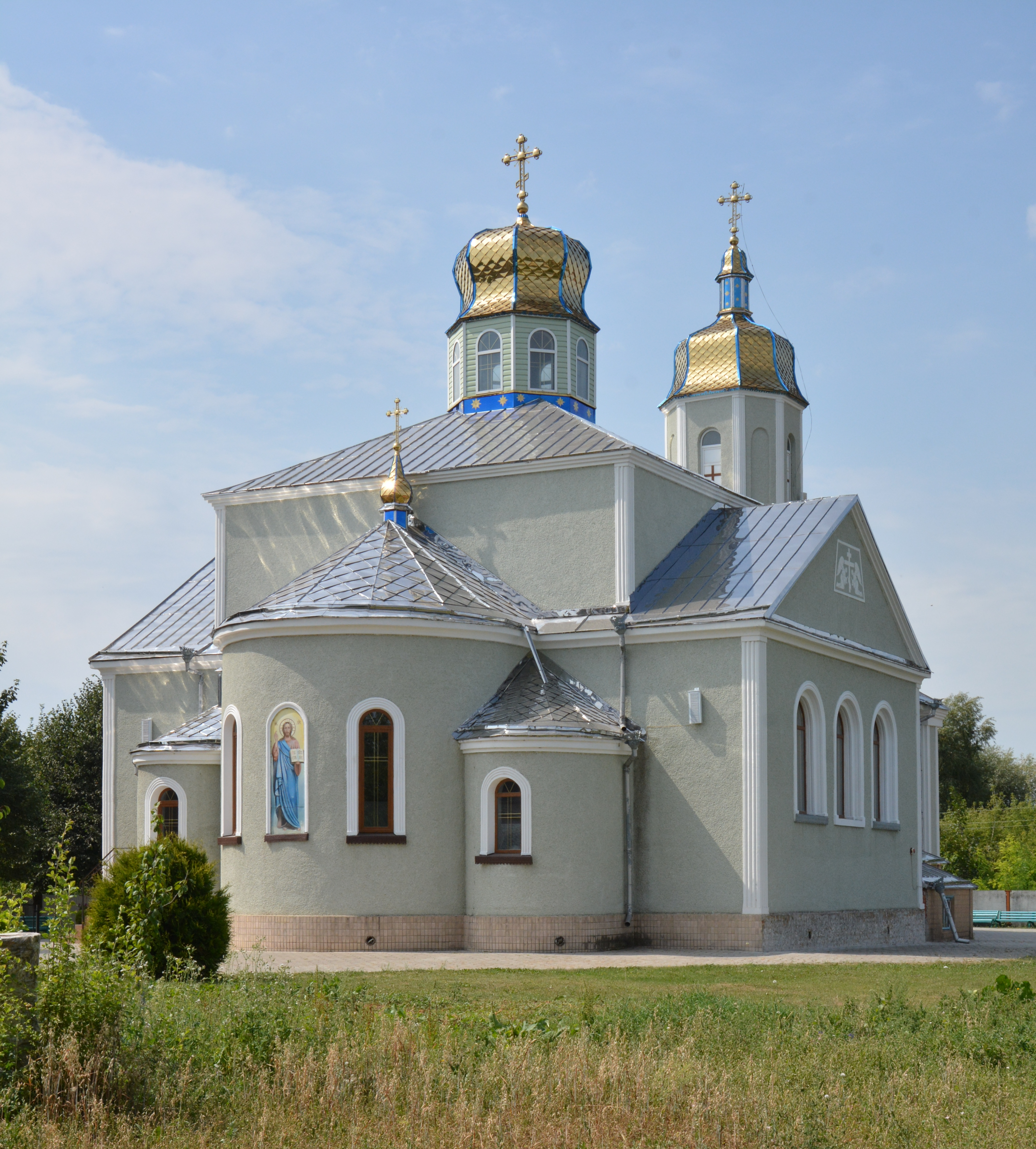
- St. Michael Church

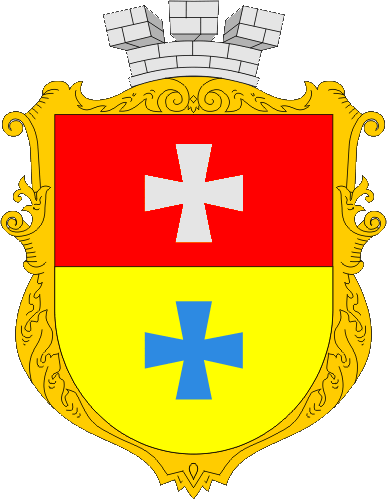
- Flag Coat of arms

- Location within Volyn Oblast Location within Ukraine
- Coordinates: 50°54′47″N 25°16′12″E
- Country: Ukraine
- Oblast: Volyn Oblast
- Raion: Lutsk Raion
- Hromada: Rozhyshche urban hromada

Government
  - Mayor: Vjacheslav Polishchuk
- Elevation: 182 m (597 ft)

Population (2022)
  - Total: ▲12,483
- Website: http://mrada.org.ua/

Rozhyshche (Ukrainian: Рожище, IPA: [ˈrɔʒɪʃtʃe]; Polish: Rożyszcze; Yiddish: ראזשישטש, romanized: Rozhishch) is a city in Volyn Oblast, in north-western Ukraine. It serves as an administrative center of Rozhyshche urban hromada. Population: 12,483 (2022 estimate).

It is situated on the Styr river in the historic region of Volhynia.

== Geography ==
Rozhyshche is located in the Volhynian Upland. The town of Rozhyshche is located 22 km by road from the regional center (Lutsk). The area of the area is located in the area of mixed forests and the river basin Styr (tributary of the Pripyat). The climate is moderately continental with mild winters (in January -4.4 °, -5.1 °) and warm wet summer (in July +18.8 °). Rainfall 550–640 mm per year. Most precipitation falls in summer.

== History ==
Historical population
Year	Pop.	±%
1870	860	—
1921	3,263	+279.4%

The first written mention of Rozhyshche dates back to 1322, when the Lutsk prince Lyubart Gedyminovych donated it to the cathedral church of John the Theologian.

In 1567, the Polish king Sigismund Augustus granted the city the Magdeburg Right (the right to self-government). After the Union of Lublin in 1569, Rozhyshche (Polish: Rožyšče) became part of the Volyn Voivodeship of the Polish-Lithuanian Commonwealth. In 1598, the city received its own coat of arms.

In 1795, as a result of the Third Partition of Poland, the settlement was annexed by the Russian Empire, within which it was administratively located in Lutsky Uyezd in Volhynian Governorate. It saw an influx of Jews as a result of Russian discriminatory policies (see Pale of Settlement).

In the interwar period, it was the seat of a gmina, administratively located in the Łuck County in the Wołyń Voivodeship of Poland. According to the 1921 census, the town's population was 79.8% Jewish, 9.2% Polish, 5.7% German, 4.1% Ukrainian.

Following the joint German-Soviet invasion of Poland, which started World War II in September 1939, it was initially occupied by the Soviet Union, then by Nazi Germany from June 1941, and then once again by the Soviets from 1944.

A local newspaper is published here since January 1945.

In January 1989 the population was 14 391 people. City since August 1989.

== Demographics ==
As of the 2001 Ukrainian census, Rozhyshche had a population of 13,511 inhabitants. The ethnic and linguistic composition of the population at the time of the census was as follows:

Ethnic groups in Rozhyshche
	percent
Ukrainians	97.81%
Russians	1.54%
Belarusians	0.29%
Poles	0.16%
others	0.20%

Native languages in Rozhyshche
	percent
Ukrainian	98.5%
Russian	1.3%
Belarusian	0.1%
others	0.1%

== Gallery ==
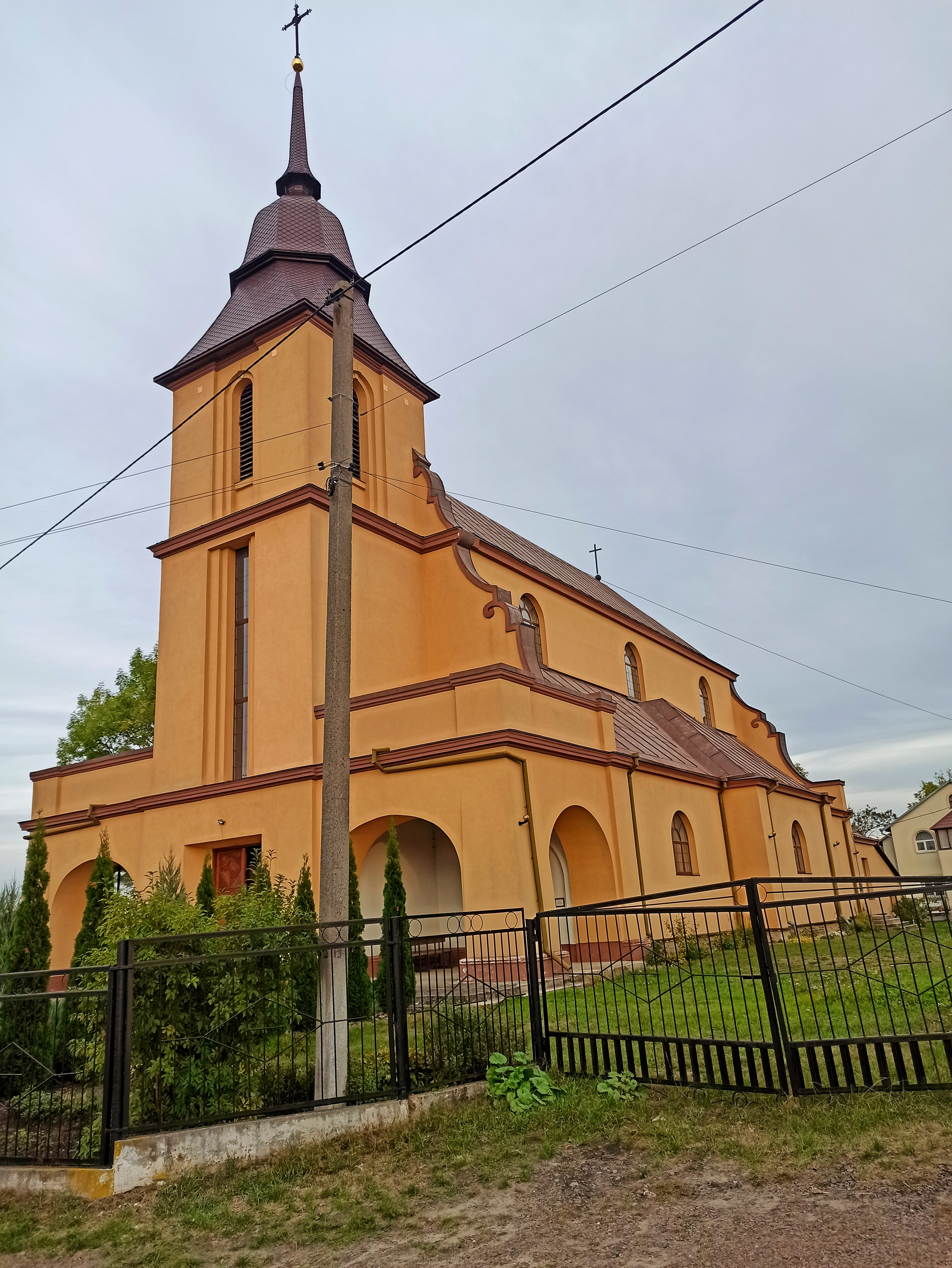
Transfiguration Church (1920)

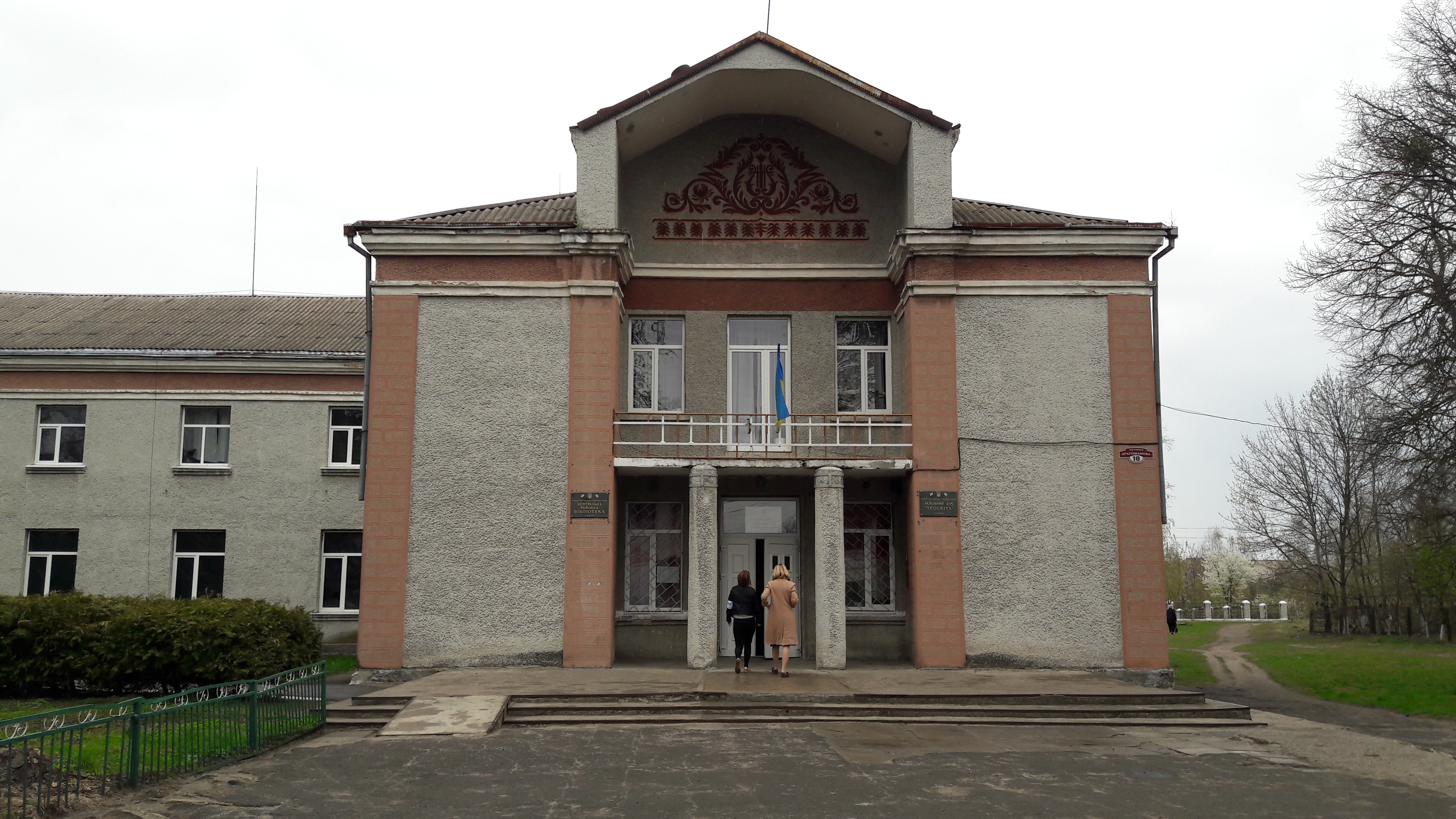
House of Culture

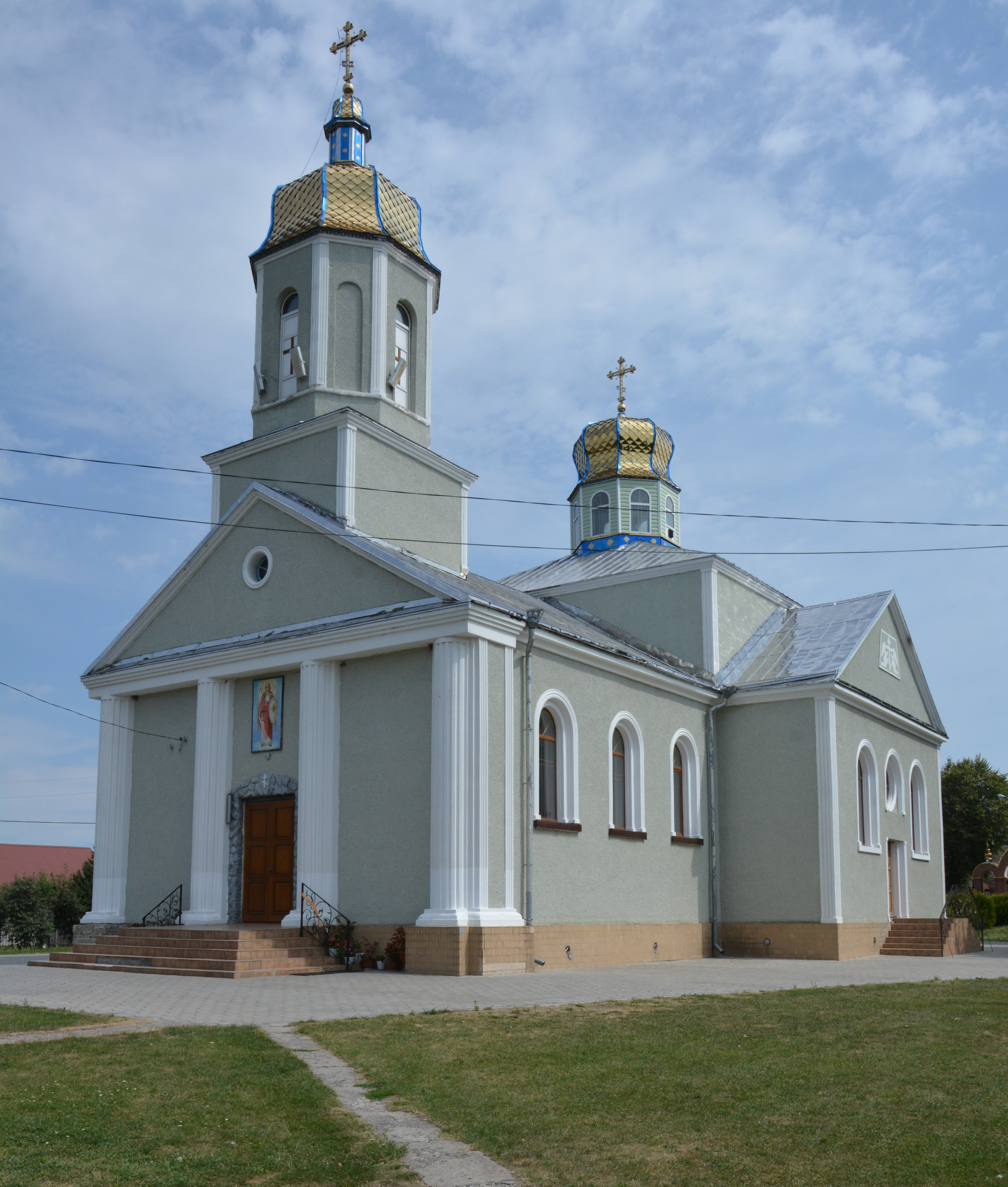
St. Michael Church (entrance view)

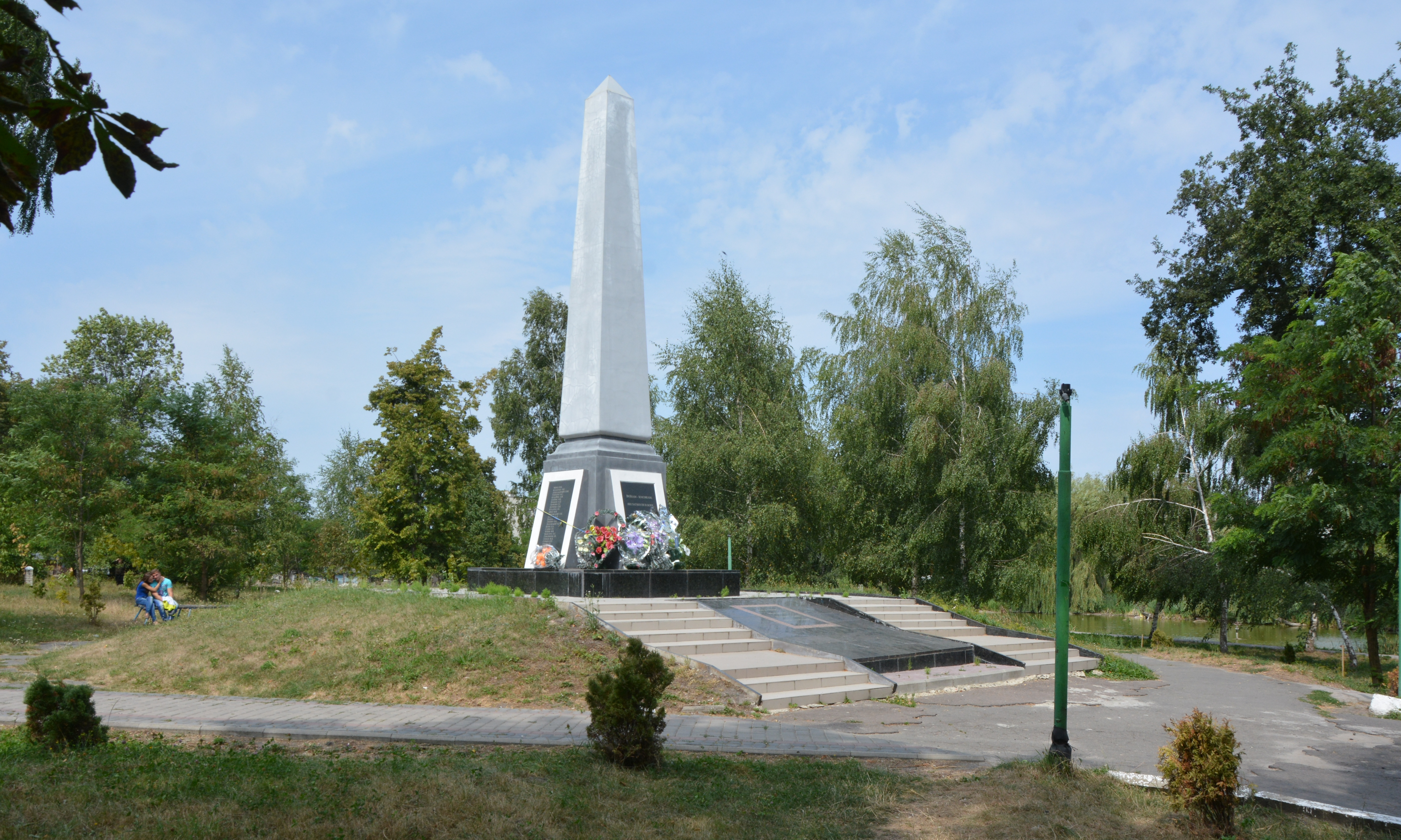
World War II Memorial
