= Bofon =

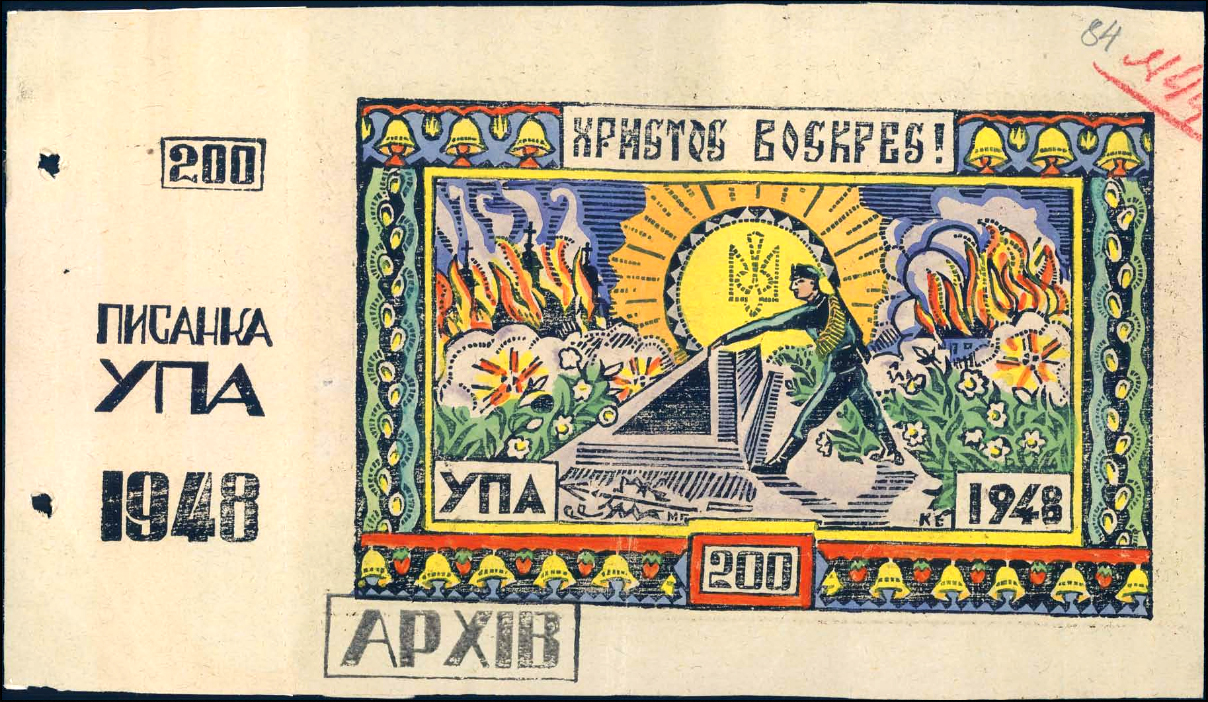
Bofon with a face value of 200 Karbovanets

Bofons (short for "battle fund", Ukrainian: бойовий фонд) - one-sided (rarely two-sided) monetary documents (receipts) issued by the Ukrainian nationalist organizations Organization of Ukrainian Nationalists (OUN) and Ukrainian Insurgent Army (UPA) in their insurgency against the Soviet Union during and after World War II. They carried national symbols and symbols of the OUN and UPA and corresponding inscriptions (or only with symbols, without inscriptions), with fixed denominations or without denominations. Authorized persons on behalf of the OUN or UPA issued them to the population for voluntarily contributed, collected as a contingent, requisitioned funds, in the form of cash, sometimes food, clothing, etc. In addition to their purely financial role, bofons also served an agitational function, so they were used in insurgent propaganda work.

In different periods of the OUN's activity, the fund was called "combat", "liberation", "revolutionary", "national", "military" and even "operational" for strategic and tactical reasons. Despite this diversity, the term "war fund" gained the greatest popularity, probably because it was used more often. Over time, there was a reduction, the vowel sound "o" changed to "i" or to "e", "y", depending on the location. As a result, in Galicia and Bukovina, OUN monetary documents came to be called "befones" and "bifons", and in Volyn (Rivne, Volyn, Zhytomyr regions) and Belarusian Polissya - "bifons". In addition, these language varieties quickly migrated to insurgent documents and literature of underground authors, and thus to the publications of the Ukrainian diaspora.

Individual banknotes were reprinted in OUN detachments on the periphery, where craftsmen cut clichés on pear and ash plates for serial issues of money. Famous Christmas series of bofons, which depicted the dreams and hopes of the Ukrainian insurgents. Banknote 10 depicts the Kremlin Wall, to which Ukrainian soldiers are running across the square with scythes and swords in their hands, some have climbed the tower, tore off the top with a star and are trying to establish the Ukrainian national flag.

In the Easter series, there is hope that Ukraine will be an independent state, as evidenced by the inscriptions: "Christ is Risen! Ukraine will rise! The will of the people! The will of man! Death to tyrants! ”

In total, between 1939 and 1954, about 500 varieties of bofon were released, which were in use in at least 12 regions of Ukraine and Belarus, as well as partly in Austria, Germany, Poland, Slovakia, and the Czech Republic.

== The most famous series ==
Among the most famous series of bofons:

- In Galicia, where the Krakow zlotys circulated, there are known serial issues of 5, 10, 20, 50 zlotys, decorated with geometric ornaments depicting the cross and a stylized symbol of the unity of the city and the village - a gear wheel and an ear of wheat. One of the signs bears the denomination "1 m" - "stamp".
- Between 1944 and 1946, the OUN issued money to provide for the army. Bofons played a significant role as a way to replenish the budget. Series 4, 6 and 7 denominations were issued without the name of the currency.
- One of the most famous series was called "Volyn Series" - an issue of the OUN command in 1945-1946. There were denominations of 5, 10, 20, 50, 100, 300, 500 and 1000 karbovanets. The sketch of the signs was made by the famous graphic artist Nil Khasevych. The large number of denominations and the desire to give them the appearance of "real" money suggest that there was probably a plan to make them all-Ukrainian currency.

== Current use ==
In 2008, bofons with images of OUN figures were printed for use on the territory of Kuznya Unizh.

== See also ==
- History of Ukrainian hryvnia

== Sources ==
- Грошові документи ОУН-УПА в Галузевому державному архіві Служби безпеки України (13.10.2006)
- Грошові знаки ОУН-УПА (Персонал плюс, № 33 (236), 29 серпня — 4 вересня 2007)
- Художник із бункерів УПА
- Бофони: грошові документи ОУН і УПА / Авт.-упоряд. О. О. Клименко; За ред. В. М. Даниленка. — К.: Університет банківської справи Національного банку України, 2008. — 192 с., іл. ISBN 978-966-484-041-2
- Гроші УПА — графічні шедеври Ніла Хасевича.
