= Kivertsi =

City in Volyn Oblast, Ukraine

Kivertsi Ківерці
- City
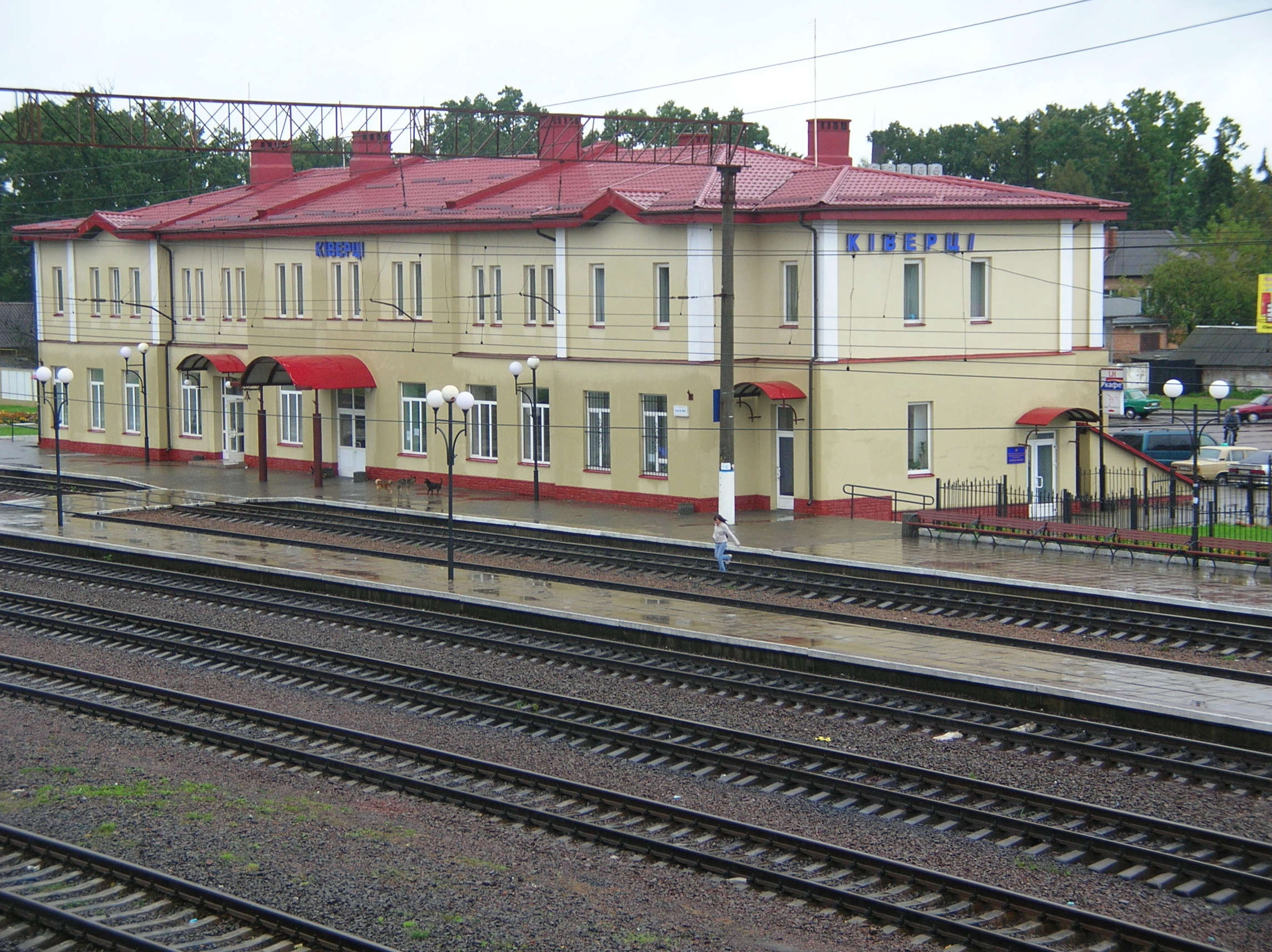
- Kivertsi railway station

- Flag Coat of arms

- Location within Volyn Oblast Location within Ukraine
- Coordinates: 50°49′59″N 25°27′41″E
- Country: Ukraine
- Oblast: Volyn Oblast
- Raion: Lutsk Raion
- Hromada: Kivertsi urban hromada

Government
  - Mayor: Kovalchuk Oleksandr
- Elevation: 194 m (636 ft)

Population (2022)
  - Total: 13,798
- Website: http://www.kivrada.gov.ua/

Kivertsi (Ukrainian: Ківерці, IPA: [ˈkiwerts⁽ʲ⁾i]; Polish: Kiwerce) is a city in Volyn Oblast, in north-western Ukraine. It is the administrative center of Kivertsi urban hromada. Total area is 848,200 ha. Population is 13,798 (2022 estimate).

It is located in the historic region of Volhynia, 12 km northeast from the city of Lutsk, the regional center.

The city has 3 artificial reservoirs (lake Molodizhne, with the area of 1.25 hectares, and two little lakes with an area of 1 ha each), the Prudnik River is passing through. On all sides, the city is surrounded by forests. Within the city, there is 171.7 hectares of forested land.

== Emblem ==
The Emblem of Kivertsi – a square divided horizontally into two parts. On the upper side of the white part there's a running red squirrel, the lower side is divided into three vertical stripes of equal width – green, yellow and green.

== Origin of the name ==
Historians associate the name Kivertsi with the name of an ancient tribe called Tivertsi that lived on the banks of the Dniester River at the mouth of the Danube. At the end of the 11th and the beginning of the 12th century under the pressure of neighbour nomadic tribes Tivertsi moved north. Divided into smaller groups the tribe has spread and settled in Volyn. Over time, the name mutated into Kivertsi and was assigned to the place of settlement of the tribe.

== History ==
Kivertsi is a relatively young city, it is a little more than 130 years. Although the first settlements in this area appeared much earlier, as evidenced by the treasure of Roman coins from II-III BC, found here in 1700.

Kivertsi town owes its appearance on the map to the development of railway construction, which intensified after the abolition of serfdom in Russia in 1861.

In the 1870-1873 between the cities of Rivne and Kovel a railway track was laid, and 7 km from the village Kivertsi (now Prylutske) was built a station with the same name. In 1890, the War Department of the Russian Empire paved the railroad through Kivertsi to Lutsk, and then – to Lviv and Radehov, a border state with Austria-Hungary at that time. The town became an important railway junction.

During World War I, in March 1918, residents strongly opposed the Austro-Hungarian occupation. In May 1919 Kivertsi was captured by Poland. In July 1920 the city was occupied by the Red Army, but according to the Treaty of Riga of 1921 the settlement became a part of Poland, within which it was administratively located in the Wołyń Voivodeship.

Following the joint German-Soviet invasion of Poland, which started World War II in September 1939, it was occupied by the Soviet Union and incorporated by the Ukrainian Soviet Socialist Republic. In July 1941 German troops captured Kivertsi. In February 1944 Kivertsi was recaptured by the Soviets, and eventually annexed from Poland the following year.

A local newspaper is published here since January 1945.

Town since June 1951

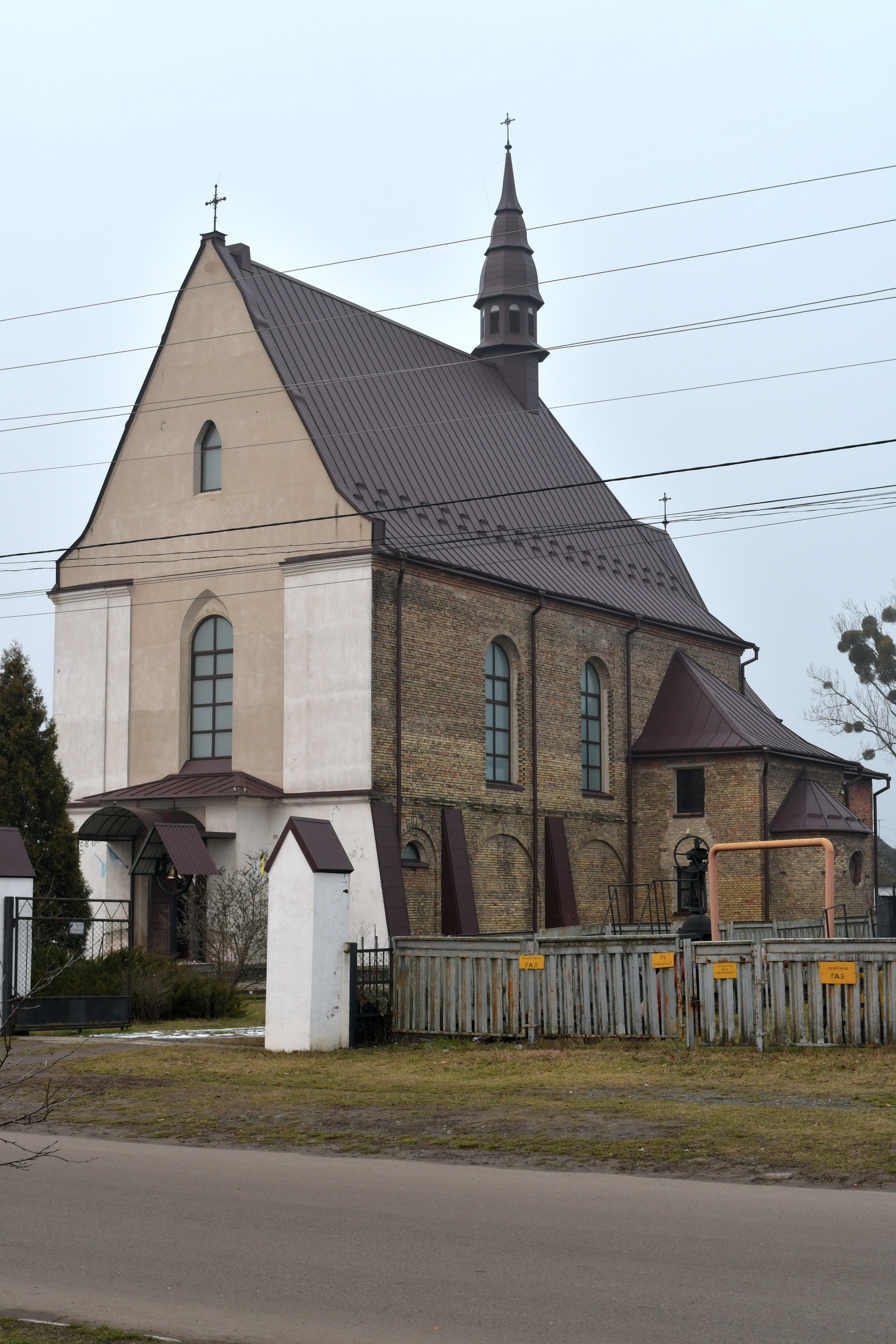
Catholic Church of the Sacred Heart of Jesus

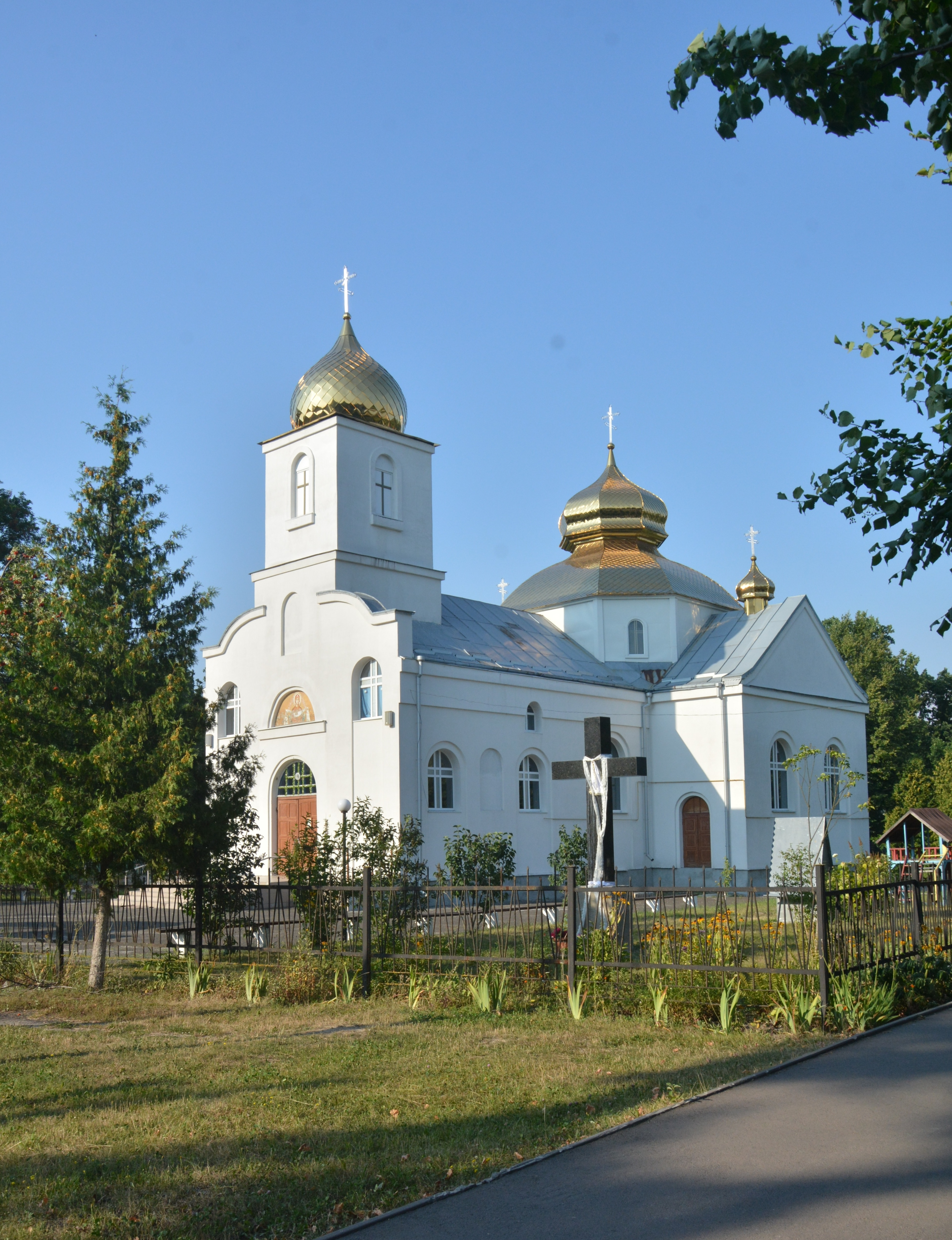
Orthodox Church of the Intercession, Kyiv Patriarchate

In January 1989 the population was 16 722 people.

== Economy and infrastructure ==
Kivertsi is an important railway junction, as well as a centre of wood processing, furniture production, mechanical industry and peat extraction.

Numerous institutions of trade, public catering, consumer services, Kivertsi's city stadium, park, playground with artificial turf play significant role in Kivertsi's infrastructure.

== Demographics ==
As of the 2001 Ukrainian census, Kivertsi had a population of 16,505 inhabitants. The ethnic and linguitic composition of the population was as follows:

Ethnic groups in Kivertsi
	percent
Ukrainians	96.49%
Russians	2.81%
Belarusians	0.21%
Poles	0.12%
Moldovans	0.07%
others	0.30%

Native languages in Kivertsi
	percent
Ukrainian	97.0%
Russian	2.7%
Belarusian	0.1%
others	0.2%

== Culture ==
=== Events and celebrations taking place in Kivertsi ===
- Independence Day – 24 August
- National Flag Day – 23 August
- Day of Kivertsi – 9 September
- Youth Day – the last Sunday of May
- International Children's Day – 1 June
- Victory Day – 9 May
- Holodomor (The Great Famine) Remembrance Day – November 28
- "Farewell winter, spring meeting"
