= Lutsk Raion =

Subdivision of Volyn Oblast, Ukraine

Lutsk Raion Луцький район
- Raion
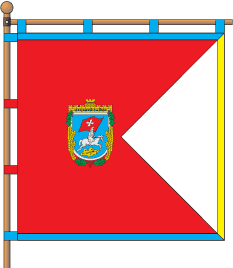
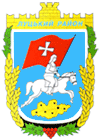
- Flag Coat of arms

- Interactive map of Lutsk Raion
- Coordinates: 50°48′00″N 25°18′00″E
- Country: Ukraine
- Oblast: Volyn Oblast
- Established: 1966
- Admin. center: Lutsk
- Subdivisions: 15 hromadas

Area
  - Total: 5,247.8 km^{2} (2,026.2 sq mi)

Population (2022)
  - Total: 455,439
  - Density: 86.787/km^{2} (224.78/sq mi)
- Time zone: UTC+02:00 (EET)
  - Summer (DST): UTC+03:00 (EEST)
- Area code: 380-3322
- Website: http://www.lutskadm.gov.ua/ Lutskyi Raion

Lutsk Raion (Ukrainian: Луцький район) is a raion (district) in Volyn Oblast in western Ukraine. Its administrative center is the city of Lutsk. Population: 457 287 (2022)

On 18 July 2020, as part of the administrative reform of Ukraine, the number of raions of Volyn Oblast was reduced to four, and the area of Lutsk Raion was significantly expanded.

== Geography ==
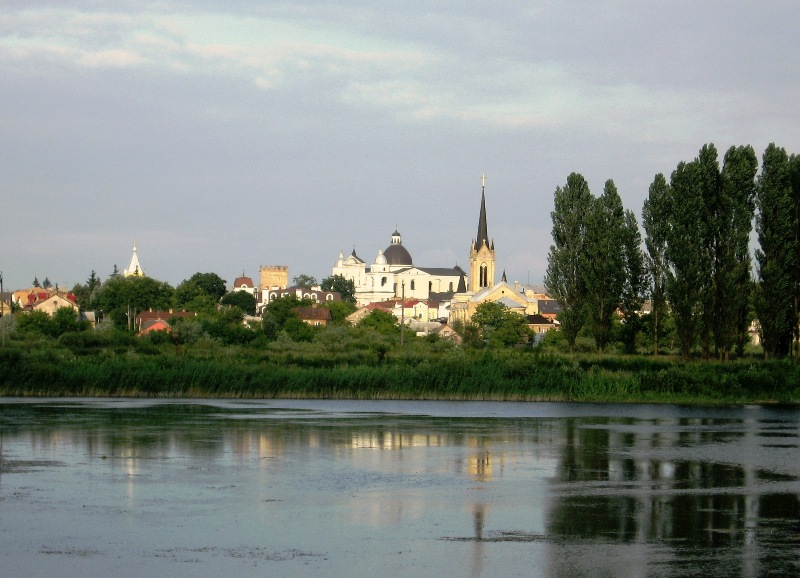
Lutsk old town and the Styr

The area of the district is 5249.1 km^{2}, which is 4.8% of the territory of the Volyn region.

The district borders the Volodymyr, Kamen-Kashyrskyi, and Kovelskyi districts of the Volyn Oblast, as well as the Lviv Oblast and Rivne Oblast of Ukraine. The larger area of the district is located in the Volhynian Upland . The area of the area is located in the area of mixed forests and the river basin Styr (tributary of the Pripyat). The climate is moderately continental with mild winters (in January -4.4 °, -5.1 °) and warm wet summer (in July +18.8 °). Rainfall 550-640 mm per year.

== Communities of the district ==
Number of settlements 351. Number of cities – 12. The district includes 15 territorial communities. Urban communities are formed around the cities of Berestechko, Horokhiv, Kivertsi, Lutsk, Olyka, Rozhyshche. 9 rural communities with centers in the village of Kolky, the village of Maryanivka, the village of Torchyn, the village of Tsuman, the village of Boratyn, the village of Horodyshche, the village of Dorosyni, the village of Kopachivka, the village of Pidhaitsi.

== Economy of the district ==
The district grows grain and industrial crops, mainly wheat, rapeseed, and sugar beet.In the area, the largest industrial center of Lutsk, which has food, woodworking and light industry. The city also operates in the Bogdan Motors Automobile Company.

== Transport ==
The national highways of Ukraine pass through Lutsk district: H-17, connecting the city of Rivne with the Polish-Ukrainian border, and H-22, the route Ustylug - Lutsk - Rivne. The international highway M-19 from Romania to the border with Belarus (Domanovo) also passes through Lutsk. Railways through the district run to Lviv and Kyiv. The largest railway stations in the district are Kivertsi and Lutsk.

== See also ==
- Administrative divisions of Volyn Oblast
- Korshiv, a village in Lutsk Raion
