= Shatsk =

Shatsk may refer to:

- Shatsk, Belarus, an agrotown in Minsk Region, Belarus
- Shatsk, Russia, a town in Ryazan Oblast, Russia
- Shatsk, Ukraine, a rural settlement in Volyn Oblast, Ukraine
- Shatsk National Natural Park

== See also ==
- Shatsky (disambiguation)
