= Shatsky =

Shatsky (masculine, Cyrillic: Шацкий), Shatskaya (feminine, Cyrillic: Шацкая), or Shatskoye (neuter, Cyrillic: Шацкое) may refer to:

- Shatsky (surname)
- Shatskiy Hill in Antarctica
- Shatsky District in Ryazan Oblast, Russia
- Shatskyi Lakes in Ukraine
- Shatsky Rise, a plateau in the north-west Pacific Ocean
- Shatskoye Urban Settlement, a municipal formation which the town of district significance of Shatsk in Shatsky District of Ryazan Oblast, Russia is incorporated as
- Shatsk Raion (Shatsky District), a district of Volyn Oblast, Ukraine
- Shatskaya (rural locality), a rural locality (a sloboda) in Sapozhkovsky District of Ryazan Oblast, Russia

== See also ==
- Richard Schatzki
- Olivier Schatzky
