= Shatsky Lakes =

Group of fresh water lakes located in northern Ukraine

Shatsk Lakes
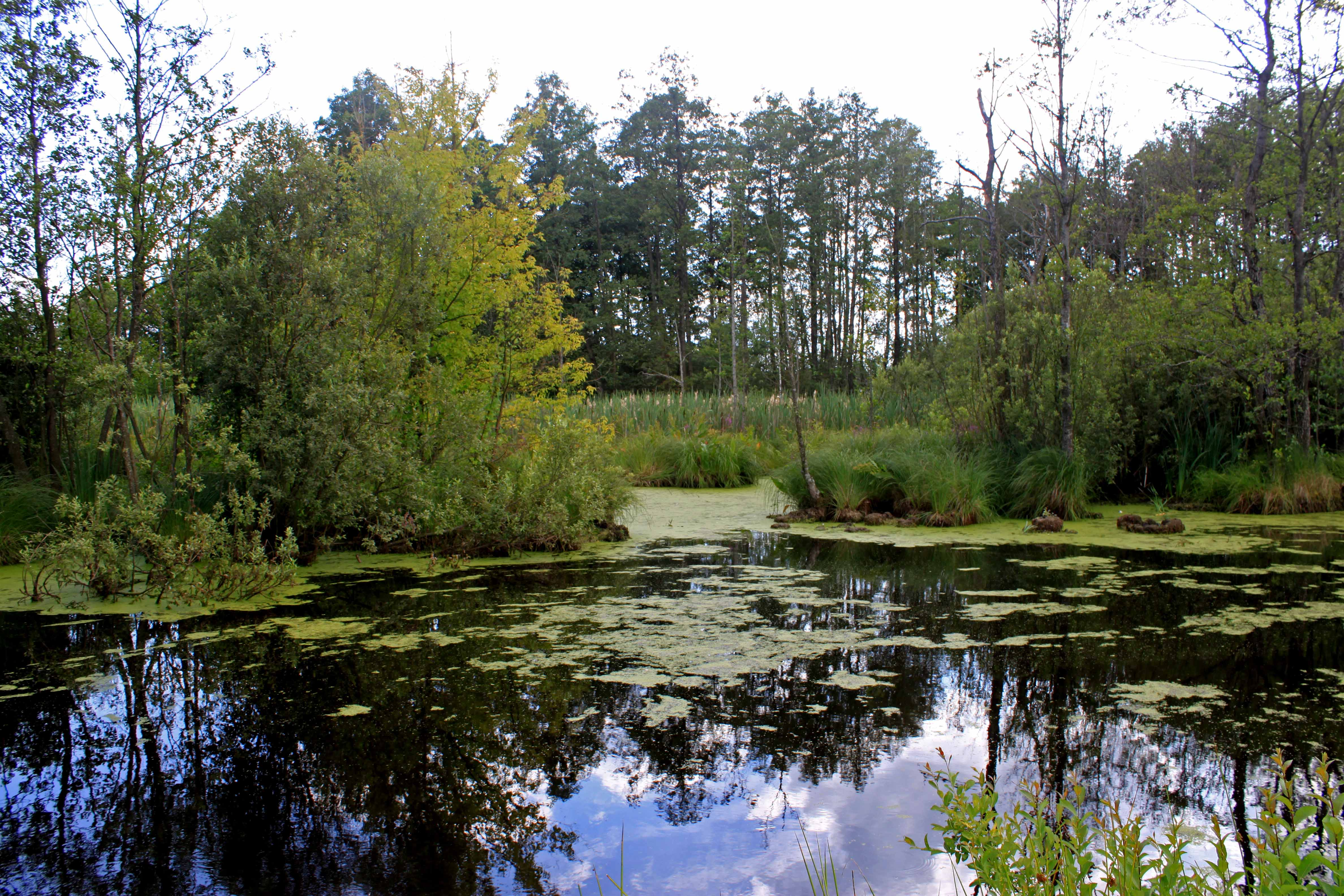

- Location within Volyn Oblast Location within Ukraine
- Interactive map of Shatsk Lakes
- Location: Northern Ukraine
- Coordinates: 51°30′N 23°50′E
- Basin countries: Ukraine, Belarus, and Poland
- Settlements: Shatsk

Ramsar Wetland
- Official name: Shatsk Lakes
- Designated: 23 November 1995
- Reference no.: 775

The Shatsk Lakes (plural, Ukrainian: Шацькі озера, romanized: Shatski ozera) is a group of fresh water lakes located in the north-west of Ukraine near the borders with Belarus and Poland, in the basin of the Bug river. The Shatsk Lakes are known for their clean, pure waters and views of the surrounding forests. The Shatsk Lakes are located in the Shatsk National Natural Park. The largest lake is Svitiaz.

== Geographic characteristics ==
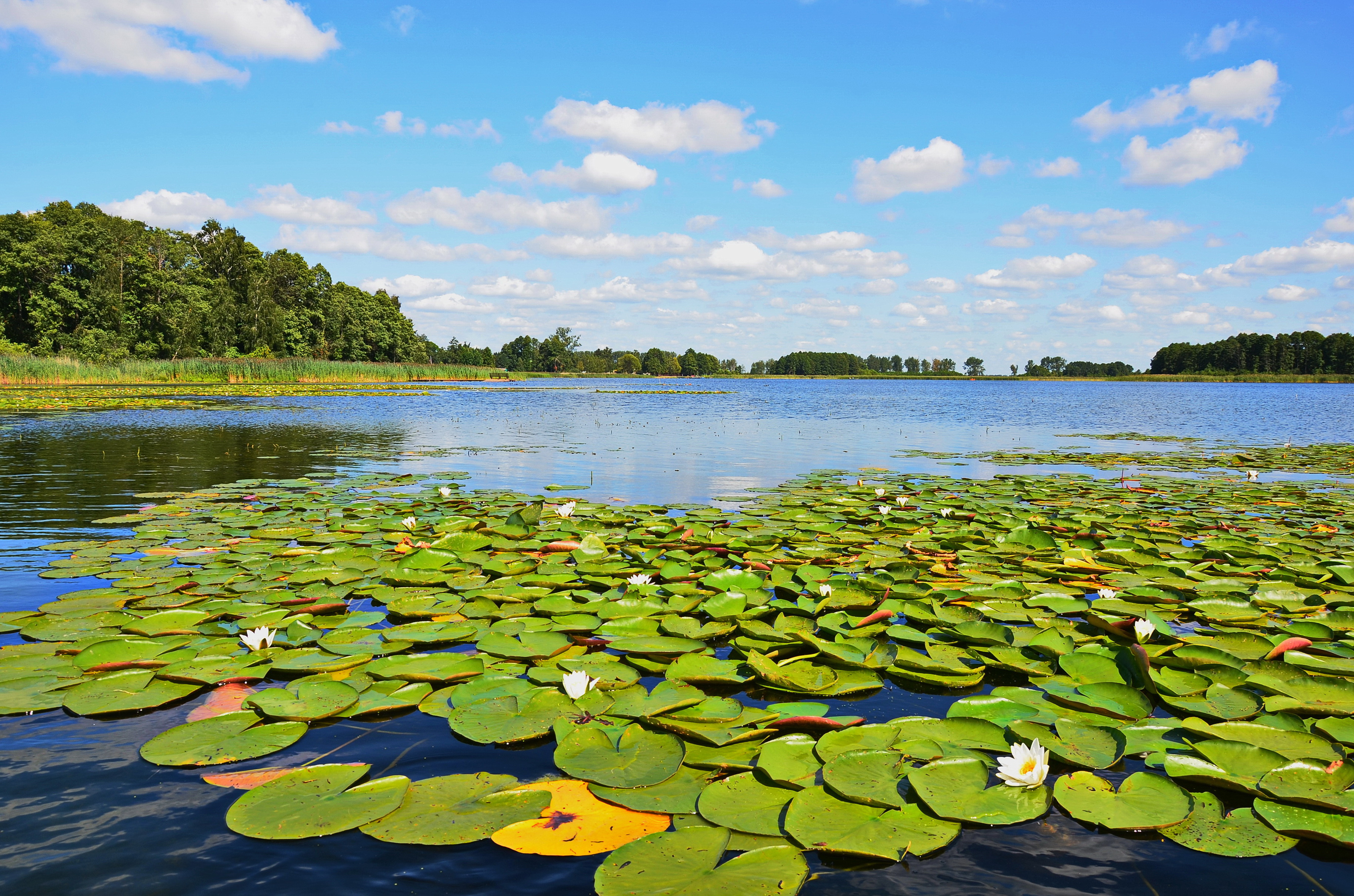
The Shatsk lakes

The Shatsk Lakes in the Kovel Raion of the Volyn region. The Shatsk lakes is located on the left bank of the Western Bug (Vistula basin). The lakes is located in the Polesian Lowland, among the pine forests of Volyn Polissya.

The territory around the lakes has a landscape of alluvial-outwash lowlands with sod-podzolic soils. In the area of the Shatsk lakes, there are Quaternary lake-swamp deposits of the Holocene: silt, sapropel, peat.

The Shatsk lakes is located in a temperate climatic zone with an average annual air temperature of 8°C, the average temperature in June is 19°C, in January ― -5°C , the average amount of precipitation is more than 600 mm.

Lakes is fed by groundwater of the Cretaceous horizon, atmospheric precipitation and surface runoff.

The largest of the Shatsk lakes are:

- Svityaz (area 27.5 km²),
- Pulemetske Lake (area 16.3 km²),
- Luky (lake) (area 6.8 km²),
- Lyutsymyr (area 4.3 km²),
- Ostrovyanske Lake (area 2.5 km²),
- Krymne (area 1.44 km²),
- Pisochne Lake (area 1.86 km²).

== Flora and fauna ==
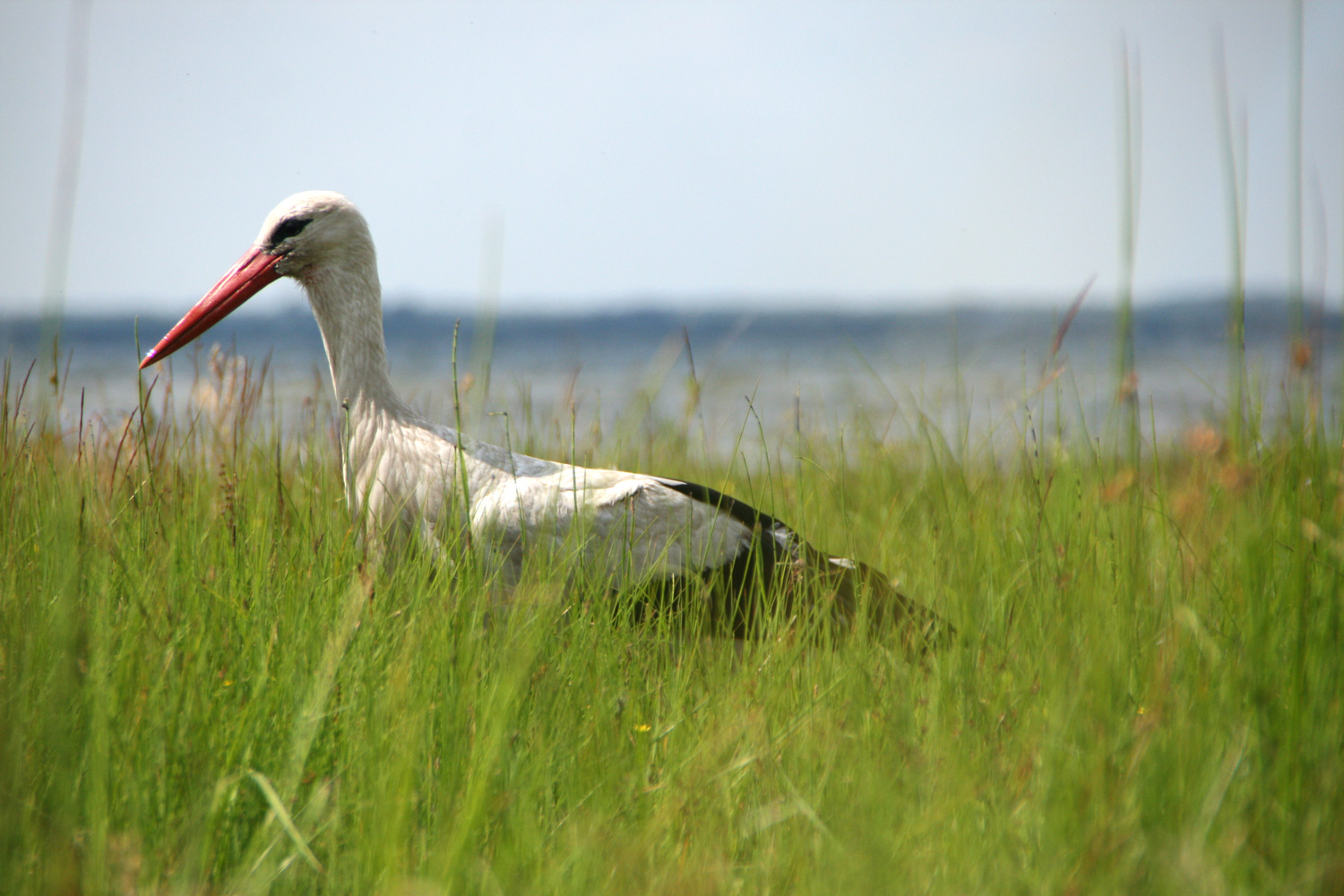
White stork of Lake Svityaz

The phytoplankton of lakes is most represented by desmid and desmid algae. Among the aquatic vegetation phragmites australis, typha latifolia, carex lasiocarpa, white waterlily, canadian elodea are common. The lake is home to eel, bream, carp, catfish, crucian carp, and coregonus.

Shatsk National Nature Park, which includes Shatsk lakes, was established by Resolution of the Council of Ministers of the Ukrainian SSR dated December 28, 1983 No. 533.

== Tourism ==
The only transport to the lakes is by car. The main access road Kovel - Lyuboml - Berestya (Belarus), which runs through Shatsky Park from south to north, allows access to the recreational areas of the lakes.

A recreation infrastructure is being developed on the basis of Shatsky Lakes: tourist complexes, boarding houses, cottages have been built, roads have been laid, catering establishments have been equipped, etc. The shallow coastal zone of the lakes warms up better in the warm season, and the sandy beaches and clear water create conditions for recreational tourism, especially for children.

Fish farming and fishing are developed on the lakes.

An ecological trail "Svityazyanka" has been created in the Shatsk National Nature Park, which runs along the southern shore of the lake Svityaz.

== See also ==
- Lake Yalpuh
- Synevyr

== Bibliography ==
- Національний атлас України/НАН України, Інститут географії, Державна служба геодезії, картографії та кадастру; голов. ред. Л. Г. Руденко; голова ред. кол.Б.Є. Патон. — К.: ДНВП «Картографія», 2007. — 435 с. — 5 тис.прим. — ISBN 978-966-475-067-4.
