= West Polesia Transboundary Biosphere Reserve =

Nature reserve located in Poland, Ukraine, and Belarus

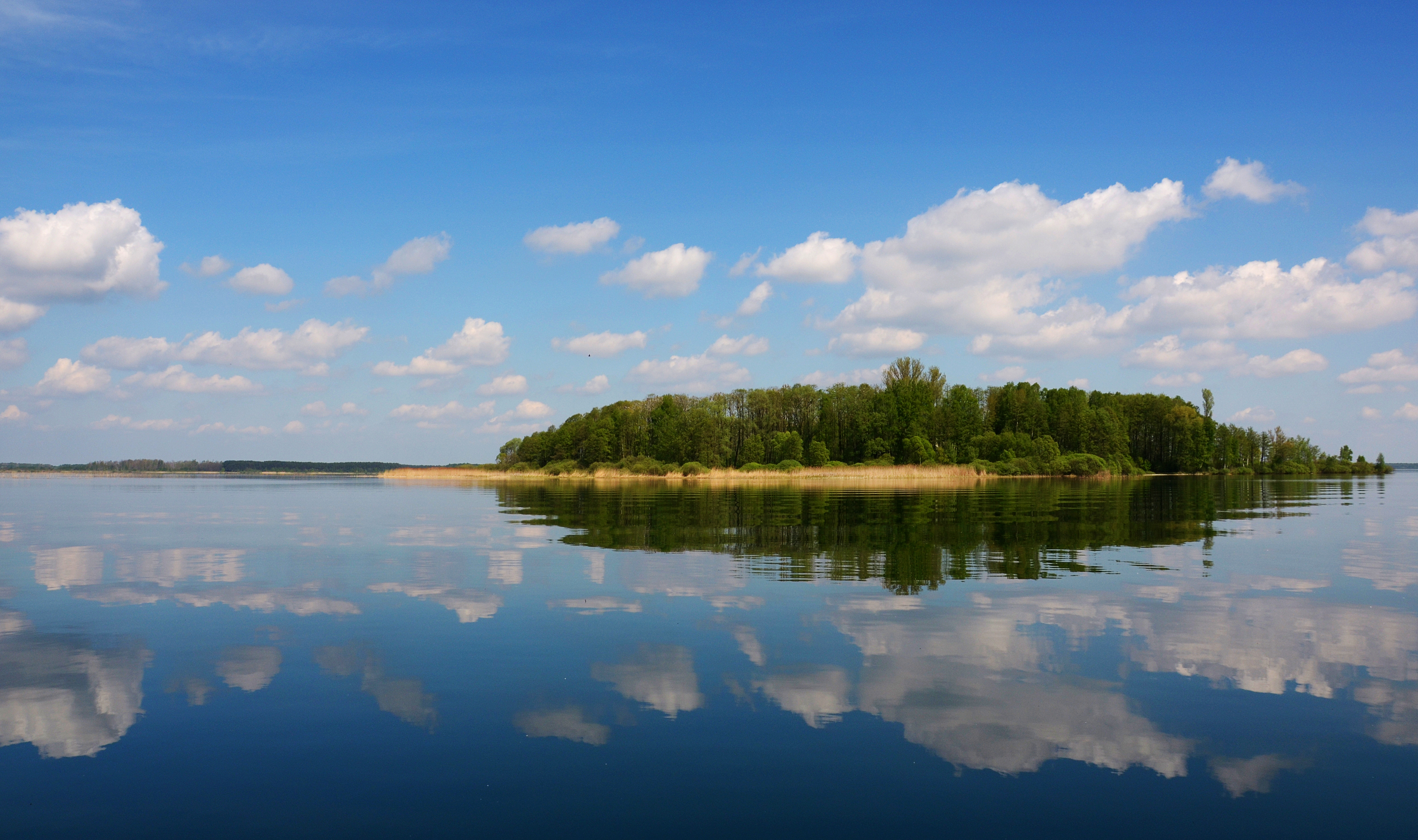
- View of Lake Svytiaz in the Ukrainian area of the reserve

- Location within Ukraine
- Location: Poland, Ukraine, Belarus
- Coordinates: 51°30′28″N 23°37′09″E
- Area: 263,016 hectares (649,930 acres)
- Designated: 2012

The West Polesia Transboundary Biosphere Reserve (Ukrainian: Західне Полісся; Russian: Западное Полесье) is a transboundary nature reserve in Polesia, located in Poland, Ukraine, and Belarus. It is designated as an area of global importance under UNESCO's World Network of Biosphere Reserves under their Programme on Man and the Biosphere.

The reserve was established in 2012 when the Shatskiy Biosphere Reserve in Ukraine, Polesian National Park in Poland, and Pribuzhskoye Polesia Biosphere Reserve in Belarus were combined to create a UNESCO-certified biosphere reserve. The former Shatskiy Biosphere Reserve, established by UNESCO in 2002, was absorbed into this new reserve and renamed.

The region's administrative offices are located in the Polesian National Park in Poland, the Shatskyi National Nature Park in Ukraine, and the Pribuzskoye Polesia in Belarus.

== History ==
In 1983, the Shatsk National Nature Park was established to protect rare natural complexes in the Shatsk Lakes region. The national park contained 48,977 hectares of area, and in 2002, it was used as a basis to create the Shatskiy Biosphere Reserve, designated by UNESCO.

In 1990, in Poland, the Polesia National Park was created to preserve wetland forests, meadows and non-forested peatlands. On the Belarus side, by 2004, the Pribuzhskoe Polesia biosphere reserve was established.

In 2011, the governments of Belarus, Poland and Ukraine signed an agreement to use areas from each country to create a transboundary nature reserve. The previously established Shatskiy Biosphere Reserve in Ukraine, Polesia National Park in Poland, and Pribuzhskoye Polesie Biosphere Reserve in the Brest Oblast of Belarus were used as the basis to form the West Polesia Biosphere Reserve.

All three countries applied to include the reserve in UNESCO's World Network of Biosphere Reserves. During the 24th session of the UNESCO's International Coordinating Council for their Man and the Biosphere Programme, they considered and approved the reserve's application. In 2012, the West Polesia Transboundary Biosphere Reserve was officially certified as a part of the World Network of Biosphere Reserves.

== Geography ==
The reserve covers an area of 263,016 hectares: 139,917 hectares of the area are in Poland, 75,075 hectares are in Ukraine, and 48,024 hectares are in Belarus. It includes a core area, as well as a buffer and transition zone which make up a majority of the reserve. According to the Krugloye government, it is the "biggest protected natural reserve in the Central European Biogeographical Region."

The region contains more than 100 lakes, including 62 in Poland, 28 in Ukraine, and more than 20 in Belarus. There are both boreal coniferous forests and temperate zone deciduous forests on the reserve, as well as marshes, meadows, swamps, and peat bogs.

The Polish Łęczna Lakeland Landscape Park and Sobibór Landscape Park are located on the reserve. The railway line from Brest, Belarus to Włodawa, Poland runs through the region's forests. The reserve's administrative offices are located in the Poleski National Park in Poland, the Shatskyi National Nature Park in Ukraine, and the Pribuzskoye Polesia in Belarus.

== Flora and fauna ==
The reserve is home to endangered species identified by Poland, Belarus and Ukraine, as well as internationally designated endangered species, including the Aquatic warbler (Acrocephalus paludicola) bird. The Marsh Sandpiper (Tringa stagnatilis) and Eurasian crane (Grus grus) species of birds also use the area as a breeding ground.

The region covers important migratory pathways for birds, including a north–south pathway from the White Sea to the Baltic Sea to the Mediterranean Sea, and east–west migration. The plant species Atocion armeria and Festuca polessica are native to the area.

== Population and culture ==
As of 2019, there are an estimated 68,000 people that live within the reservation's buffer and transition zones. Culturally, the area mixes both eastern and western European influences. The economy is mainly driven by agriculture, forestry, fishing, tourism and recreation. The reserve also hosts wooden architecture and buildings that are traditional to the Polesia region.
