= Svitiaz =

Lake in Volyn Oblast, Ukraine

Coordinates: 51°30′N 23°46′E

- Світязь (Ukrainian); Свіцязь (Belarusian); Świtaź (Polish); Свитязь (Russian)
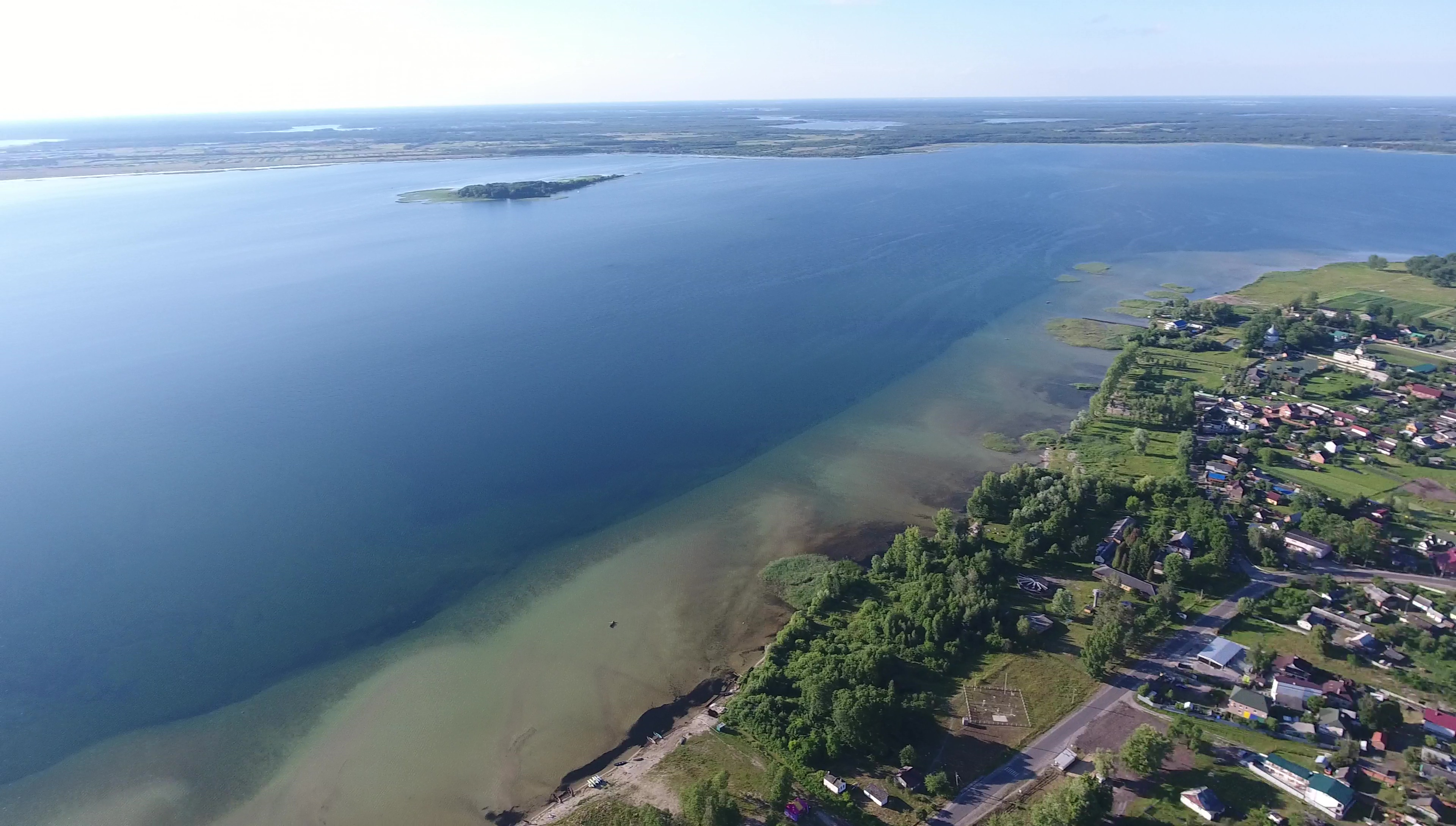

- Location within Ukraine Location within Volyn Oblast
- Location: Shatsk National Natural Park, Kovel Raion, Volyn Oblast
- Group: Shatsky Lakes
- Basin countries: Ukraine
- Max. length: 9.3 km (5.8 mi)
- Max. width: 8 km (5.0 mi)
- Surface area: 25.2 km^{2} (9.7 sq mi)
- Average depth: 6.9 m (23 ft)
- Max. depth: 58.4 m (192 ft)
- Water volume: 180×10^{6} m^{3} (150,000 acre⋅ft)
- Islands: 1 (7 ha or 17 acres)

Svitiaz (Ukrainian: Світязь [ˈs⁽ʲ⁾witʲɐzʲ]; Belarusian: Свіцязь; Polish: Świtaź; Russian: Свитязь) is a freshwater lake located in Ukraine, in the Volyn Oblast. It is the deepest lake in Ukraine. Svityaz has a maximum depth of 58.4 meters and an area of 25.2 km^{2}.

The lake was created through karst processes in the Chalk rocks of the Mesozoic era. The lake is one of the Shatsk Lakes group, which are located in the Shatsk National Natural Park.

The lake is located among the pine forests of Volyn Polissya. The lake is located in a temperate climatic zone with warm summers and cold winters. In summer, the water temperature of the lake warms up to more than 20C, in cold winters the lake freezes.

The water quality in Lake Svityaz is high, the water does not have harmful chemical elements.

Svityaz is a popular place for recreational tourism, especially for children.

== Description ==
Lake Svityaz is located in the Kovel Raion of the Volyn region in the north-west of Ukraine, near the border of Poland and Belarus.

The lake is 9.3 km long, with a maximum width of 4.8 km. The area of the water mirror is 27.k km², the volume is 0.180 km³. The coastline is over 30 km long, the beach area is well defined, the width of the sandy beaches ranges from 5 to 60 m. The maximum depth is 58.4 m, the average depth is 6.3 meters. The water mirror edge is located at 163 m above sea level. The lake has two bays: Luka and Buzhnya (maximum depth 4.3 m).

The lake, like all Shatsk lakes, is located on the left bank of the Western Bug (Vistula basin). Svityaz is a sewage lake, through a channel the water from it enters Lake Luky, and then to the tributaries of the Western Bug.

The lake is located in the Polesian Lowland, among the pine forests of Volyn Polissya. The territory around the lake has a landscape of alluvial-outwash lowlands with sod-podzolic soils. In the area of the lake, there are Quaternary lake-swamp deposits of the Holocene: silt, sapropel, peat.

Svytyaz is located in a temperate climatic zone with an average annual air temperature of 8°C, the average temperature in June is 19°C, in January ― -5°C , the average amount of precipitation is more than 600 mm. In the summer, the water can warm up to 23°C (surface layer), a sharp change in water temperature is observed from depths of more than 3 m.

Lake Svityaz is fed by groundwater of the Cretaceous horizon, atmospheric precipitation and surface runoff, the area of which is not large, namely 43.6 sq. km.

The nearest settlements are Svityaz and Shatsk.

=== Lake basin ===
The lake basin was created by karst and glacial processes. The relief of the lake basin is complex, there are shoals, depressions of various depths and karst funnels. Bathymetric studies of Lake Svityaz have shown that the bottom has several karst funnels with depths of 38 m, 37 m, 32 m, 20 m, 17 m, 15 m and 14 m. The lake is considered deep, although the coastal zone has shallow water. The lake has a deep-water northwestern part and a shallow eastern part. Almost in the middle of the lake there is an island with an area of 7 hectares.

=== Water quality ===
In Lake Svityaz, the water is of high quality: hydrocarbonate-calcium with a slightly alkaline pH, soft, clean, rich in silver ions and glycerin. The lake has a high transparency from 3 to 5.4 m, sometimes it can reach a depth of up to 8 m. There are no economic enterprises around the lake, it is located in a nature conservation area, so pollution is minimal, and for some chemical elements it is completely absent.

== Flora and fauna ==
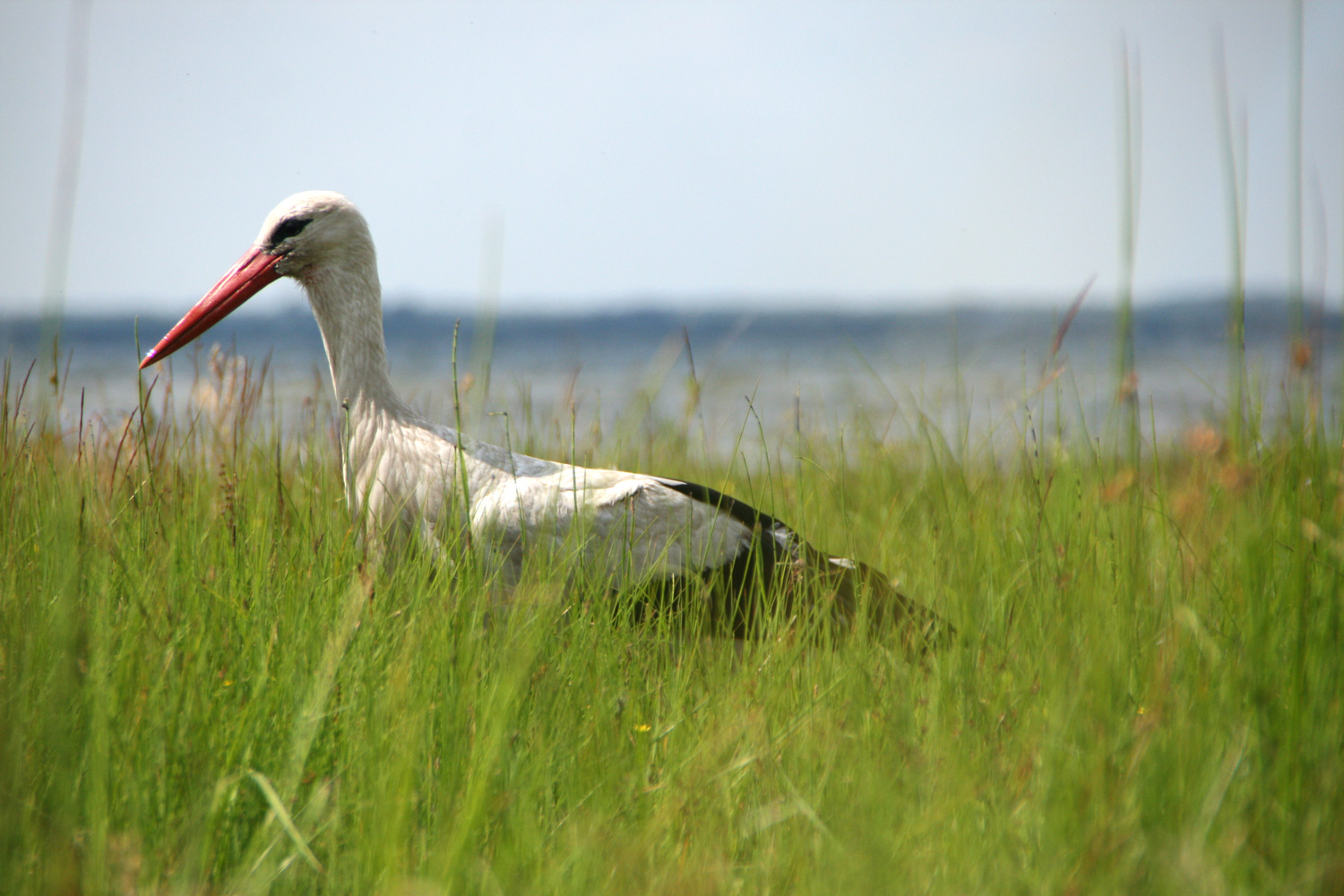
White stork of Lake Svityaz

The phytoplankton of Lake Svityaz has 40 species of algae, with the greatest diversity being desmid and desmid algae. Among the aquatic vegetation along the coast, phragmites australis, typha latifolia, carex lasiocarpa, white waterlily, canadian elodea are common. The lake is home to eel, bream, carp, catfish, crucian carp, and coregonus.

Shatsk National Nature Park, which includes Lake Svityaz, was established by Resolution of the Council of Ministers of the Ukrainian SSR dated December 28, 1983 No. 533.

== Tourism ==
The only transport to the lake is by car. The main access road Kovel - Lyuboml - Berestya (Belarus), which runs through Shatsky Park from south to north, allows access to the recreational areas around the lake.

A recreation infrastructure is being developed on the basis of Shatsky Lakes: tourist complexes, boarding houses, cottages have been built, roads have been laid, catering establishments have been equipped, etc. The shallow coastal zone of the lake warms up better in the warm season, and the sandy beaches and clear water create conditions for recreational tourism, especially for children.

Fish farming and fishing are developed on the lake.

An ecological trail "Svityazyanka" has been created in the Shatsk National Nature Park, which runs along the southern shore of the lake.

=== The Svityaz Donut Festival ===
The Svityaz Donut Festival has been held on the shores of Lake Svityaz since 2018. At the festival, you could taste the local authentic pastry "Svityaz Donut" with various fillings. Also, during the festival, performances by folklore groups and individual performers, exhibitions were held. The Svityaz Donut was included in the regional list of elements of intangible heritage of the Volyn region in 2024.

== Ecology ==
Anthropogenic load during the tourist season has a strong impact on the ecology of Sitiazy, because the tourist infrastructure around the lake is overloaded, and some buildings do not meet sanitary and recreational standards. Garbage dumps, construction in coastal areas, the arrival of vehicles and their washing near the lake are problems that have not yet been solved. The main sources of pollution of surface and groundwater have now become municipal waste from residents of neighboring settlements and tourists.

The growth of economic activity of the Khotislavsky sand-chalk deposit (Belarus), located near Lake Svityaz, may cause an environmental problem, namely a decrease in the water level in the Shatskie Lakes.

== Gallery ==
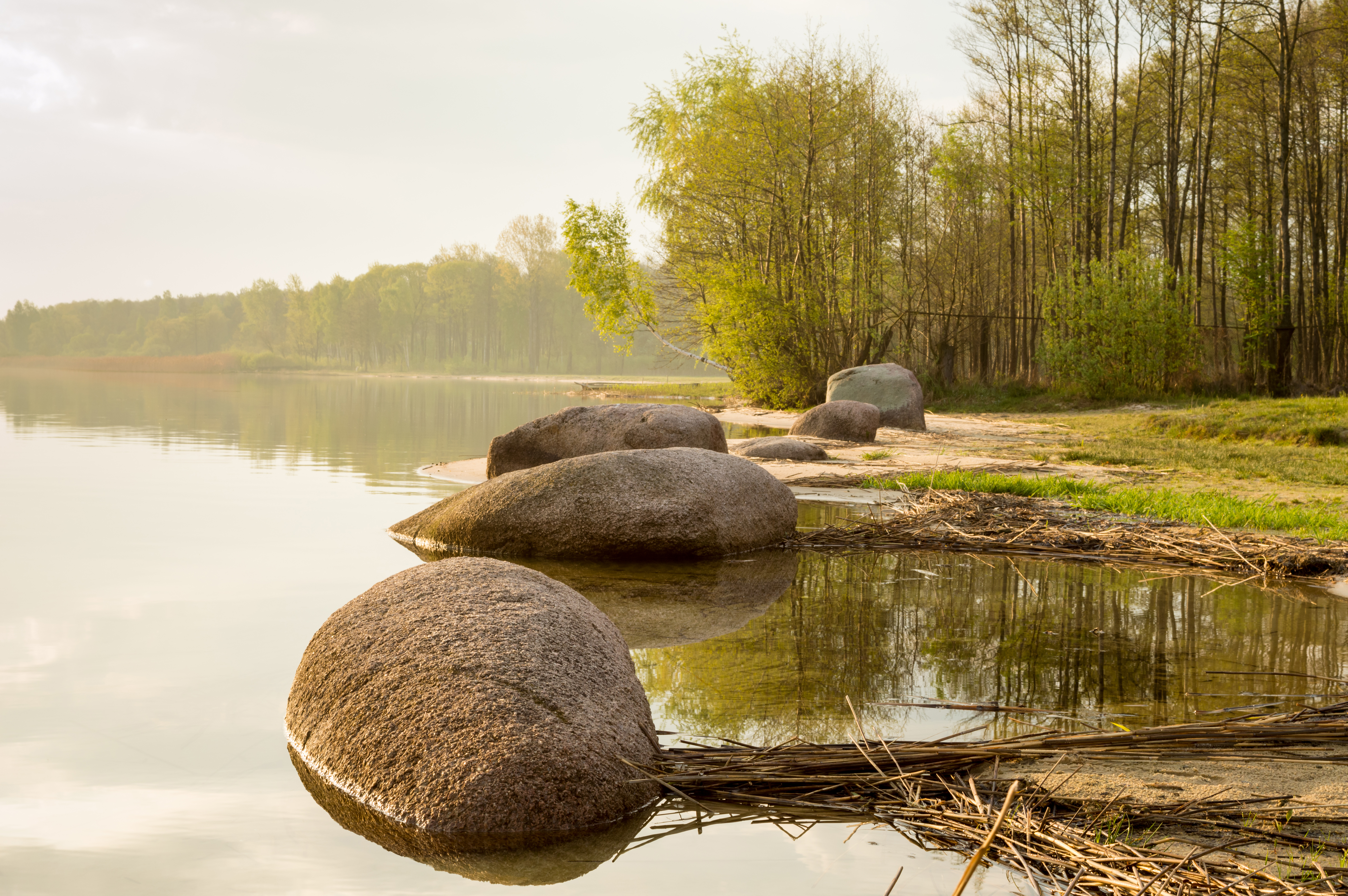
Shore of Lake Svityaz

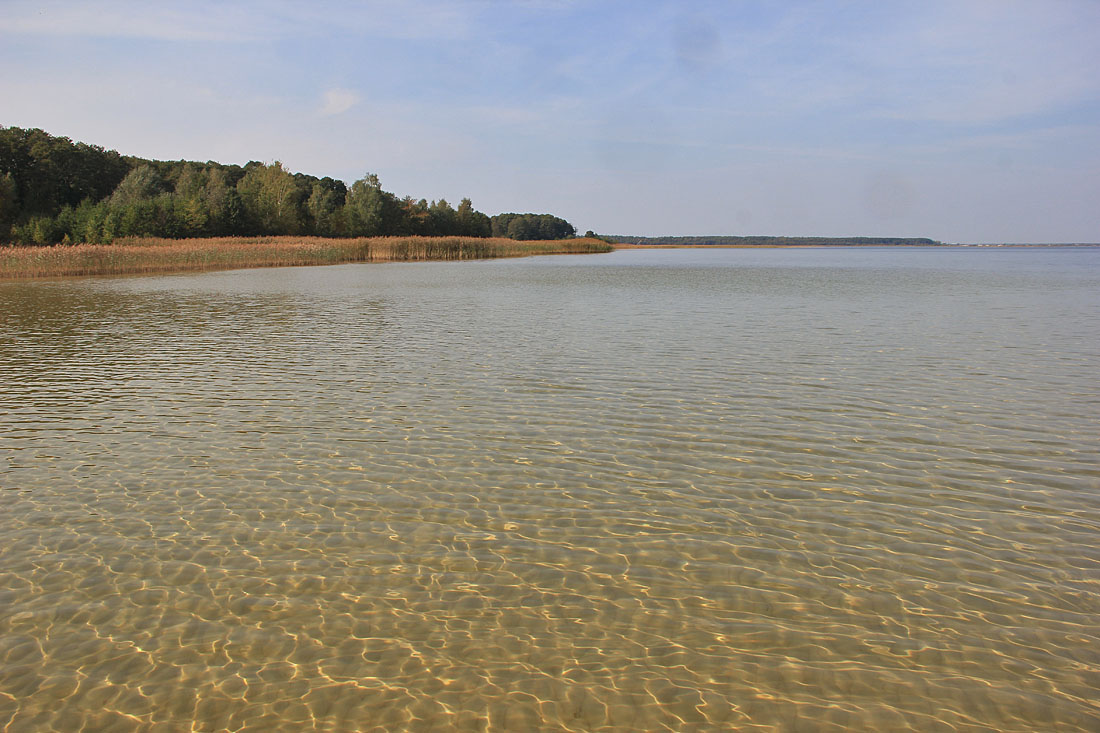
The clear water of Lake Svityaz

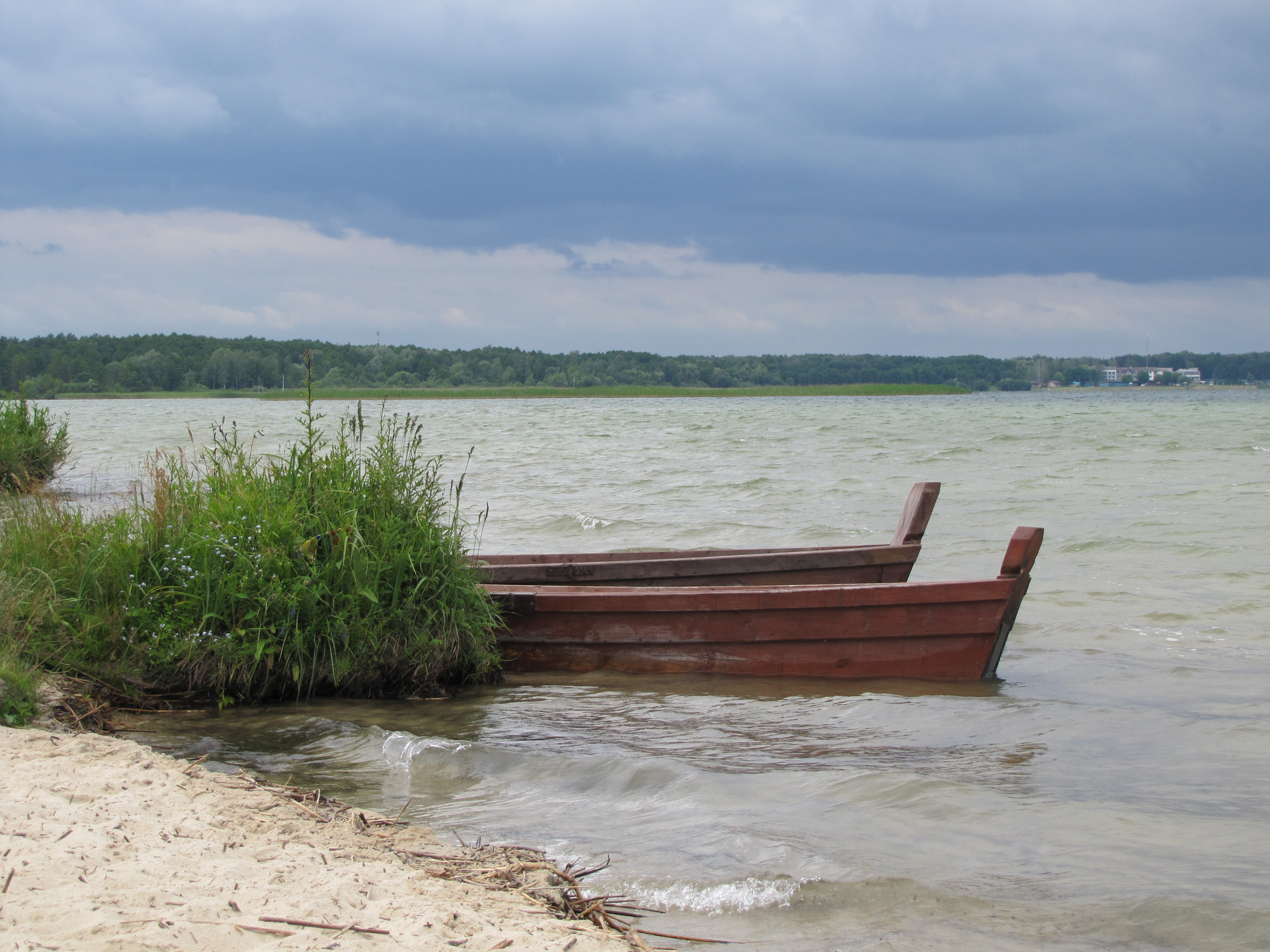
Nature of Lake Svityaz

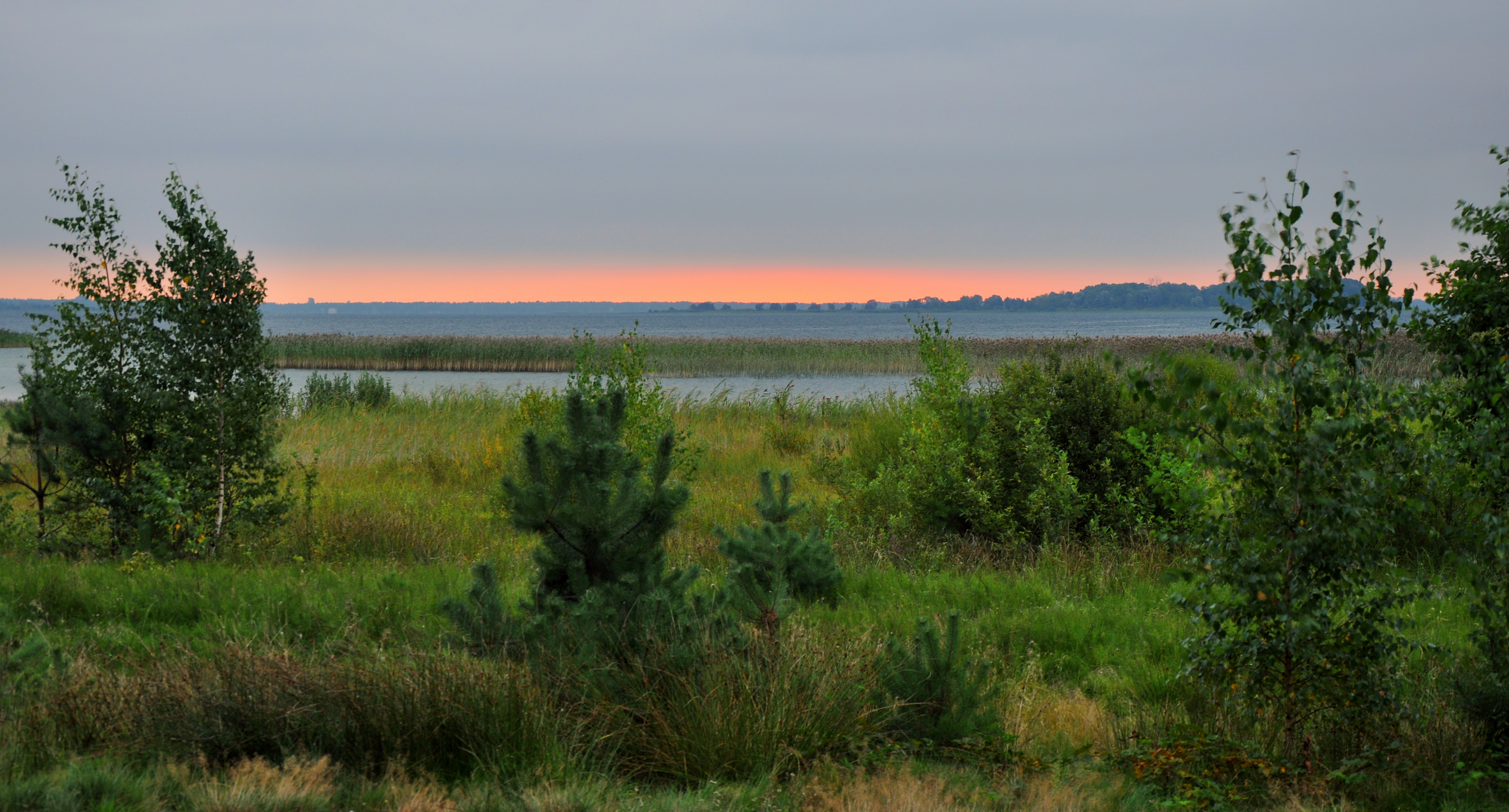
Nature of Lake Svityaz

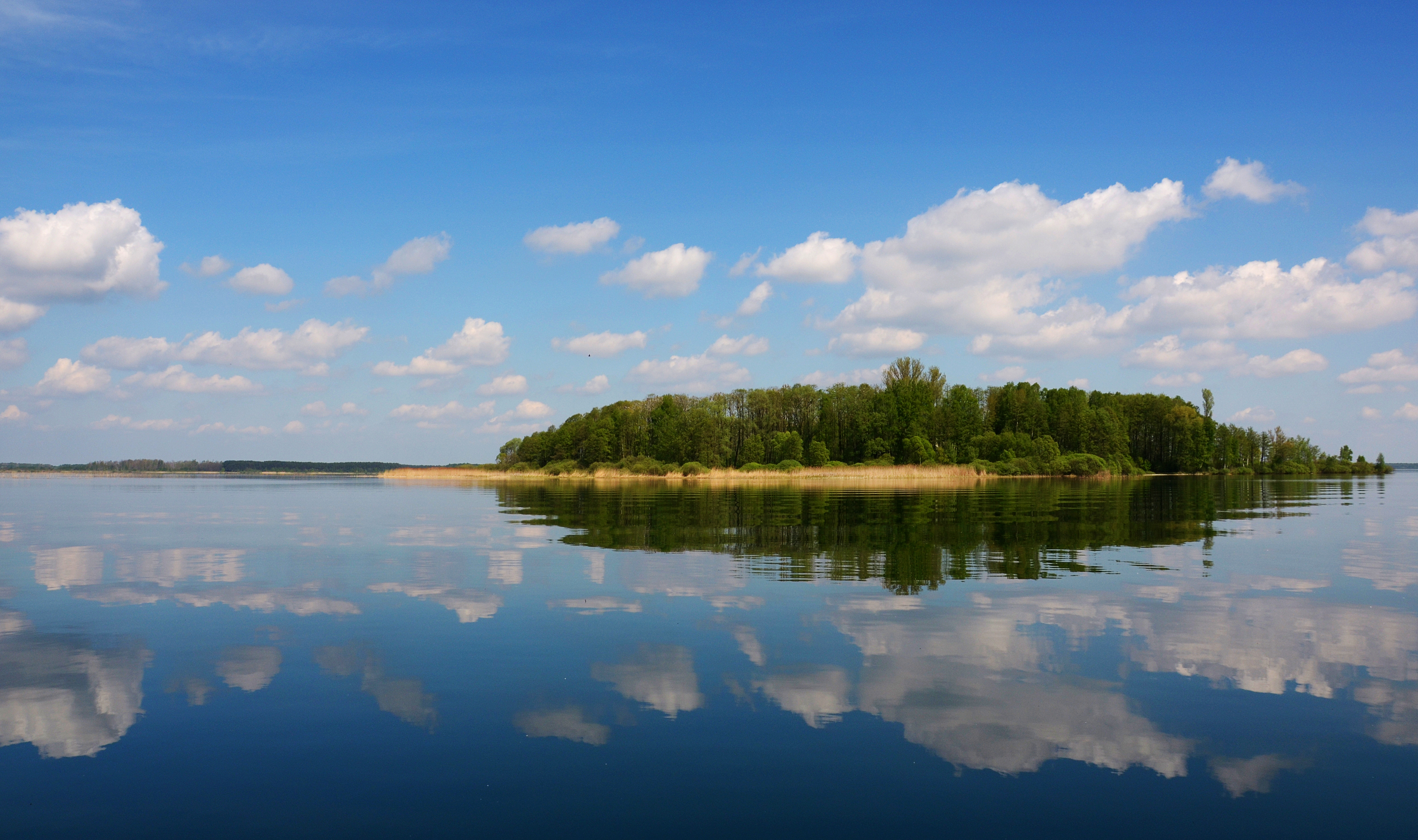
Island of Lake Svityaz

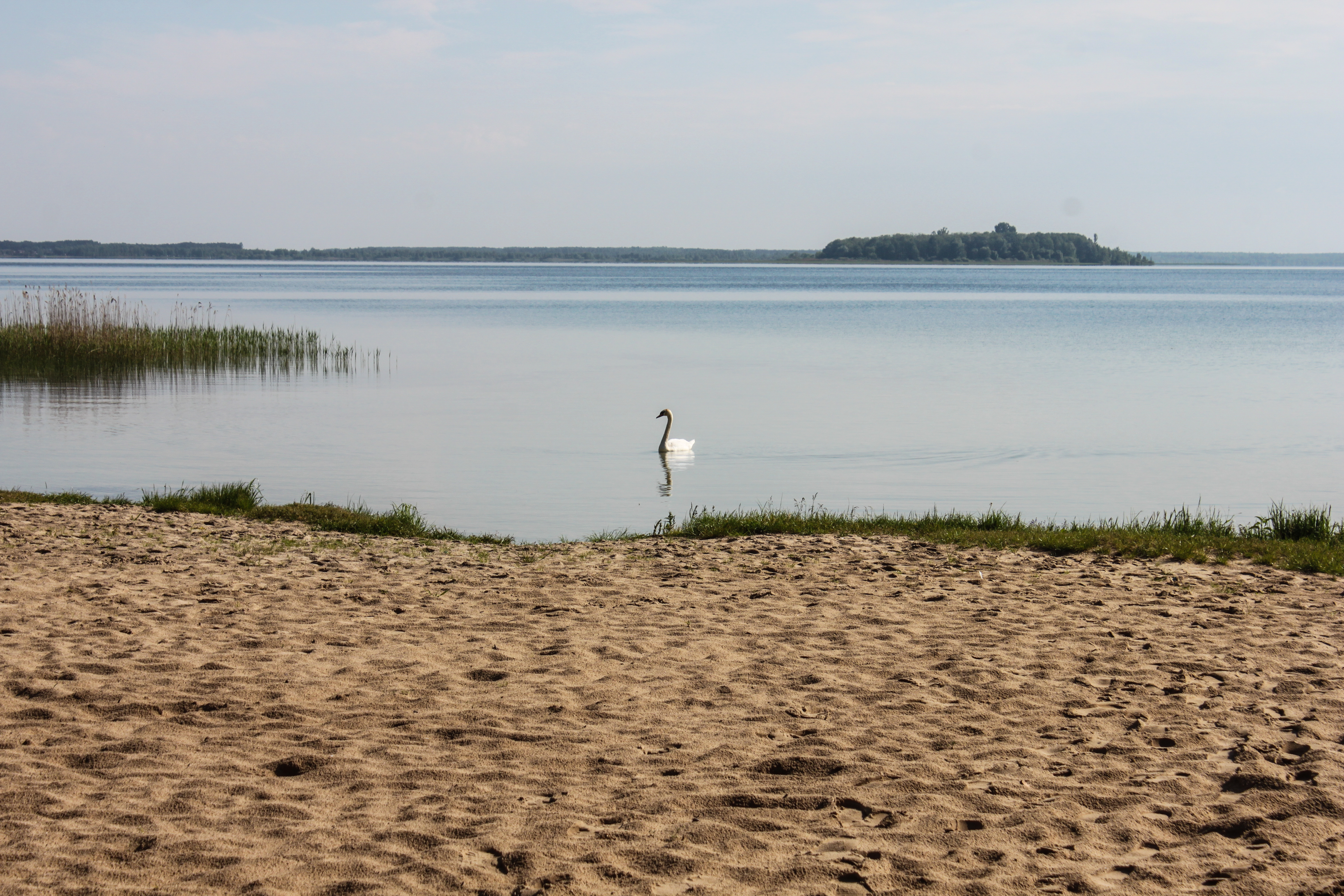
Shore of Lake Svityaz

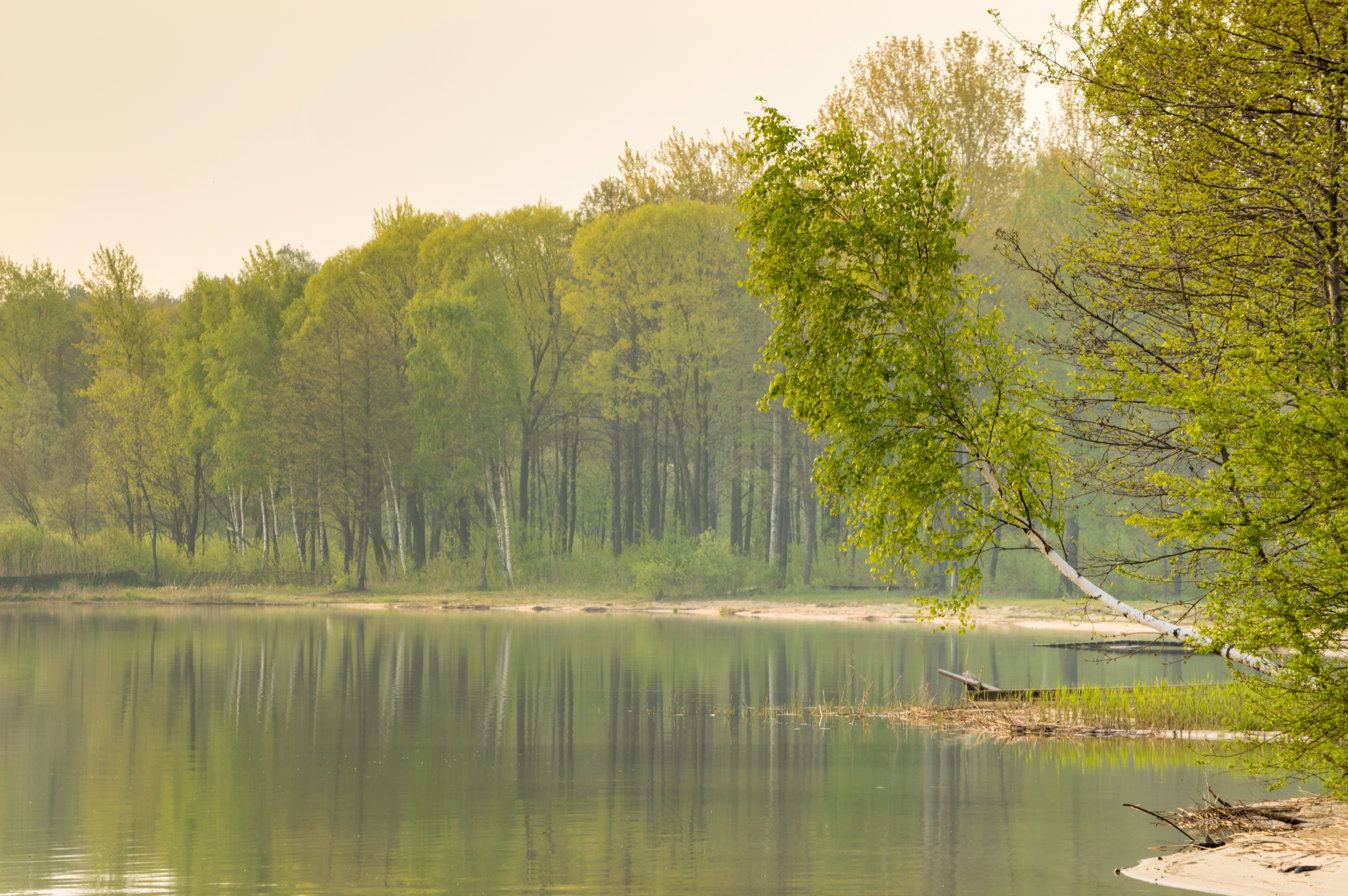
Spring on Svityaz

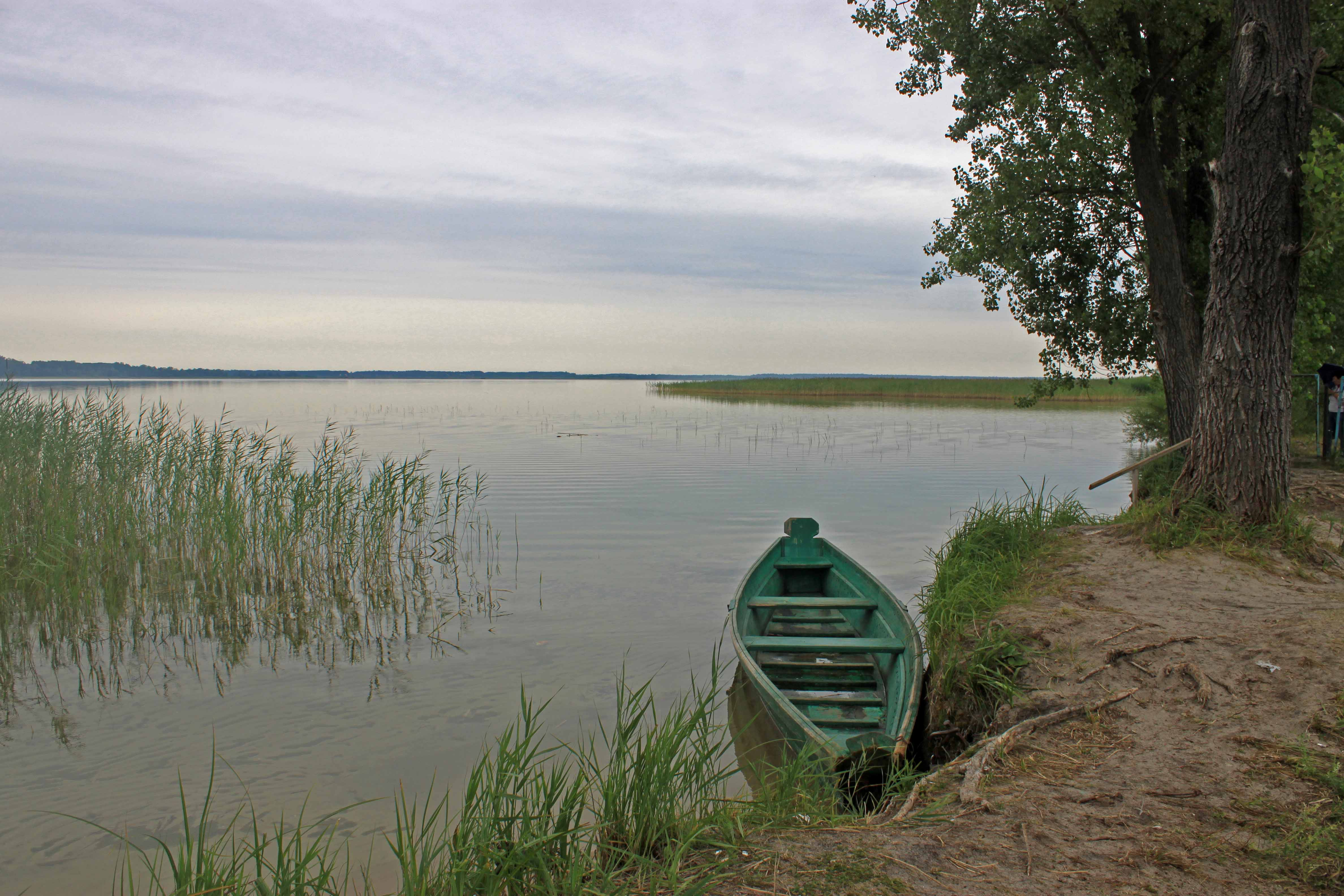
On the shore

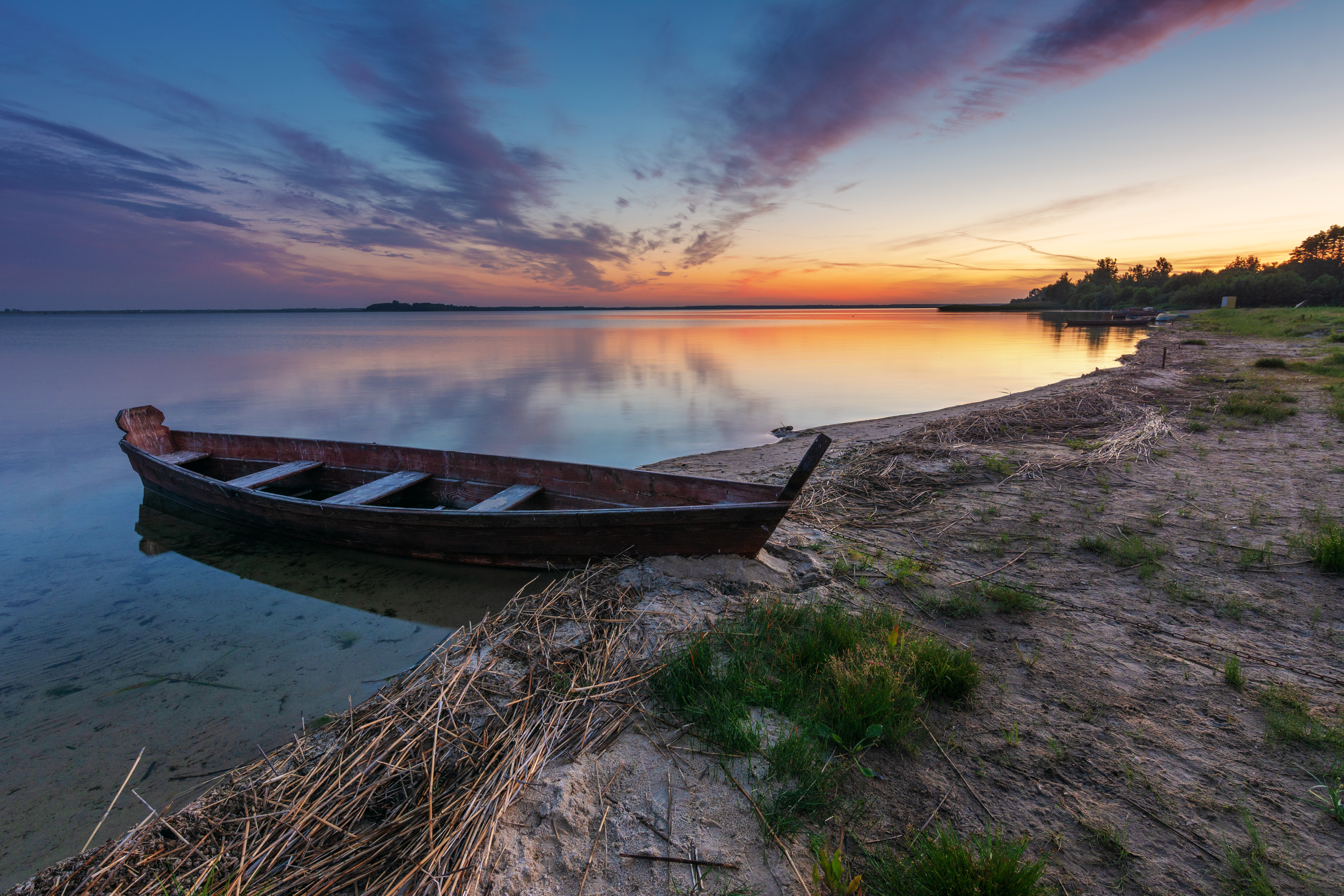
Dawn on Svityaz

== Bibliography ==
- Національний атлас України/НАН України, Інститут географії, Державна служба геодезії, картографії та кадастру; голов. ред. Л. Г. Руденко; голова ред. кол.Б.Є. Патон. — К.: ДНВП «Картографія», 2007. — 435 с. — 5 тис.прим. — ISBN 978-966-475-067-4.
