= Carex × uechtritziana =

Scientific classification
- Kingdom: Plantae
- Clade: Tracheophytes
- Clade: Angiosperms
- Clade: Monocots
- Clade: Commelinids
- Order: Poales
- Family: Cyperaceae
- Genus: Carex
- Species: C. × uechtritziana

Binomial name
- Carex × uechtritziana K.Richt.

Species of plant

Carex × uechtritziana is a species of sedge and is native to the Baltic States, France, Germany, Italy, and Northwest European Russia. Its parents are Carex acutiformis and Carex lasiocarpa.
