= Polesian Lowland =

- Part of the cross-border region of Polesia
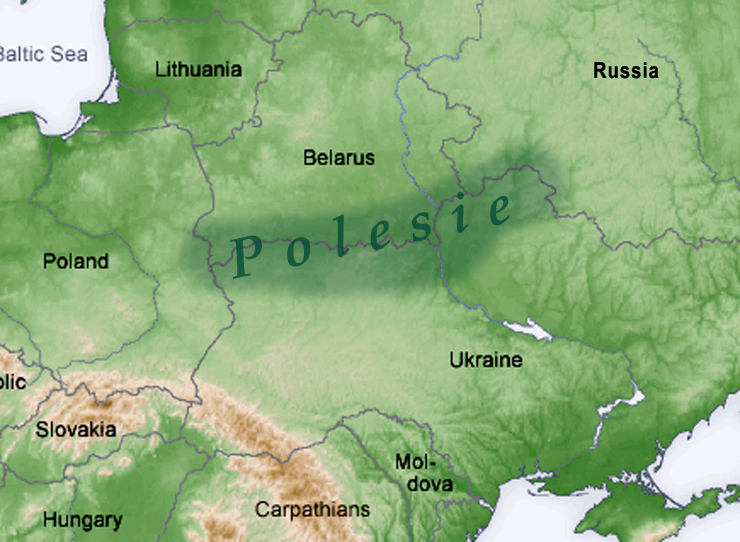
- Polesie region of Eastern Europe marked in dark green. One of the largest forest areas on the continent
- Countries: Ukraine, Belarus, Russia and Poland

The Polesian Lowland (Note: Ukrainian: Поліська низовина; Belarusian: Палеская нізіна; Russian: Полесская низменность) is a lowland in the southwestern portion of the East European Plain in the drainage basins of several rivers including the Dnieper, Pripyat and Desna. It stretches along the Belarus–Ukraine border. It basically defines the historical region of Polesia.

It is politically split into the Belarusian Polesia in the south of Belarus, Ukrainian Polissya in the north of Ukraine (where Волинське, Рівненське, Житомирське, Київське Полісся are distinguished), the eastern part of the lowland extends into Bryansk Oblast in the Russian Federation, and the western part extends into Poland.

== Geography ==
The lowland has an area of 270,000 km^{2} (100,000 sq mi). The Polesian Lowland is characterised by predominance of sandy lowlands with large, mostly swampy valleys. Its average elevation is 150–200 m (490–660 ft), while its maximum elevation is 316 m (1,037 ft) (Ovruch Ridge). Most of the lowland is located in the Pripyat River Valley. The lowland borders the Dnieper and Volyn Uplands in the south, the Western Bug River Valley in the west, and the Dnieper Lowland in the east. The historical region of Polissya is located within the Polissya Lowland. The lowland is divided into Belarusian Polissya in southern Belarus and Ukrainian Polissya in northern Ukraine. In Ukraine, the Polesie Lowland is located in the Volyn, Rivne, Zhytomyr and Kyiv regions.

The Polesie Lowland has a large number of lakes, the largest of which are Chervonoye (Belarus) and Svityaz (Ukraine).

The lowland is covered with mixed forests. Forests occupy about 33% of the territory, in some areas up to 60%.

Sod-podzolic soils and bog soils have developed on the territory of the Polissia Lowland. The Pripet Marshes are located along the Pripyat River Valley.

The climate of the lowlands is temperate continental, with warm and humid summers and mild winters. The average annual temperature varies from west to east from +6.5° to +7.5 °C. The annual amount of atmospheric precipitation is 550–650 mm, decreasing from west to east, with the highest quantity falling in June–July. The Polissia Lowland has a moisture coefficient of 1.2–1.6.

=== Ecology ===
A large part of Polissya was contaminated as a result of the Chernobyl disaster in 1986, part of the region ended up within the Chernobyl Exclusion Zone

Nature conservation areas have been created in the Polissya Lowland: Polissya Nature Reserve, Shatsk National Natural Park, Polissia Nature Reserve, and others. The black stork (Ciconia nigra), European otter (Lutra lutra Linnaeus), Eurasian lynx (Lynx lynx), brown long-eared bat (Plecotus auritus), and common noctule (Nyctalus noctula) are protected.

=== Minerals ===
Large areas of peat deposits have formed on the Polissia Lowland, with some locations having a thickness of up to 0.7 m. Amber deposits are widespread in the lowland, especially in the Zhytomyr and Rivne Oblasts Zhytomyr and Rivne regions. The Irshansk titanium ore deposit is also located in the lowland.

== Gallery ==
The Dnieper River in different regions

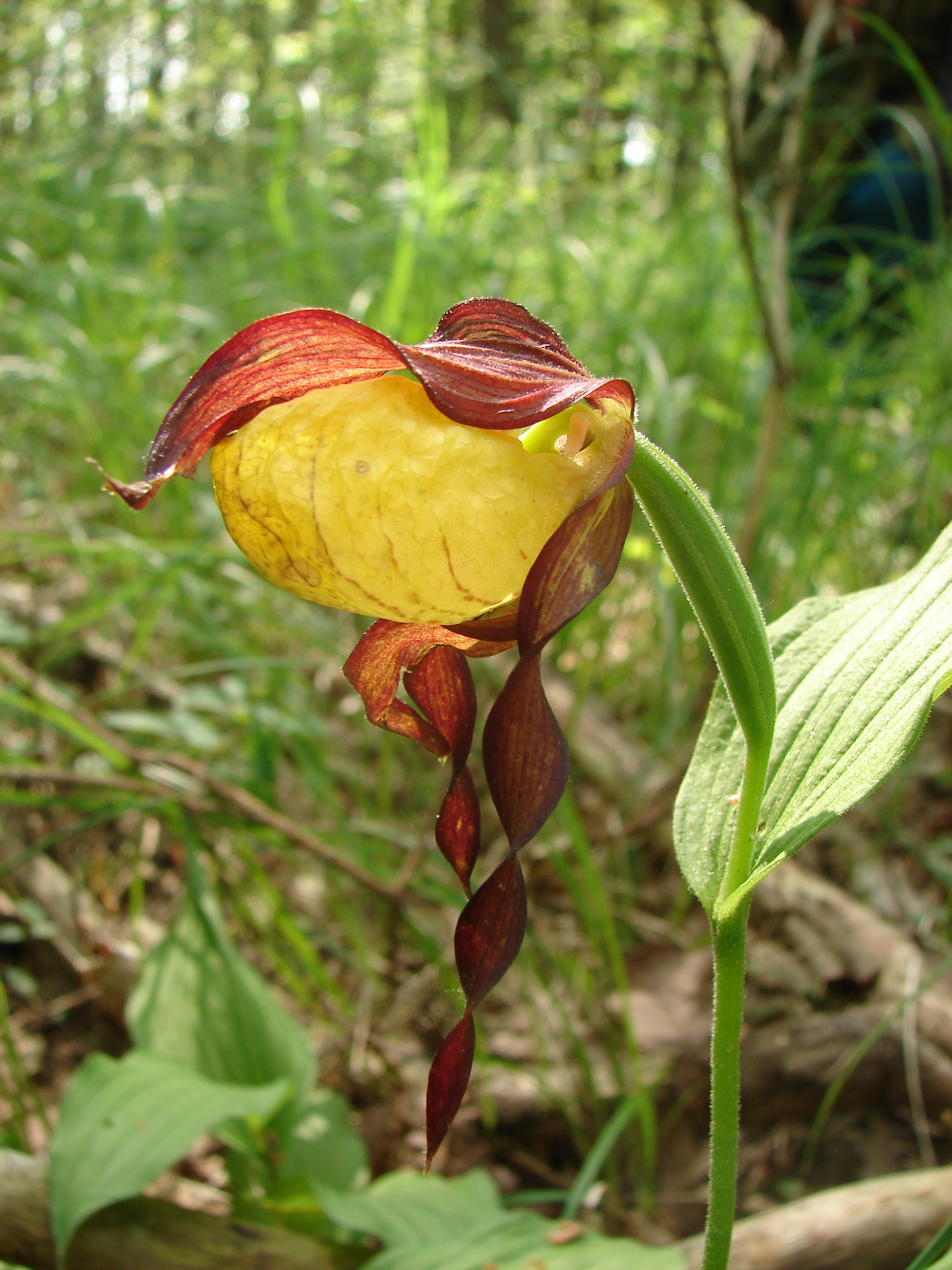
Cypripedium calceolus L.

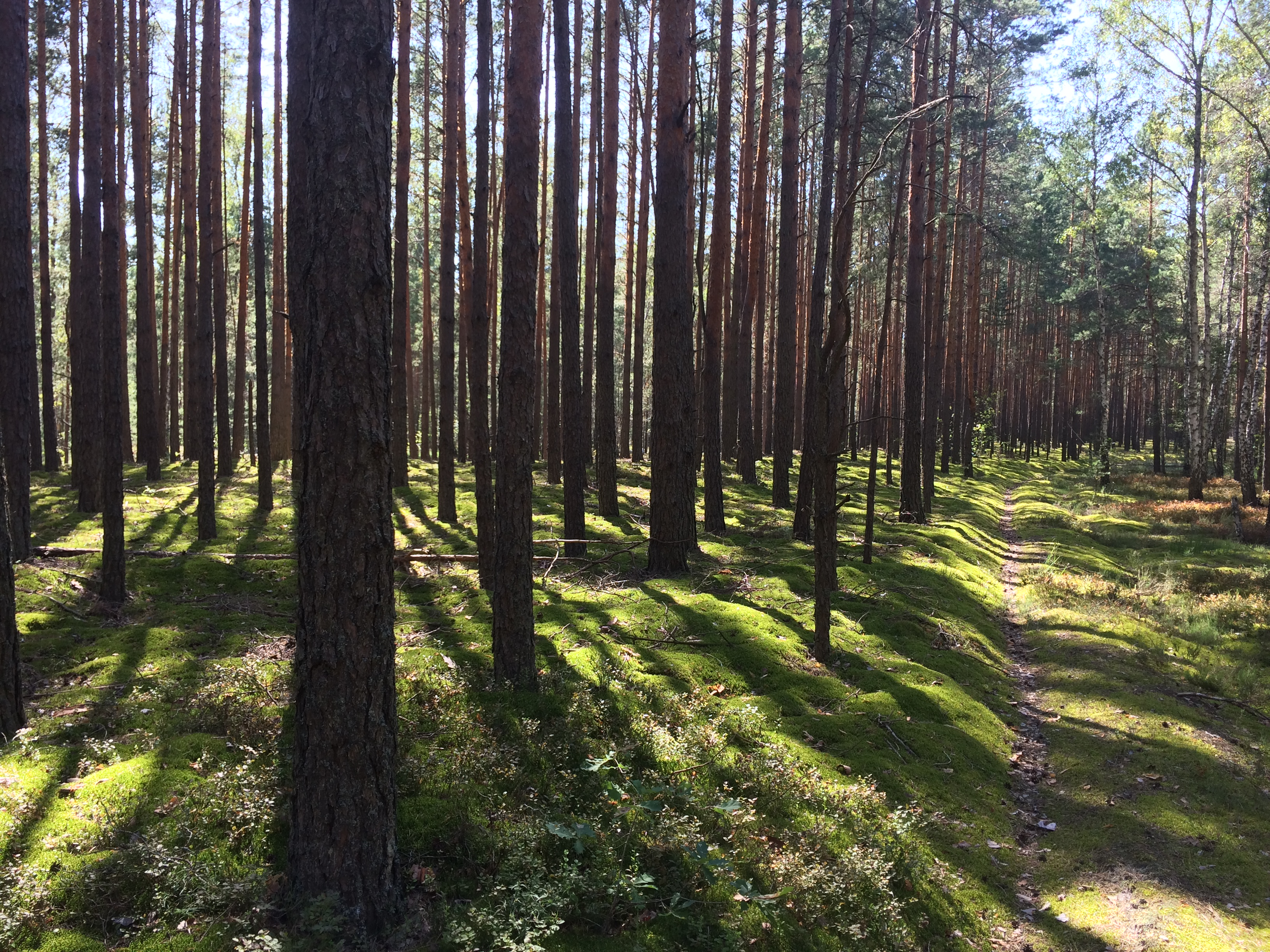
Pinewood

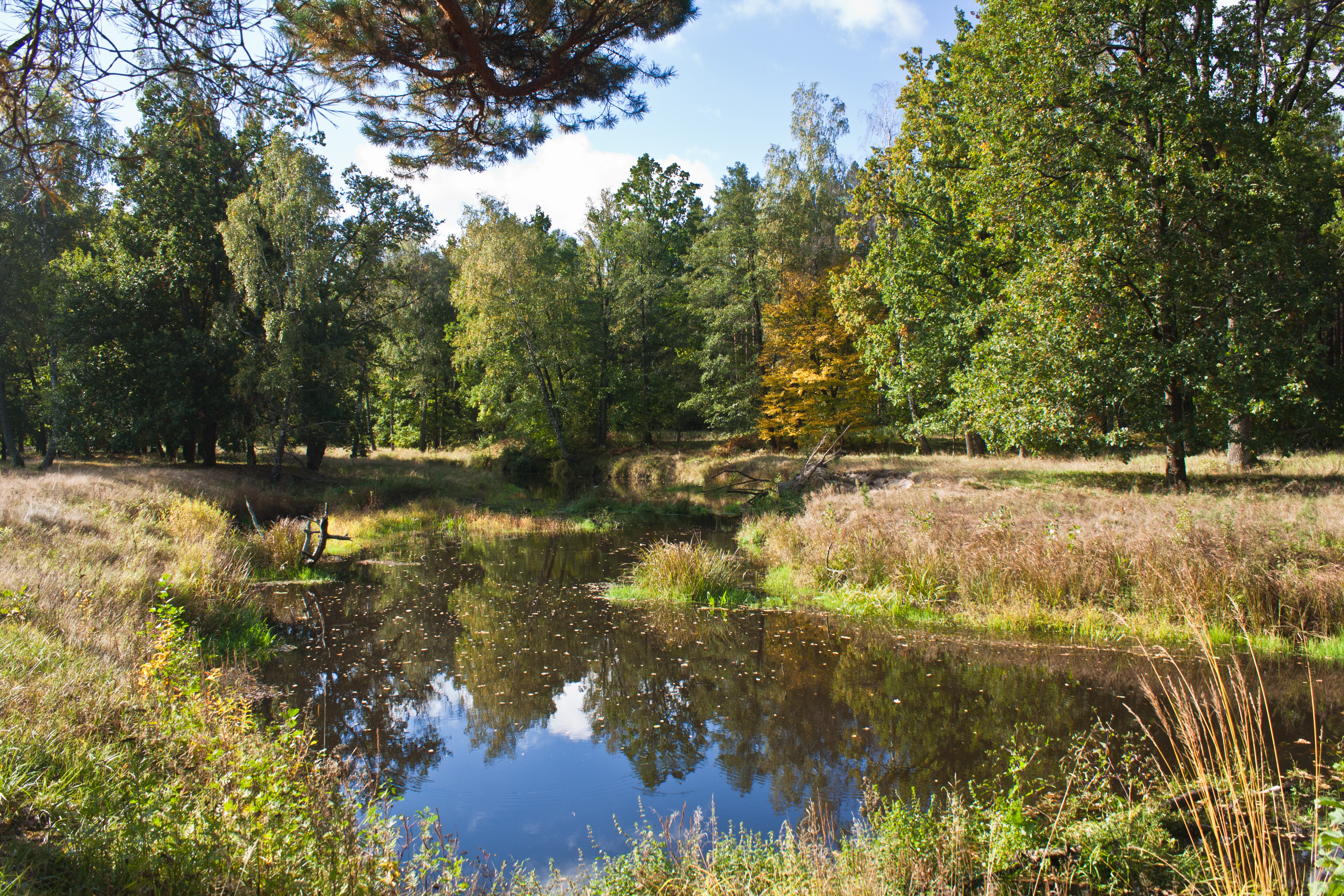
Nature of Zhytomyr Polissya

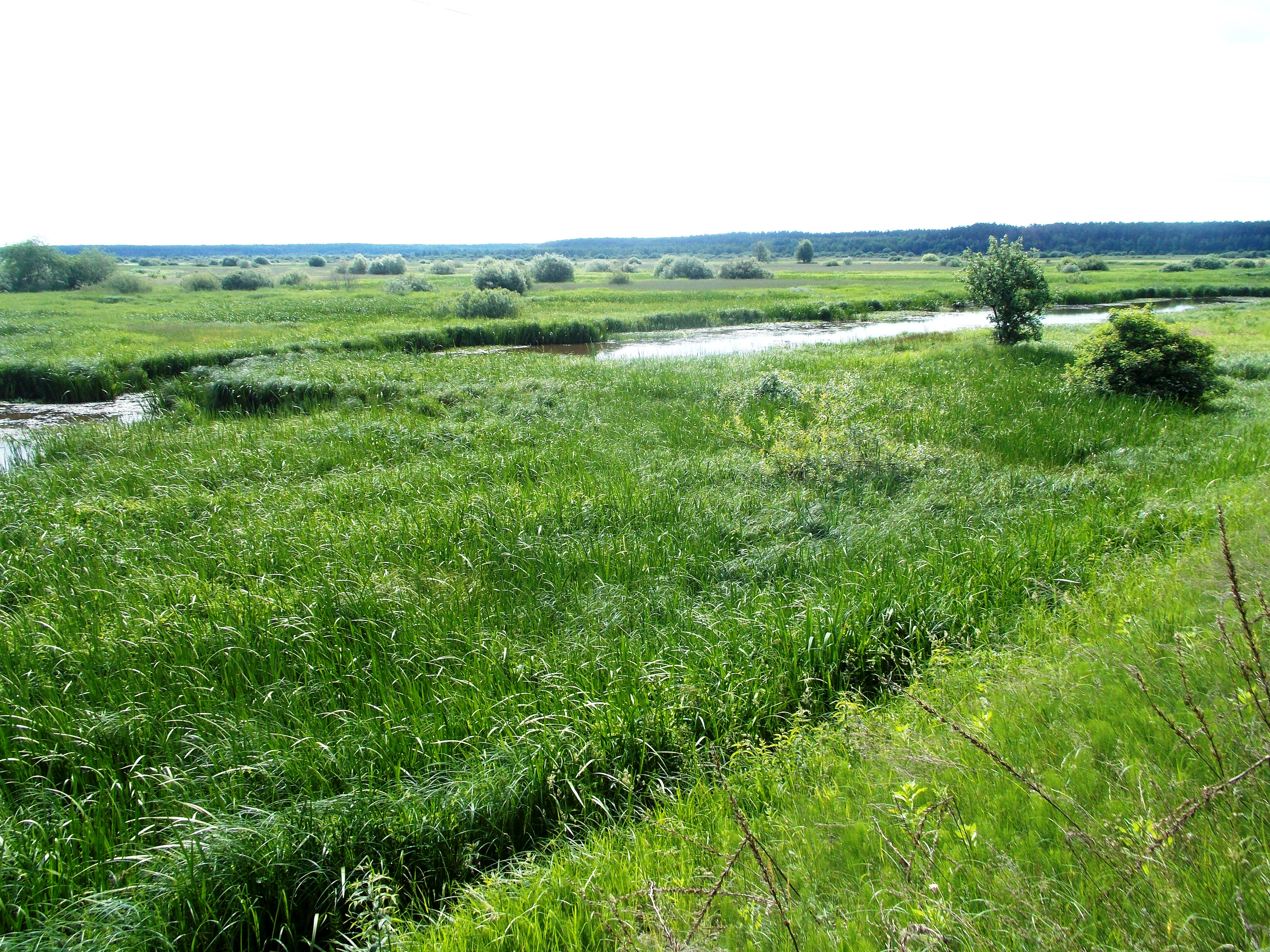
Floodplain swamps

== See also ==
- Polesian Lowland (Kaliningrad), named after the city of Polessk, Kaliningrad Oblast, Russia
- Dnieper Lowland
- Mazovian Lowland
