= Krugloye =

Krugloye Круглое
- Selo
- Location within Amur Oblast Location within Russia
- Coordinates: 50°52′N 128°51′E
- Country: Russia
- Region: Amur Oblast
- District: Belogorsky District
- Time zone: UTC+9:00

Krugloye (Russian: Круглое) is a rural locality (a selo) in Vasilyevsky Selsoviet of Belogorsky District, Amur Oblast, Russia. The population was 69 as of 2018. There are 6 streets.

== Geography ==
Krugloye is located on the left bank of the Tom River, 30 km east of Belogorsk (the district's administrative centre) by road. Pavlovka is the nearest rural locality.
