= Polissia Nature Reserve =

Nature reserve in Ukraine

- Ukrainian: Поліський природний заповідник
- IUCN category Ia (strict nature reserve)
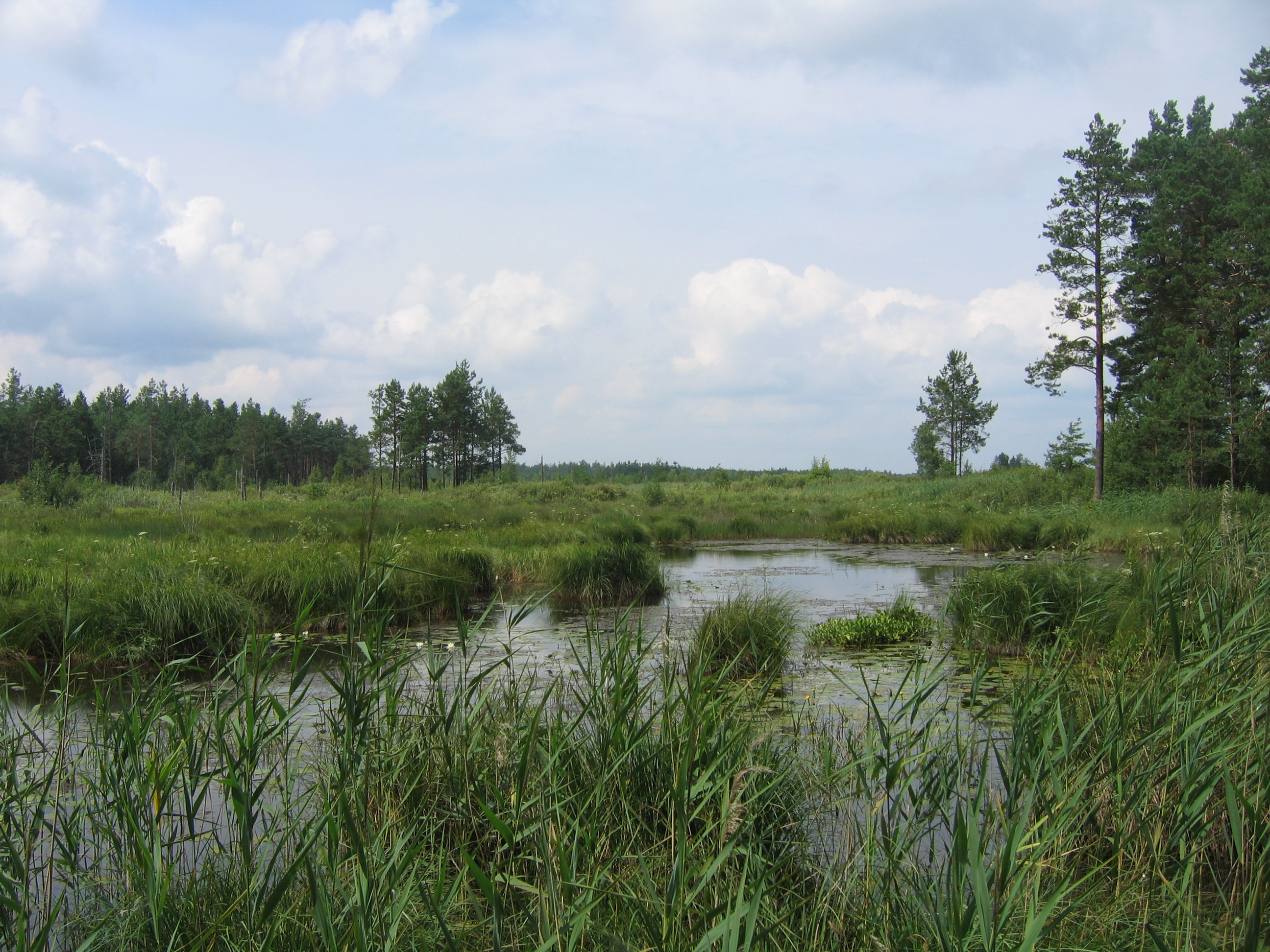
- Polissia Nature Reserve

- Location within Ukraine
- Location: Zhytomyr Oblast, Ukraine
- Nearest city: Ovruch
- Coordinates: 51°32′05″N 28°06′20″E
- Area: 20,104 hectares (49,678 acres; 201 km^{2}; 78 sq mi)
- Established: 1968
- Governing body: Ministry of Ecology and Natural Resources (Ukraine)
- Website: http://polesye-reserve.org.ua/

The Polissia Nature Reserve (Ukrainian: Поліський природний заповідник) is a protected nature reserve of Ukraine dedicated to the conservation and scientific study of representative woodland marshes of the Pinsk Marshes in the Polissia region. The reserve is in the administrative districts of Olevsk and Ovruch in Zhytomyr Oblast

== Topography ==
The reserve is located in lowlands between the Uborti and Bolotnisya Rivers, which flow into the Pripyat River. To the north is the border with Belarus, and to the west is Rivne Oblast. The territory is flat, and measures 21 km by 27 km. The relative impassibility of the swamps has protected wildlife in the area.

== Climate and ecoregion ==
The climate of the Polissia reserve is Humid continental climate, warm summer (Köppen climate classification (Dfb)). This climate is characterized by large seasonal temperature differentials and a warm summer (at least four months averaging over 10 °C (50 °F), but no month averaging over 22 °C (72 °F). In the reserve, average winter temperatures are −2.7 °C (27.1 °F), and 19.3 °C (66.7 °F) in the summer.

The reserve is located in the Central European mixed forests ecoregion, a temperate hardwood forest covering much of northeastern Europe, from Germany to Russia.

== Flora and fauna ==
The dominant vegetation are pine forests (on sandy soils) and sphagnum bogs. In the mixed forests portions there are also birches and alder. In the bogs the peat layer may be up to 5 meters thick. 604 species of vascular plants have been recorded in the site, about half of which are representative of tundra or taiga floral communities that stretch to the north. There are three types of swamps in the reserve. Lowland swamps are fed by mineral-rich groundwater are characterized by sedges, cane, and mosses. Upland swamps are mostly fed by precipitation and occupy mineral-poor soils; they support cotton grass, cranberries, blueberries, and sphagnum moss. In between are transitional swamps with characteristics of both lowland and upland areas.

The animals of the reserve are mostly forest species, many of which are found in more northerly taiga - lynx, elk, white hare and owls. The can survive in the Polissia due to the wetness and humidity rather than temperature. Beavers are active in the reserve, impounding water in places. Wolves are also common.

== Public use ==
As a strict nature reserve, Polissia's primary purpose is protection of nature and scientific study. Public access is limited: mass recreation and construction of facilities is prohibited as are hunting and fishing. The public is invited to participate in group ecological excursions led by park staff, subject to prior appointment. There is a nature museum open to the public, and cultural and historical centers.

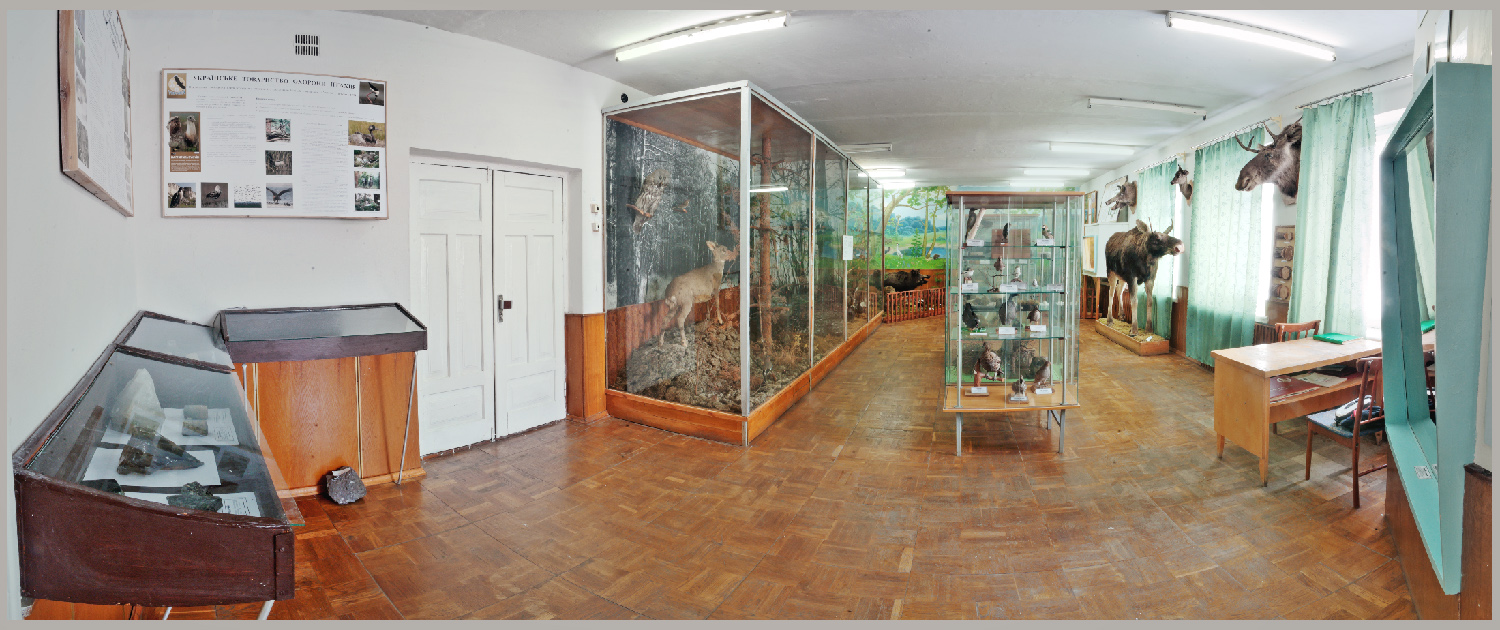
Nature Museum at the reserve

== See also ==
- Lists of Nature Preserves of Ukraine (class Ia protected areas)
- National Parks of Ukraine (class II protected areas)
