= Shatsk Raion =

Former subdivision of Volyn Oblast, Ukraine

Shatsk Raion Шацький район
- Raion
- Flag Coat of arms

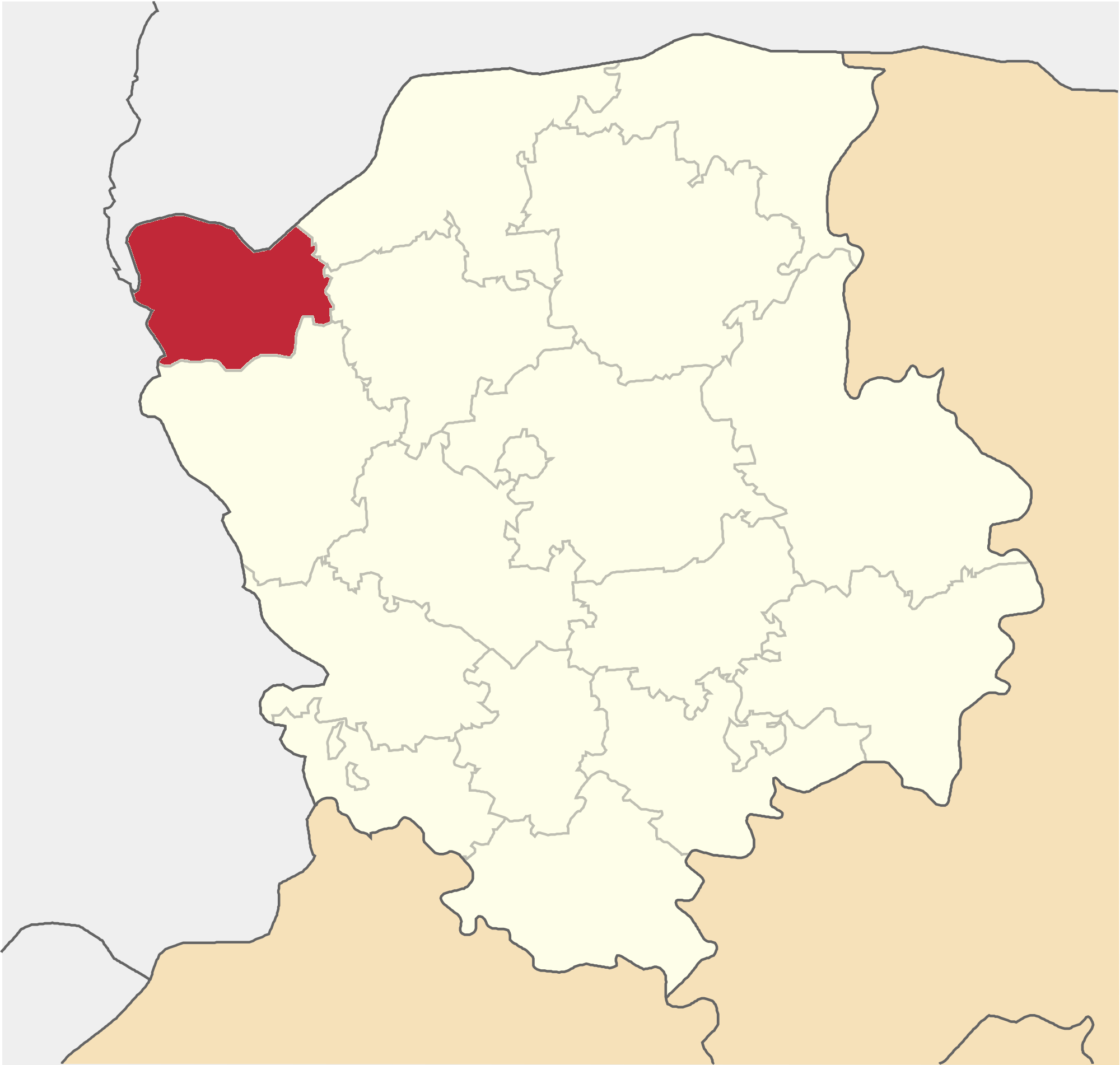
- Coordinates: 51°30′00″N 23°55′48″E
- Country: Ukraine
- Oblast: Volyn Oblast
- Established: 1993
- Disestablished: 18 July 2020
- Admin. center: Shatsk
- Subdivisions: List: — city councils; — settlement councils; — rural councils; Number of localities: — cities; — urban-type settlements; 30 — villages; — rural settlements

Area
  - Total: 759 km^{2} (293 sq mi)

Population (2020)
  - Total: 16,585
  - Density: 21.9/km^{2} (56.6/sq mi)
- Time zone: UTC+02:00 (EET)
  - Summer (DST): UTC+03:00 (EEST)
- Area code: 380-355
- Website: http://www.shaadm.gov.ua/ Shatskyi Raion

Shatsk Raion (Ukrainian: Шацький район) was a raion in Volyn Oblast in western Ukraine. Its administrative center was the urban-type settlement of Shatsk. The raion was abolished and its territory was merged into Kovel Raion on 18 July 2020 as part of the administrative reform of Ukraine, which reduced the number of raions of Volyn Oblast to four. The last estimate of the raion population was 16,585 (2020 est.)

== See also ==
- Administrative divisions of Volyn Oblast
