= Shatsk National Natural Park =

National park in Ukraine

- Ukrainian: Шацький національний природний парк
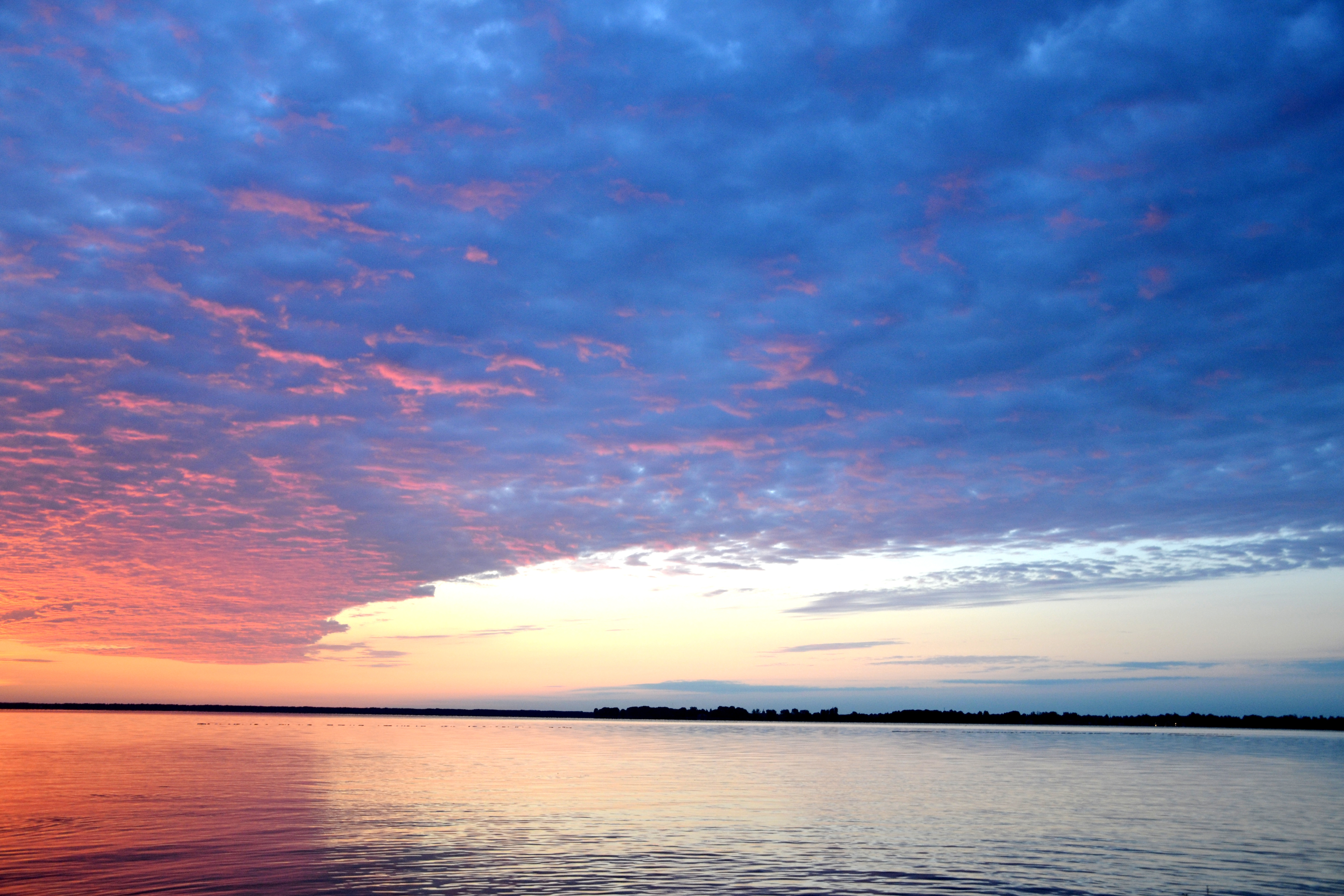

- Location within Volyn Oblast Location within Ukraine
- Location: Volyn Oblast, Ukraine
- Nearest city: Shatsk
- Coordinates: 51°31′01″N 23°49′12″E
- Area: 490 square kilometres (190 sq mi)
- Established: 1983
- Governing body: "State Forest Resources Service of Ukraine".

Ramsar Wetland
- Official name: Shatsk Lakes
- Designated: 23 November 1995
- Reference no.: 775

The Shatsk National Natural Park (Ukrainian: Шацький національний природний парк) is a national park of Ukraine which was established in 1983 and aimed to preserve, reconstitute and to use effectively Volyn Polissia natural complexes and objects of special environmental, recreational, educational and aesthetic value. The park is located on the territory of Kovel Raion in northwest part of Volyn Oblast. The general area of the park is 490 square kilometres (190 sq mi), 188 km^{2} (73 sq mi) of which are handed over for its permanent use. Lesia Ukrainka Volyn State University is a scientific curator. Two ecological paths, Svitiazianka and Lisova Pisnia, are working in the Shatsk NNP.

== General ==
The Shatskyi Lakes group is one of the biggest in Europe. On its territory there are more than thirty lakes of varying sizes. Their total area is almost 70 square kilometers. They constitute one of the biggest European groupings of lakes. Among them is Svitiaz, the deepest lake in Ukraine, with an area of 28 square kilometers and a depth of 58 metres (190 ft). The water reserve is 310 million cubic meters; 180.8 million cubic meters of them are kept in Svitiaz.

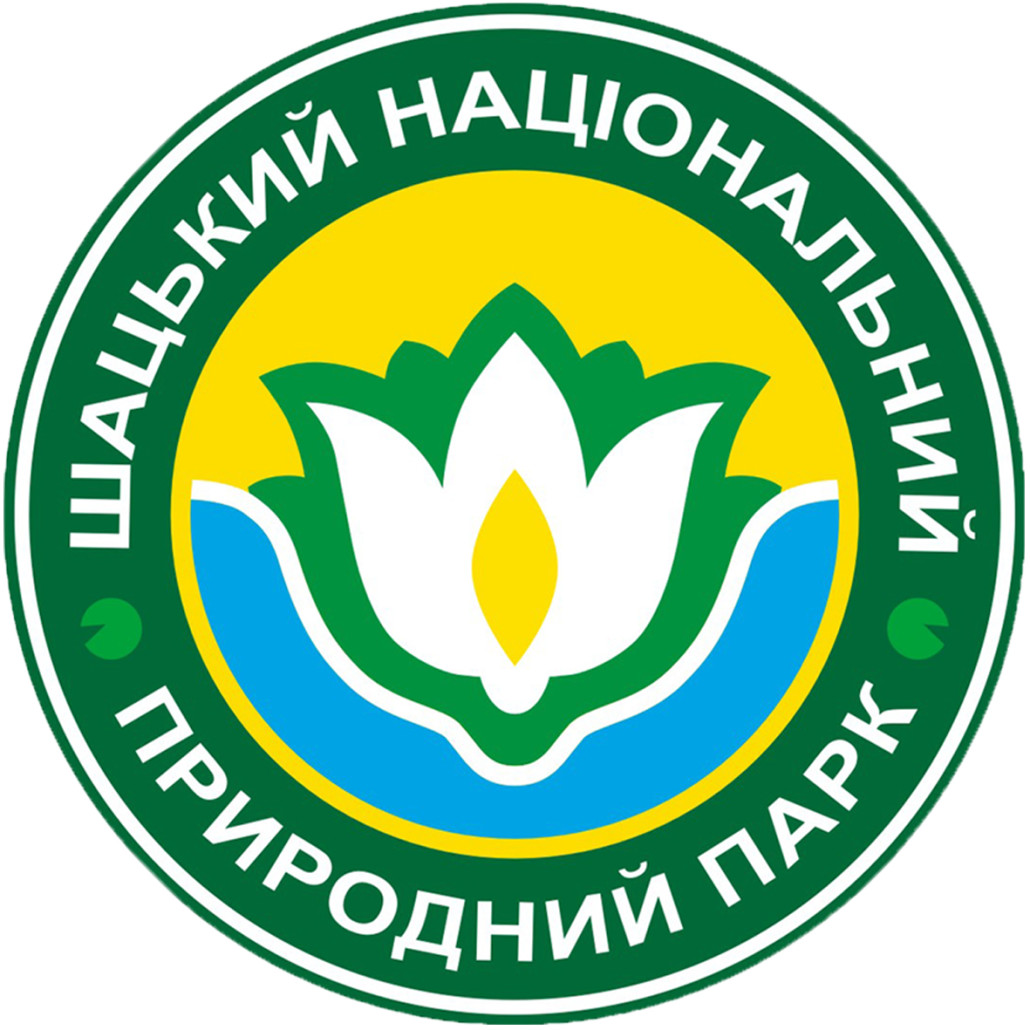
Park logo

The majority of lakes are joined to each other by soil-reclamation canals of Soviet or earlier times, or natural channels.

As long as the main European watershed goes through Shatsk Region, surplus water from them periodically replenishes basins of the Baltic and the Black seas via the Bug and the Vistula, the Prypiat and the Dnieper rivers accordingly.

Forests occupy 52.5% of general park area, grasslands 7.3%, marshes 2.8%, and water reservoirs 14.2%. The rest of the area is taken by farms and roads.

According to the Ramsar Water and Moor Protection agreement, the Shats'k lakes' lands which are situated between the Prypiat and the western Bug are considered to be one of the most important areas in Ukraine. In this territory, migrating birds can find places for their reproduction as well as food and rest on their way from the north to warmer countries.

The SNNP, together with the local administration, manage the main nature protection tasks. Due to these achievements, the park was included in the World Network of Biosphere Reserves (as West Polesie Transboundary Biosphere Reserve) within the frameworks of the UNESCO "Man and the Biosphere Programme" on April 30, 2002. By this act, the Shats'k lakes were referred to as some of the most precious complexes of the Earth. In Ukraine, Svitiaz Lake is considered to be one of the Seven Natural Wonders of Ukraine.

== Lakes ==
No.	Name	Water-surface area (hectares)	Length (m)	Width (m)	Maximum depth (m)	Average depth (m)	Water volume (million m^{3})	Height above sea level (m)
1	Svitiaz	2750	9225	4000	58.4	6.9	180.8	163.2
2	Pulemetske	1569	6125	3375	19.2	4.1	64.3	162.7
3	Luky	673	5950	1400	3.2	2.1	14.1	161.8
4	Peremut	146	1800	1300	6.7	2.2	3.2	161.8
5	Ostrovianske	257	2500	1450	3.8	2.3	5.9	162.6
6	Pisochne	189	1750	1450	16.2	6.9	13	162.2
7	Chorne Male	36	875	575	2.5	1.2	0.4	162.3
8	Somynets	43	1175	525	2.8	1.7	0.7	163.4
9	Moshne	36	800	600	3	2	0.7	160.7
10	Klymivske	29	850	450	3	1.5	0.4	162.4
11	Lynovets	9.5	450	325	3.7	1.6	0.2	163.3
12	Zvedenka	4	225	225	3.7	1.6	0.2	163.1
13	Rytets	4.4	250	200	3.7	1.6	0.2	163.1
14	Liutsymer	443	3075	1875	11	4.4	19.5	164.7
15	Krymne	145	2175	925	5.5	2.9	4.2	161.7
16	Chorne Velyke	82	1375	750	6	3	2.5	164.7
17	Ozertse	13.4	600	375	3	1.6	0.2	163.1
18	Karasynets	13.9	550	375	1.8	1.1	0.2	163.2
19	Dovhe	12	550	300	3	1.4	0.2	164.1
20	Plotychchia	11	475	325	2	0.5	0.1	163
21	Kruhle	8.6	400	300	2	1	0.1	164.4
22	Navrattia	2	175	150	2	1	0.1	163.3
23	Pyiavochne	1	120	80	2	1	0.1	163.3
24	Oleshno	5.8	350	300	2	1	0.2	162.5
Total	–	6354.6	–	–	–	–	311.5	

=== Svitiaz Lake ===
Svitiaz Lake is of karst origin; it was formed due to progradation of chalk rocks and subsequent huge cenotes. Nowadays the length of the lake is 9.3 km, its width is 4.8 km, and its surface is more than 27 square kilometers. The lake is fed by either artesian springs or precipitation.

Water in Svitiaz is extremely transparent (in sunny weather a submerged white circle is visible to a depth of 8 m), clean and soft. It is determined that it is rich in silver ions and glycerol.

Along the lakeside, especially in the area of the tract "Hriada" and hotel "Shatski Lakes", Svitiaz is mostly shallow and on sunny days warms up quickly. On a clean sandy bottom one can go a half or even two hundred meters until the water reaches the chest of an adult man. However, the depth of two meters has an area of 1.2 square kilometers, up to three meters – 7.2, up to five meters – 10.6, to ten meters – 4.2, more than ten – 5.3 square kilometers.

Therefore, Svitiaz is mainly a very deep lake. Yetclose to "Hriada", referred to as "shallow" above, there are underwater pits: Vovcha 20 m, Ohriadna 15 m, Kamin 14 m, and Verteneva 17 me. The maximum depth of the lake is 58.4 m, and the average depth is 7 m.

The lake has an island near the deepest place in Svitiaz – the Holodnetska cavity (58.4 m). A legend tells that all the Polissia used to be a sea with whales. When the sea dried out and only the deepest places remained, it became Svitiaz now and its whale became an island.

At the beginning of 1970, several European rabbits were settled there as an experiment. In a short time they quickly multiplied and practically destroyed all vegetation. They did not pose a threat only to the highest island trees – giant poplars which had very rough bark. In order to save the island, foresters had to kill them.

The island is one of the few places in Ukraine where Epidalea calamita toads live. There is also mass bird nesting, many species of which are rare. During nesting, visiting the island is prohibited.

In Svitiaz and other lakes of the park, the use of motor boats that may pollute water with fuel or oils is prohibited.

== Flora and fauna ==
In the Shatsk Lakes territory, 1180 species of plants belonging to 124 families are found. Among them there are 795 species of higher vascular plants and 112 bryophytes. 332 vertebrate species have been noted in the park: 55 mammals, 241 birds, 7 amphibians, and 29 fish (11 families).

=== Forests ===
Pine and blueberry forests dominate the territory of the park. Alder and birch forests grow in the lowlands. Fauna is represented by typical woodlands species: elk, wild boar, roe deer, rabbits, squirrels. Otter, badger, polecat, marten are rarer. In the waters of the park are about 30 species of fish: Common roach, Common bream, Northern pike, carp, two catfish species (the introduced Channel catfish and the native Wels catfish), European eel and others.

Three major faunal types are represented within Shatsk National Park: forest, wetland and synanthropic. In proportion, the first and second types dominate.

The composition of the forest complex includes a third of the mammals and more than a half of the entire fauna in the park. Most characteristic representatives of a forestry complex are:

==== Mammals ====
De Selys Longchamps, Apodemus sylvaticus L., Dryomys nitedula Pall. and Glis glis L., Sciurus vulgaris L., Erinaceus europaeus L, Talpa europaea L., Sorex araneus L., Sorex caecutiens Laxm. Sorex minutus L., Crocidura suaveolens Palb. and C. leucodon Herman, Eptesicus serotinus Schreb., Mustela putorius L., Martes martes L., Mustela erminea L., Lepus europaeus Pallas, Vulpes vulpes L., Sus scrofa L., Capreolus capreolus L., Alces alces L.

==== Birds ====
Columba palumbus L., Streptopelia turtur L., Astur gentilis L. and Accipiter nisus L., Buteo buteo L., Strix aluco L. and Asio otus L., Cuculus canorus L., Caprimulgus europaeus L., Upupa epops L., Jynx torquilla L., Dryocopus martius L., Dendrocopos major L., Dendrocoptes medius L., Dryobates minor L., Lullula arborea L., Anthus trivialis L., Troglodytes troglodytes L., Erithacus rubecula L., Luscinia luscinia L., Oenanthe oenanthe L., Turdus merula L., T. philomelos L. and T. pilaris L., Curruca curruca L., Phylloscopus trochilus L., P. collybitus Vieill. and P. sibilatrix Bechst., Ficedula hypoleuca Pall. and Muscicapa striata Pall., Poecile montanus L., Sitta europaea L., Certhia familiaris L., Emberiza citrinella L., Fringilla coelebs L., Linaria cannabina L., Sturnus vulgaris L., Oriolus oriolus L., Garrulus glandarius L., Corvus cornix L., С. corax L. and other.

=== Wetland ===
The wetland complex (lakes, marshes, wet meadows) contains about one-third of all the Park's warm-blooded creatures (about 30 mammal species and 60 birds). The most characteristic representatives are:

==== Mammals ====
Common mole, common shrew, white-toothed shrew, ermine and voles (Arvicola terrestris L. and Microtus agrestis L.).

==== Birds ====
Podiceps cristatus L., Ardea cinerea L., Cygnus olor Gm., Anas platyrhynchos L. and A. querquedula L, Aythya fuligula L., Porzana porzana L., Zapornia parva Scop., Rallus H L., Fulica atra L., Vanellus vanellus L., Tringa totanus L., Gallinago gallinago L., Scolopax rusticola L., Limosa limosa L., Chroicocephalus ridibundus L., Sterna hirundo L. and Chlidonias nigra L., Circus aeruginosus L., Motacilla alba L. and M. flava L., Anthus pratensis L., Riparia riparia L., Lanius excubitor L., Locustella fluviatilis Wolf., Acrocephalus schoenobaenus L., A. palustris Bechst., A. scirpaceus Herrn. and A. arundinaceus L., Emberiza schoeniclus L., Pica pica L., Corvus cornix L., and others.

=== Farms, settlements ===
The synanthrophic complex (farmland, settlements) consists of the smallest amount of warm-blooded, only about 20% of the total amount in the Park. The most characteristic representatives are:

==== Mammals ====
Mus musculus L. and Apodemus agrarius Pall., Microtus arvalis Pall., Rattus norvegicus Berktnhout, Erinaceus europaeus L., Talpa europaea L., Plecotus auritus L., Muscardinus avellanarius L. and Gris gris L., Lepus europaeus Pall., Mustela nivalis L., Mustela putorius L. and Martes foina (Erxleben).

==== Birds ====
Perdix perdix L., Ciconia ciconia L., Columba livia Gm., Streptopelia decaocto Friv., Athene noctua Scop., Strix aluco L., Apus apus, Alauda arvensis L., Motacilla alba L., swallows (Hirundo rustica L. and Delichon urbicum L.), Luscinia luscinia L., Phoenicurus ochruros Gm., thrushes (Turdus merula L. and Turdus philomelos Brehm), warblers (Sylvia borin Bodd. and Sylvia atricapilla L.), Serinus саnariа L., Chloris chloris L., Carduelis carduelis L., linnet, sparrows (Passer domesticus L. and Passer montanus L.), Sturnus vulgaris L., magpie, rook (Corvus frugilegus L.), jackdaw (Coloeus monedula L.) and others.

== Functional zones ==
In order to perform its tasks and in accordance with the general plan and the Ukrainian Law "About the Nature Reserve Fund of Ukraine", the park's territory is divided into four functional zones. The zones were pointed out by taking into consideration such factors as a level of the natural complexes preservation, a landscape type, traditional economic activities, a state of flora and fauna objects, cultural and aesthetic values of the objects. The distinguished zones are the following:

- a sanctuary zone (10.5%) is to protect and restore the most precious natural complexes; it is regulated by the nature reserve's requirements;
- a zone of the regulated recreation (26.5%) is to provide people's short time rest and sanitation as well as sightseeing; it is allowed to arrange tourists paths and ecological lanes; it's prohibited to cut woods and to fish for the industrial purposes, to hunt and perform other activities that might cause a negative influence on the nature protection complexes and other objects of the sanctuary zone. On this territory there are two ecological lanes – "Sv- itiazianka" and "Lisova Pi- snia", two recreation posts – "Peremut" and "Turyst" and two information posts in this zone.
- a zone of the stationary recreation (2.0%) is for the placing of the hotels, motels, camps and other objects that provide the park visitors service. In this zone there are three youth recreation camps, a holiday hotel "Shatski Ozera", a sanatorium "Lisova Pisnia", six educational institutions and 77 rest houses basis.
- an economic zone (61%) – in its frames traditional Economic activities are carried out; they are aimed to fulfill the tasks given to the Park; on this area there are settlements and the Park's community service objects that function with the respect of the general nature protection requirements.

On the territory of the SNNP different scientific investigations are conducted to prevent any possible deterioration of the ecological situation in the Shats'k lakes district. The Park's scientific department also works in the frames of the "Nature Chronicle Program for the Sanctuaries and Nature National Parks".

== Rare plants and animals ==
The Green Book of Ukraine includes 14 plant communities among them rare for Ukraine pine forests with undergrowth of juniper communities featuring spruce, located on the southern edge of the range, as well as rare for Polissia leucobryum pine forest, bearberry pinery, thorny ground-pinery, arctic dwarf birch grouping and others.
Red Book of Ukraine indicates categories depending on the state and degree of threat to the population:
– (0) – extinct species, any information about their stay in the wild is absent after repeated searches conducted in common areas or other prominent locations and possible places of spread,
– (1) endangered species under threats of extinction, preservation of them is unlikely if the pernicious effect of factors that affect their condition continues,
– (2) – vulnerable species which in the near future can be categorized disappearing, if effect of factors that affect their condition continues,
– (3) – rare species of small populations, which are not classified as endangered or vulnerable, although they are in danger,
– (4) – undetermined species known as endangered or rare, but reliable information that would allow to determine to which of these categories they belong is absent,
– (5) – insufficiently known species which could be possibly be attributed to one of the above categories, but in the absence of other reliable information question remains not determined,
– (6) – recovered species, which populations not cause concern thanks to the measures taken for their protection, however, is not to be used and require constant monitoring.

27 species of plants belong to the Red Book

Aldrovanda vesiculosa L. – (3)
Betula humilis Schrank. – (3),
Cephalanthera rubra Rich. – (2),
Neottia nidus-avis Rich. – (3),
Botrychium lunaria Sw. – (2),
Diphasiastrum camplanatum Holub. – (2),
Liparis loeselii Rich. – (2),
Vaccinium microcarpum Turcz ex Rupr. – (1)
Orchis coriophora L. (3),
Neottia ovata L. – (3),
Cypripedium calceolus L. – (2),
Epipactis palustris L. – (3),
Epipactis atrorubens Schult. – (3)
Epipactis helleborine L. – (3)
Lycopodium inundatum L. (3),
Lilium martagon L. – (3),
Platanthera bifolia Rich. – (3),
Cladium mariscus (L.) Pohl – (2)
Carex davalliana Smithjg-(2)
Carex umbrosa Host. – (2),
Dactylorhiza incarnata L. 1 (3),
Dactylorhiza maculata L, – (3)
Dactylorhiza majalis Hunt. – (3),
Dactylorhiza fuchsii (Druce). – (3),
Lycopodium annotinum L. – (3),
Drosera anglica Huds. – (2),
Drosera intermedia Naune. – (2),
Pinguicula vulgaris L. (2),
Scheuchzeria palustris L. (2).

33 species of vertebrates

Neomys anomalus Cabrera – (3)
Lutra lutra L. – (2),
Mustela erminea L. – (4),
Meles meles L. – (2),
Pelecanus onocrotalus L. – (2),
Ardeola ralloides L. – (2),
Ciconia nigra L. – (2),
Cygnus bewickii Yarr. – (3),
Aythya nyroca Guld. g (2)
Bucephala clangula L. – (3),
Somateria mollissima L. – (3),
Oxyura leucocephala L. – (4),
Pandion haliaetus L. – (3),
Milvus milvus L, – (1)
Circus cyaneus L. – (1)
Circaetus ferox Gmelin. – (3),
Clanga pomarina Ch. L. Brehm – (3)
Aquila chrysaetos L. – (3),
Haliaeetus albicilla L. – (2),
Falco cherrug Gray. – (3),
Grus grus L. – (2),
Haematopus ostralegus L. – (3),
Tringa stagnatilis Beehst – (2)
Himantopus himantopus L. – (2),
Numenius arquata L. – (2),
Numenius phaeopus L. – (2),
Hydroprogne caspia L. – (3),
Bubo bubo L. – (2),
Lanius excubitor L. (4),
Acrocephalus paludicola L. (3),
Regulus ingicapillus L. – (4).

== Vacation ==
In summer Shatsk's population (6,300) increases threefold. The number of people in the area (in winter 17,300) increases to 40,000 and more.

== See also ==
- Seven Natural Wonders of Ukraine
- National parks in Ukraine
- Svitiaz

== Sources ==
1. Шацький національний природний парк. Історія та сьогодення / В. Мельник, О. Бірюліна; Шацький нац. прир. парк, Проект Програми розвитку ООН/Глобального екологічного фонду "Зміцнення управління та фінансової стійкості національної системи природоохоронних територій в Україні". – Луцьк: Волиньполіграф, 2010. – 130 с.
2. Шацьке поозер'я: краєзнавчі штрихи з минулого і сьогодення / В. Мельник. – Луцьк: Волиньполіграф, 2010. – 40 с.
3. Основи заповідної справи: Навчальний посібник / Ю. М. Грищенко – Рівне: РДТУ, 2000. – 239 с.
4. Red Book of Ukraine
