= Shatsky (surname) =

Shatsky (masculine, Cyrillic: Шацкий) or Shatskaya (feminine, Cyrillic: Шацкая) is a Russian surname referring to people who arrived from the city Shatsk or from the river Shat. It may refer to the following notable people:

- Igor Shatsky (born 1989), Kazakhstani football goalkeeper
- Igor Shatsky, member of the Russian band Boa
- Nikolay Shatsky (1895–1960), Soviet geologist
- Nina Arkadyevna Shatskaya (born 1970), Russian singer
- Nina Sergeevna Shatskaya (1940–2021), Russian actress
- Stanislav Shatsky (1878–1934), Russian/Soviet educator, writer, and administrator
