= Berestia =

Historical region in Belarus

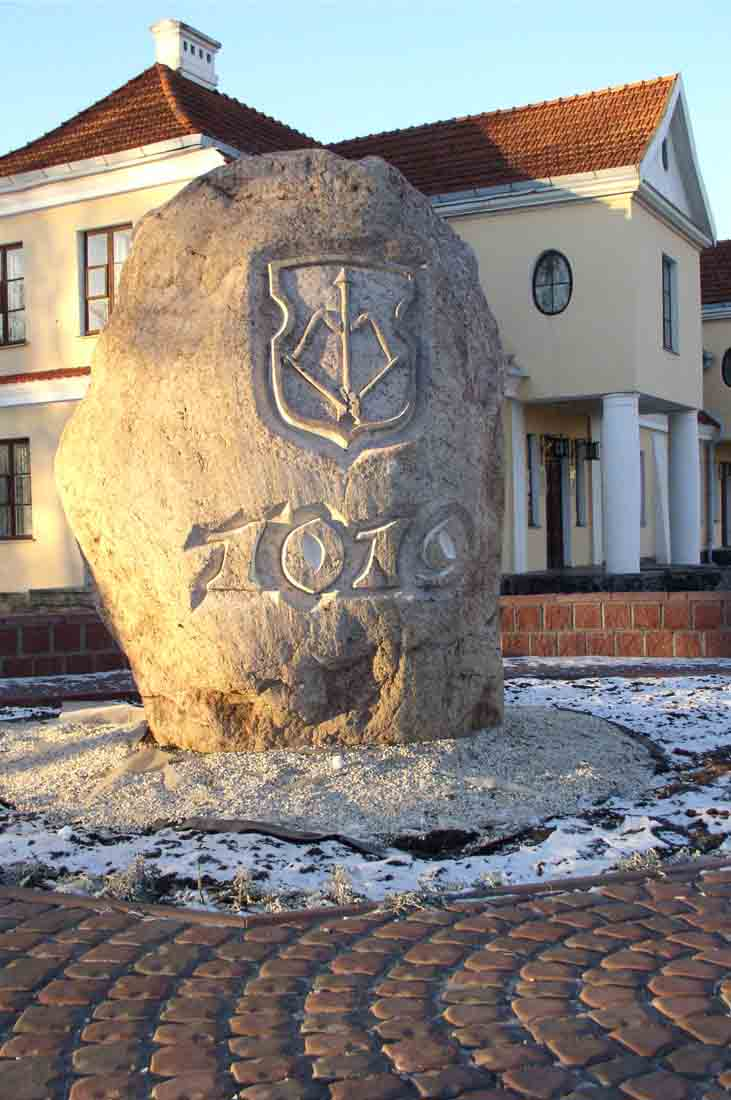
In 1019 Brest was first mentioned in chronicles as Berestye

Berestia (Belarusian: Берасцейшчына; Ukrainian: Берестейщина,Lithuanian: Berestje), is the part of Belarusian, and Ukrainian ethnic territory, bounded by the Bug River, Pripyat River, Yaselda River, and Narew (Narva) River, and a borderland between historical Podlachia (Polish: Podlasie) and the Land of Brest-Litovsk (Polish: ziemia brzeskolitewska) part of Polesia (Polish: Polesie).

Its main cities were Berestia, Bielsk, Drohiczyn, Kobryn and Kamyenyets.

Historically its lands were owned by East Slavic principalities, later by Polish and Lithuanian princes, by Grand Duchy of Lithuania and Crown of the Kingdom of Poland. After the Third Partition of Poland it became part of the Russian Partition. Eventually it has become part of Belarus.

== See also ==
- Shvarn
