= Shatsk, Volyn Oblast =

Rural locality in Volyn Oblast, Ukraine

Shatsk Шацьк (Ukrainian) Szack
- Rural settlement
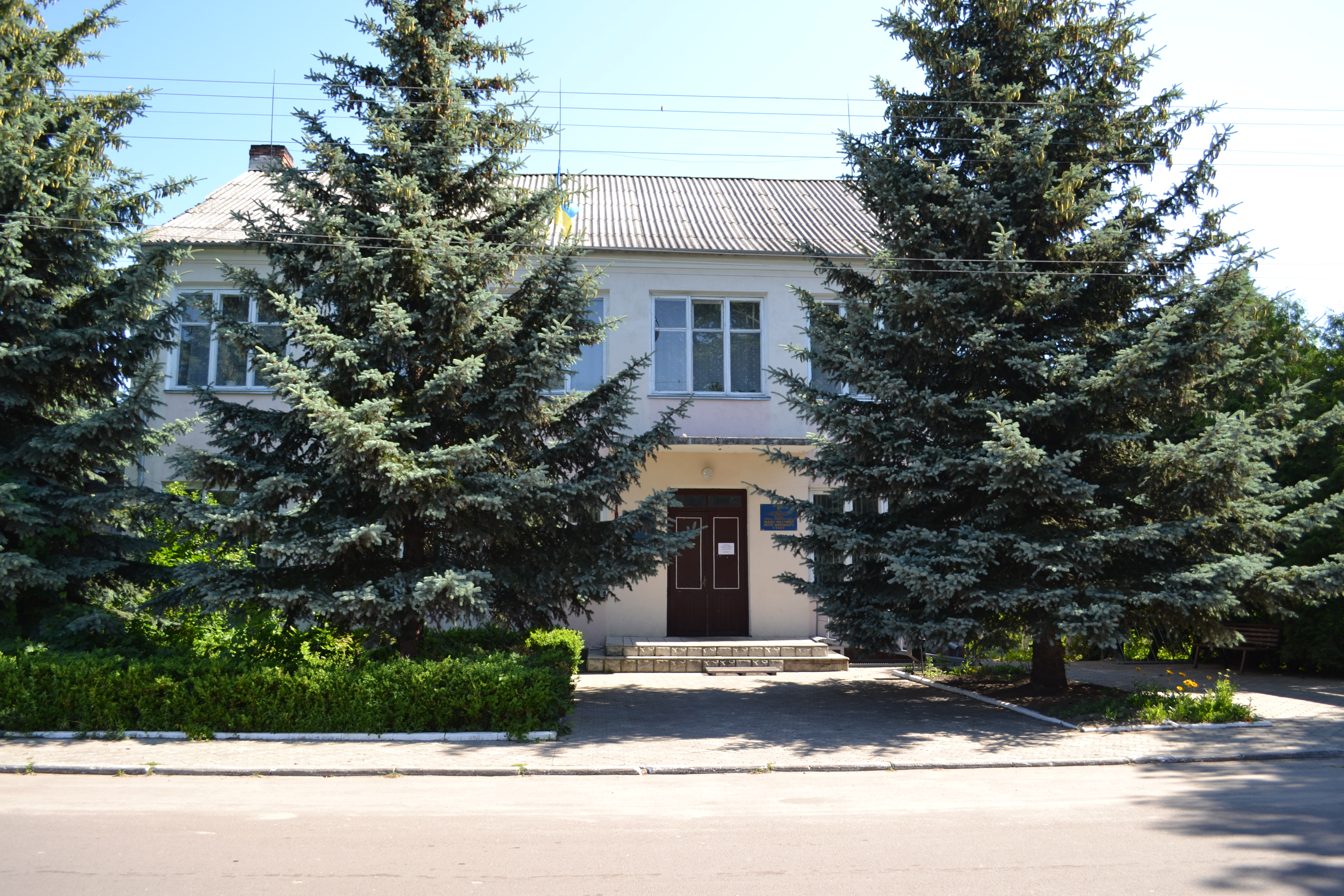
- Shatsk town hall

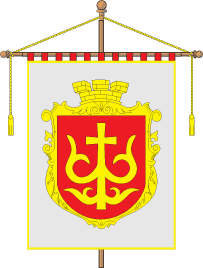
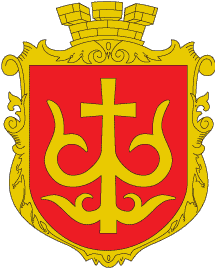
- Flag Coat of arms
- Interactive map of Shatsk
- Location within Volyn Oblast Location within Ukraine
- Coordinates: 51°29′16″N 23°55′47″E
- Country: Ukraine
- Oblast: Volyn Oblast
- Raion: Kovel Raion
- Hromada: Shatsk settlement hromada
- First mentioned: 1410

Area
  - Total: 5.75 km^{2} (2.22 sq mi)
- Elevation: 170 m (560 ft)

Population (2022)
  - Total: 5,249
  - Density: 913/km^{2} (2,360/sq mi)
- Time zone: UTC+2 (EET)
  - Summer (DST): UTC+3 (EEST)
- Postal code: 44000
- Area code: +380 3355

Shatsk (Ukrainian: Шацьк, pronounced [ˈʃɑtsʲk]; Polish: Szack; Yiddish: שאצק, romanized: Shatsk) is a rural settlement in Volyn Oblast, Kovel Raion, north-western Ukraine. It is located to the north-west of Kovel. Population: 5,249 (2022 estimate).

The village is situated in a picturesque area in the western part of Volyn Woodlands, surrounded by lakes, which are sometimes called Shatsky (Velyke Chorne, Svitiaz, Pulemetske, Luka, Liutsymer, Somynets, Karasynets, Ozertse).

In 2017, a postage stamp featuring the coat of arms of Shatsk was released by Ukrposhta.

== History ==
Historical affiliations

Crown of the Kingdom of Poland 1410–1569
Polish–Lithuanian Commonwealth 1569–1795
Russian Empire 1795–1917
Ukrainian People's Republic/Ukrainian State 1917-1919
Second Polish Republic 1919–1945
Soviet Union 1939–1941 (occupation)
Nazi Germany 1941–1944 (occupation)
Soviet Union 1944–1945 (occupation)
Soviet Union 1945–1991
Ukraine 1991–present

In Rus' sources, the town located in this area is mentioned twice, in 1255 and in 1287. In Polish sources the town is first mentioned in 1410. It had numerous voivodes such as the Dubasovy noble family from the 16th century to the end of the Russian Empire in 1917.

Following the German-Soviet invasion of Poland, which started World War II in September 1939, it was the battlefield of the Battle of Szack between Polish forces of general Wilhelm Orlik-Rueckemann and the Soviet 4th Army. Afterwards it was under Soviet occupation until 1941, and then German occupation until 1944. The Jewish population of the village at the beginning of the German occupation was probably around 300. Germans arrived in the village on June 30, 1941. In October 1941, the Jews of the town and surrounding villages were held captives in a ghetto. Shortly after, 319 Jews were shot by the Einsatzkommando and German police.

Until 2020 was an administrative centre of Shatsk Raion.

Until 26 January 2024, Shatsk was designated urban-type settlement. On this day, a new law entered into force which abolished this status, and Shatsk became a rural settlement.
