= List of villages in Volyn Oblast =

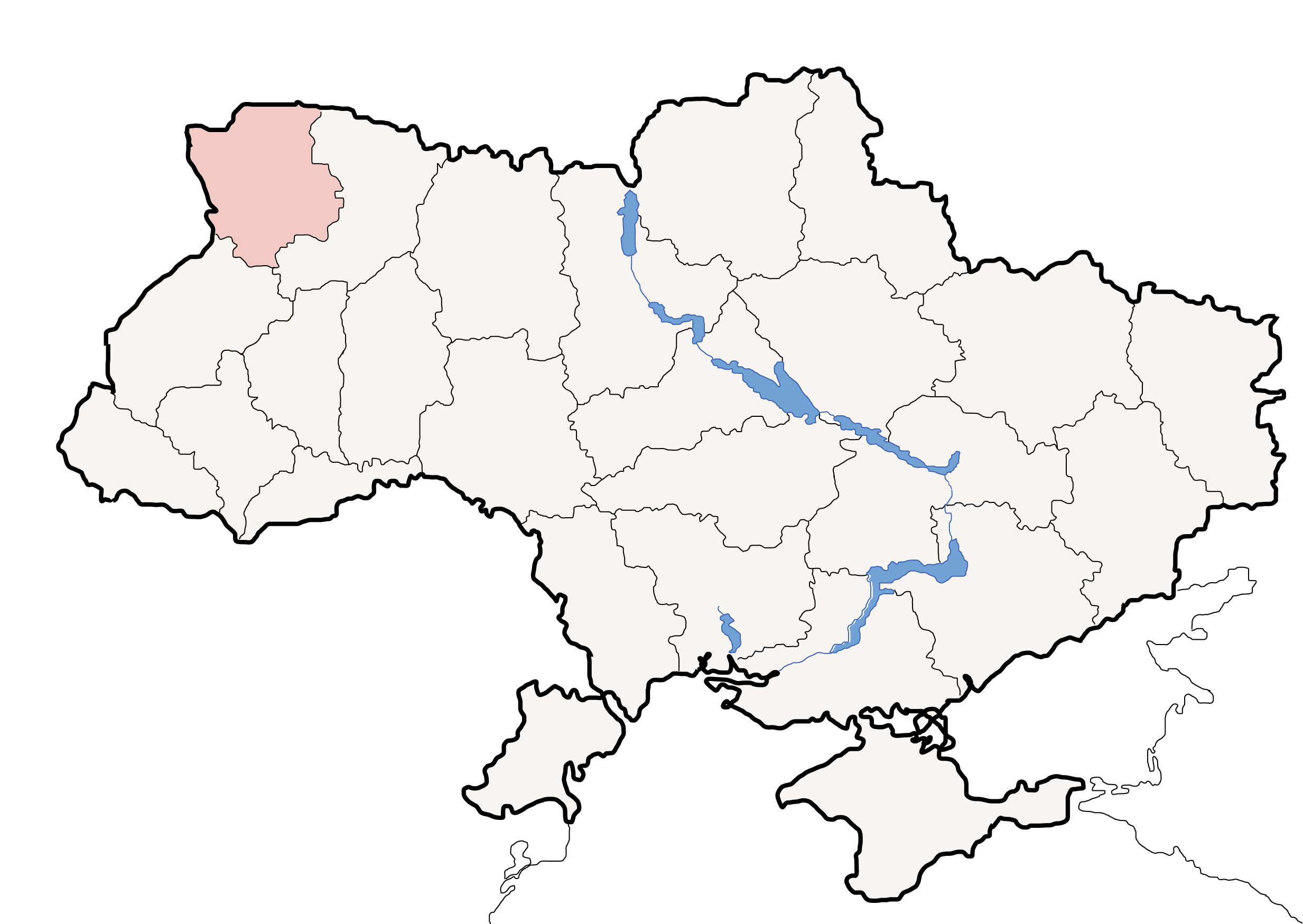
Map of the Volyn Oblast.

The following is a list of villages in Volyn Oblast in Ukraine.

== Kamin-Kashyrskyi Raion ==
- Berezna Volya
- Berezychi
- Borovne
- Bronytsia
- Busaky
- Byhiv
- Berezhnytsya
- Borovychi
- Budky
- Cherevaha
- Chersk
- Chetvertnya
- Chornyzh
- Dovzhytsya
- Guta Lisivska
- Haluziya
- Hodomychi
- Horaymivka
- Horodok
- Hraddya
- Hradysk
- Hruzyatyn
- Krynychne
- Kukly
- Kulykovychi
- Khryask
- Lyshnivka
- Lisove
- Nowa Ruda
- Novi Pidtsarevychi
- Novosilky
- Novoukrayinka
- Serhiv
- Sitnitsa
- Sofiyanivka
- Staryi Chortoryisk
- Starosillya
- Telchi
- Troyanivka
- Tsminy
- Velyka Vedmezhka
- Velyka Osnytsya
- Velyka Yablunka
- Vovchytsk
- Zahorivka
- Zamostya

== Kovel Raion ==
- Adamchuky
- Adamivka, Volyn Oblast\Adamivka
- Arsenovychi
- Babatsi
- Bachiv
- Baykivtsi
- Bereza
- Berezhtsi
- Bilashiv
- Bilychi
- Bilyn
- Birky
- Blazhenyk
- Borzova
- Byten
- Domanove
- Honchyy Brid
- Horodysche
- Hredky
- Hrushivka
- Hryv'yatky
- Kalynovnyk
- Kashivka
- Kozlynychi
- Kolodnytsya
- Kolodiazhne
- Kupychiv
- Kusnyscha
- Liubytiv
- Marianivka
- Mel'nytsia
- Myryn
- Myslyna
- Moshchena
- Radoshyn
- Rokytnytsya

== Lutsk Raion ==
- Antonivka
- Antonivka
- Bashlyky
- Bashova
- Bayiv
- Berestyane
- Berezhanka
- Bohunivka
- Bystrovytsya

== Volodymyr-Volynskyi Raion ==
- Ambukiv
- Bermeshiv
- Bilopil
- Bilychi
- Bortniv
