= Liuboml urban hromada =

Liuboml urban hromada Любомльська міська громада
- Hromada
- Interactive map of Liuboml urban hromada
- Country: Ukraine
- Oblast: Volyn
- Raion: Kovel
- Admin. center: Liuboml

Area
  - Total: 277 km^{2} (107 sq mi)

Population (2018)
  - Total: 16,076
  - Density: 58.0/km^{2} (150/sq mi)
- CATOTTG code: UA07060270000021892
- Settlements: 15
- Cities: 1
- Villages: 14
- Website: lubomlmisto.gov.ua/%7C

Liuboml urban territorial hromada (Ukrainian: Любомльська міська територіальна громада) is one of the hromadas of Ukraine, located in Kovel Raion in Volyn Oblast. Its administrative centre is the city of Liuboml.

The hromada has an area of 277 km^{2} (107 mi^{2}), as well as a population of 16,076 (as of 2018).

It was formed on August 4, 2017 by merging the Liuboml City Council and the Birky, Kusnyshcha, Pidhorodnie, Pochapy, Zapillia village councils of the Liuboml Raion.

Established in accordance with the order of the Cabinet of Ministers of Ukraine dated June 12, 2020 No. 708-r in the same composition.

On July 19, 2020, as a result of the administrative-territorial reform and liquidation of the Liuboml Raion, the hromada became part of the Kovel Raion.

== Composition ==
In addition to one city (Liuboml), the hromada contains 14 villages:

- Birky
- Boremshchyna
- Chornoplesy
- Horodnie
- Krasnovolia
- Kusnyshcha
- Lysniaky
- Pidhorodnie, Volyn Oblast
- Pochapy
- Skyby
- Vilka-Pidhorodnenska
- Vyhnanka, Volyn Oblast
- Zapillia
- Zastavie
