= Danylo Shumuk =

Ukrainian political activist

Danylo Shumuk Данило Шумук
- Born: 30 December 1914; Boremshchyna, Ukraine
- Died: 21 May 2004 (aged 89); Krasnoarmiisk, Ukraine
- Occupations: Poet, writer, and political activist
- Writing career
- Notable awards

Danylo Lavrentiyovych Shumuk (30 December 1914 – 21 May 2004) was a Ukrainian political activist who served a total of 42 years imprisoned by three different states, Second Polish Republic, Nazi Germany and Soviet Union.

== Living in the Second Polish Republic ==
In 1918, in what is now western Ukraine, the Ukrainian forces fought in the Polish-Ukrainian War, but the Ukrainians in Galicia were alienated after what they saw as a compromise in the Paris Peace Conference with Poland. The Ukrainian People's Republic delegation could not gain recognition at the Treaty of Versailles at the end of the World War. The representatives of the exiled government of the Ukrainian People's Republic fared poorly during Polish-Soviet War where they formed a late alliance with Poland and supported the latter's unsuccessful Kiev offensive. According to the Peace of Riga which ended the war, the combined territories of the Ukrainian and West Ukrainian People's Republics ended up split again between the Ukrainian SSR in the east and Poland in the west (Galicia and part of Volhynia).

The ethnic policies in the inter-war Poland were directed towards the Polonization and cultural assimilation of ethnic minorities. The tensions between Poles and Ukrainians increased in such a political environment.

Danylo began his struggle against Polish control and cultural assimilation of this area when he was 17 years old. In 1933, he was arrested by Polish police four times and detained for short terms. In 1934, he was arrested by the Polish police and held in jail in Kovel until he was sentenced in 1935 to an eight-year term for his role in the underground Communist Party of Western Ukraine. He served his term in a prison in Łomża. In 1938 under an amnesty for political prisoners, a third reduced his sentence. In the spring of the following year, he was transferred to a jail in Białystok, and on 24 May 1939, he was released.

== Living under Soviet Government ==
On 23 August 1939, the Soviet Union signed the Molotov–Ribbentrop Pact with Nazi Germany. The two governments announced the agreement merely as a non-aggression treaty. A secret appendix to the pact outlined a plan to divide Poland and Eastern Europe into Soviet and German spheres of influence.

Initially, the Soviet rule gained much support of the non-Polish population largely alienated by the nationalist policies of the Second Polish Republic. Much of the Ukrainian population initially welcomed the Soviet occupation, hoping for unification with the rest of Ukraine which fell to Bolshevik forces forming the Ukrainian SSR, a constituent republic of the Soviet Union in 1919.

During the round of repressions that followed the Soviet takeover, Danylo's older brother Anton, who worked for the Polish National Railway was arrested as an "enemy of the people."

On 15 May 1941, the Soviet authorities forced Danylo Shumuk to join a 'work camp' as a brother of an enemy of the people. Such treatment did not make Danylo lose faith in the benevolence of communists. When Germany attacked the Soviet Union, the work camps were transformed into Red Army Penal military units, which were usually given the most dangerous assignments and were considered expendable.

== Living under German Occupation ==
Danylo Shumuk, along with 600,000 other soldiers were captured by the Germans on the Kyiv front.

Danylo was kept in a POW camp in the town of Khorol in the Poltava Oblast. He described the German POW camp as a 'pit of death with prisoners dying like flies from hunger, exposure and epidemics.

In 1943, Danylo joined the Ukrainian Insurgent Army (UPA) understanding that Ukrainian struggle for independence was doomed, since the forces involved were unequal. A two-front war against Germany and the Soviet Union could not be won. He stated later that he 'considered it my duty to fight to the end.' In February 1945, Danylo Shumuk was captured by the NKVD and sentenced to death which was commuted to 20 years of hard labor.

== Living under Ukrainian SSR government ==
When he was 58 years old, he was arrested in January 1972 and sentenced in July 1972 to ten years in prison (hard labour) and five years in exile. He was later held in the special-regime unit of Perm-36 at Kuchino. In the 1970s, Shumuk shared a prison cell with Eduard Kuznetsov for five years.

When Andrei Sakharov accepted his Nobel Peace Prize in 1975 he said:

Here in this hall I should just like to mention the names of some of the internees I am acquainted with. As you were told yesterday, I would ask you to remember that all prisoners of conscience and all political prisoners in my country share with me the honor of the Nobel Prize. Here are some of the names that are known to me:

Plyushch, Bukovsky, Glusman, Moros, Maria Seminoova, Nadeshda Svetlishnaya, Stefania Shabatura, Irina Klynets-Stasiv, Irina Senik, Niyola Sadunaite, Anait Karapetian, Osipov, Kronid Ljubarsky, Shumuk, Vins, Rumachek, Khaustov, Superfin, Paulaitis, Simutis, Karavanskiy, Valery, Martshenko, Shuchevich, Pavlenkov, Chernoglas, Abanckin, Suslenskiy, Meshener, Svetlichny, Sofronov, Rode, Shakirov, Heifetz, Afanashev, Mo-Chun, Butman, Łukianenko, Ogurtsov, Sergeyenko, Antoniuk, Lupynos, Ruban, Plachotniuk, Kovgar, Belov, Igrunov, Soldatov, Miattik, Kierend, Jushkevich, Zdorovyy, Tovmajan, Shachverdjan, Zagrobian, Arikian, Markoshan, Arshakian, Mirauskas, Stus, Sverstiuk, Chandyba, Uboshko, Romaniuk, Vorobiov, Gel, Pronjuk, Gladko, Malchevsky, Grazis, Prishliak, Sapeliak, Kolynets, Suprei, Valdman, Demidov, Bernitshuk, Shovkovy, Gorbatiov, Berchov, Turik, Ziukauskas, Bolonkin, Lisovoi, Petrov, Chekalin, Gorodetsky, Chernovol, Balakonov, Bondar, Kalintchenko, Kolomin, Plumpa, Jaugelis, Fedoseyev, Osadchij, Budulak-Sharigin, Makarenko, Malkin, Shtern, Lazar Liubarsky, Feldman, Roitburt, Shkolnik, Murzienko, Fedorov, Dymshits, Kuznetsov, Mendelevich, Altman, Penson, Knoch, Vulf Zalmanson, Izrail Zalmanson, and many, many others.

== Living in exile to Canada ==
In 1987, having spent a total of 42 years in Soviet and Polish prisons, a Nazi POW Camp, Soviet penal colonies and a forced exile, Shumuk was allowed to leave the country. He moved to Toronto, Canada, where his memoirs Life sentence: memoirs of a Ukrainian political prisoner were published in English by the Canadian Institute of Ukrainian Studies (1984).

== Living in an independent Ukraine ==
On 28 November 2002 he returned to Ukraine, independent by then, and moved to Krasnoarmiysk of the Donetsk Oblast (province) in the east of Ukraine. He died there on 21 May 2004 at the age of 89.

== Awards ==
Order for Courage 1st class (November 8, 2006, posthumously).

== Works ==
By Danylo Shumuk:

- Life sentence: Memoirs of a Ukrainian political prisoner. Canadian Institute of Ukrainian Study, 1984, 401 pp., ISBN 978-0-920862-17-9.
- Za Skhidnim Obriyem (Beyond The Eastern Horizon). Paris, Baltimore: Smoloskyp, 1974, 447 pp.
