= Kusnyshcha =

Kusnyshcha Куснища
- Village
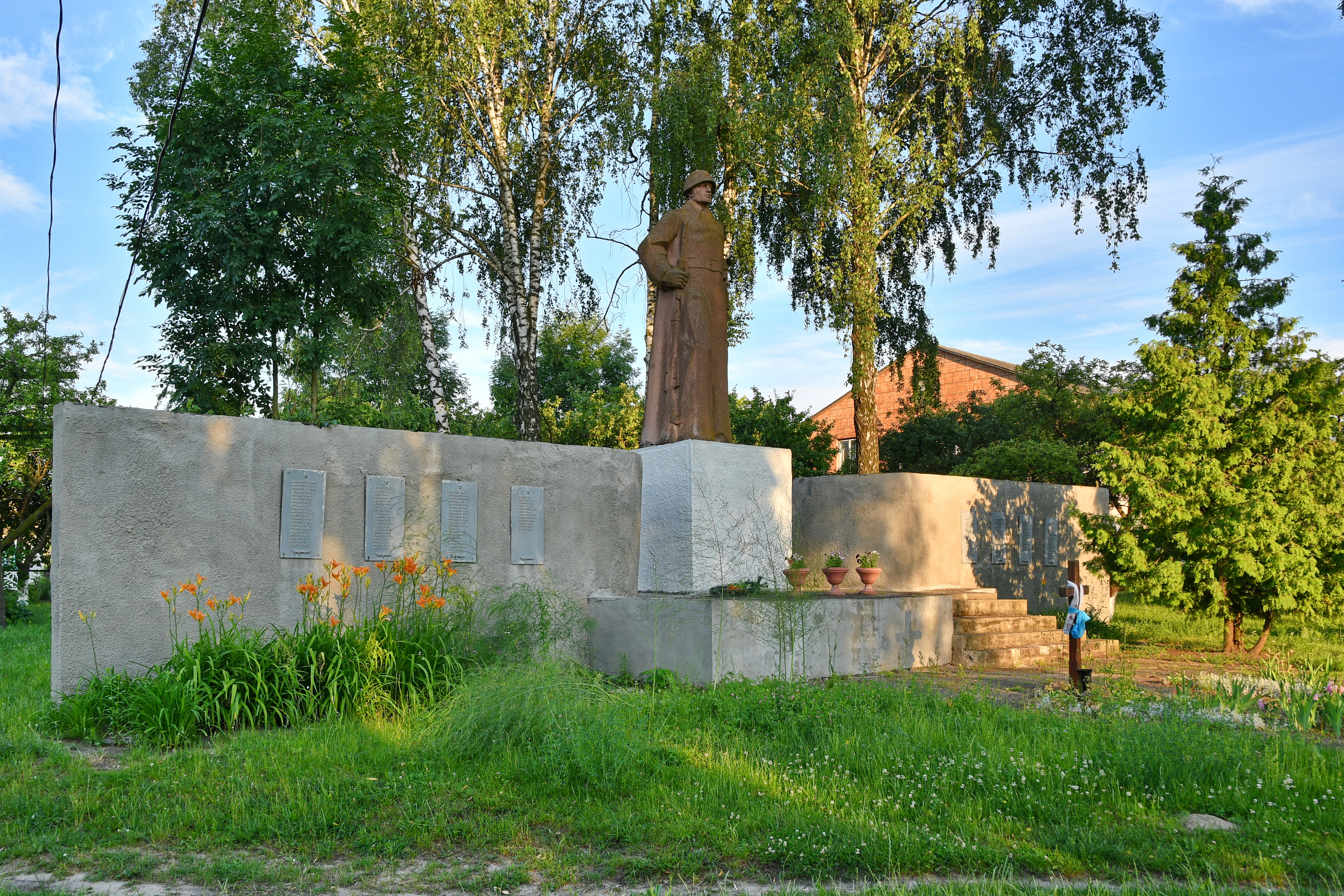

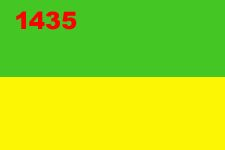
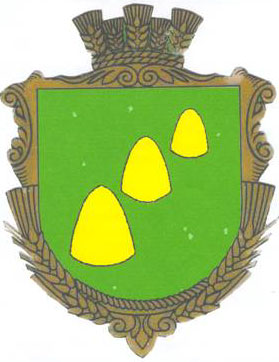
- Flag Coat of arms

- Location within Volyn Oblast
- Coordinates: 51°16′55″N 24°03′23″E
- Country: Ukraine
- Oblast: Volyn Oblast
- Raion: Kovel Raion
- Hromada: Liuboml urban hromada
- Established: 1510

Area
  - Total: 419 km^{2} (162 sq mi)
- Elevation /(average value of): 304 m (997 ft)

Population
  - Total: 1,800
  - Density: 47,971/km^{2} (124,240/sq mi)
- Time zone: UTC+2 (EET)
  - Summer (DST): UTC+3 (EEST)
- Postal code: 44326
- Area code: +380 3377
- Website: село Куснища ^{(Ukrainian)}

Kusnyshcha (Ukrainian: Куснища; Polish: Kuśniszcze) is a village in western Ukraine, in the Kovel Raion in Volyn Oblast, but was formerly administered within Liuboml Raion.
The population of the village is just about 1800 people and covers an area of 4,19 km^{2}. Local government is administered by Kusnyshcha Village Council.
Kusnyshcha located in the Liuboml Raion along the Highway T0308 Ukraine – Liuboml – Shatsk – Brest. It is situated in the 130 kilometres (81 mi) from the regional center Lutsk, 9 kilometres (5.6 mi) from the district center Liuboml and 125 kilometres (78 mi) from Brest.
The first mention of Kusnyshcha in written sources belong to 1564. But according to others sources, the settlement was founded back in 1510.
