= Holovne =

Rural settlement in Volyn Oblast, Ukraine

- Rural settlement
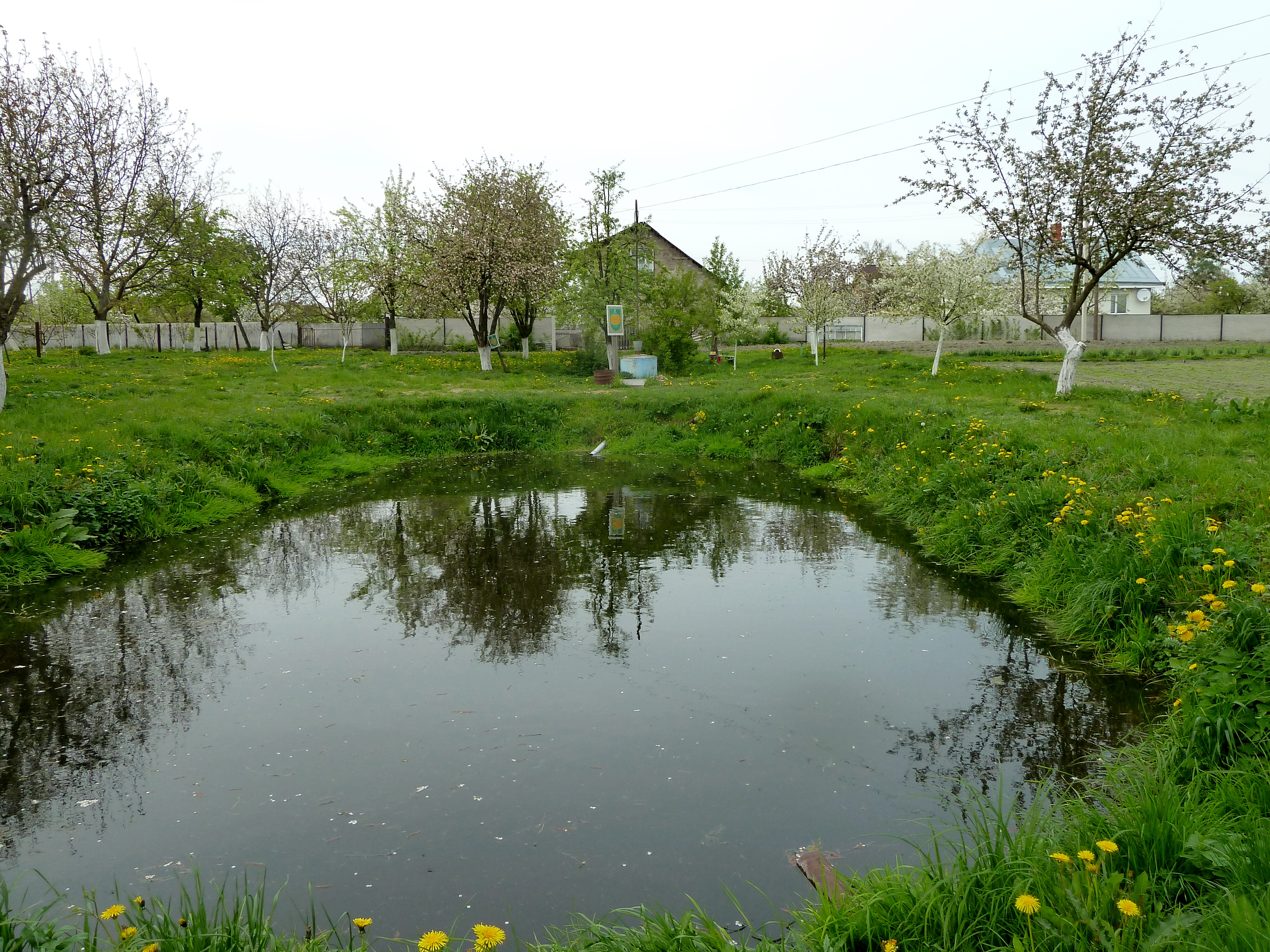

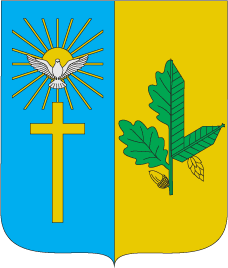
- Flag Coat of arms
- Interactive map of Holovne
- Location within Volyn Oblast Location within Ukraine
- Coordinates: 51°20′N 24°05′E
- Country: Ukraine
- Oblast: Volyn Oblast
- Raion: Kovel Raion
- Hromada: Holovne settlement hromada
- First mentioned: 1510

Area
  - Total: 6.03 km^{2} (2.33 sq mi)

Population (2022)
  - Total: 2,926
  - Density: 485/km^{2} (1,260/sq mi)
- Time zone: UTC+2 (EET)
  - Summer (DST): UTC+3 (EEST)

Holovne (Ukrainian: Головне; Polish: Hołowno) is a rural settlement in north-western Ukraine. It is located in Kovel Raion, Volyn Oblast, but was formerly administered within Liuboml Raion until 2020. The population is 2,926 (2022 estimate).

== History ==
Historical affiliations

Crown of the Kingdom of Poland 1510–1569
Polish–Lithuanian Commonwealth 1569–1795
Russian Empire 1795–1917
Ukrainian People's Republic 1917-1918, 1918-1919
Second Polish Republic 1919–1939
Soviet Union 1939–1941 (occupation)
Nazi Germany 1941–1944 (occupation)
Soviet Union 1944–1945 (occupation)
Soviet Union 1945–1991
Ukraine 1991–present

In the interwar period, it was the seat of a gmina, administratively located in the Luboml County in the Wołyń Voivodeship of Poland.

Following the German-Soviet invasion of Poland, which started World War II in September 1939, it was initially occupied by the Soviet Union, then by Nazi Germany from 1941, and then once again by the Soviets from 1944. In summer 1942, local Jews were murdered in mass executions perpetrated by an Einsatzgruppen of gendarmes and Ukrainian Auxiliary Police; 70 to 80 people were massacred.

Until 26 January 2024, Holovne was designated urban-type settlement. On this day, a new law entered into force which abolished this status, and Holovne became a rural settlement.

== Geography ==
The area of the village is 6.4 km^{2}. Holovne is located on the Polesian Lowland in Volyn Polissya. The relief of the village is flat, partly lowland, covered with pine and oak forests. The village is located at an altitude of 202 m on the Volyn Range.

The village is located 15 kilometers north of the district center and railway station Lyuboml, 132 km from the regional center and 35 km from Poland. An asphalt road runs through the village, which goes from the Lyuboml - Brest highway to Ratne. The village has a bus connection with Lyuboml, Lutsk, Volodymyr, Kovel.
