= Boremshchyna =

Coordinates: 51°14′33″N 24°12′47″E

Boremshchyna (Ukrainian: Боре́мщина) is a village in western Ukraine, in the Kovel Raion of Volyn Oblast, but was formerly administered within Liuboml Raion. As of 2012, the population was 62.

It was the birthplace of Danylo Shumuk (December 30, 1914), a member of the Ukrainian resistance during World War II.
