= Shakirov =

Shakirov (Russian: Шакиров) is a Russian masculine surname of Turkic origin, its feminine counterpart is Shakirova. It may refer to:

- Albina Shakirova (born 1987), Russian sports shooter
- Alexander Shakirov (born 1981), Russian rugby union player
- Elen Shakirova (born 1970), Russian basketball player
- Habiburrahman Shakirov, Tatar imam
- Mukhamed Shakirov (born 1933), Soviet long-distance runner
- Renata Shakirova, Russian ballet dancer
- Rinat Shakirov (born 1962), Kazakhstani pianist
- Sherzod Shakirov (born 1990), Kyrgyzstani football player
