= Luboml: My Heart Remembers =

- Directed by: Aaron Ziegelman
- Produced by: Eileen Douglas and Ron Steinman
- Release date: 2003
- Running time: 57 mins.
- Language: English

Luboml: My Heart Remembers is a 2003 documentary film produced by Eileen Douglas and Ron Steinman and funded by The Aaron Ziegelman Foundation. It compiles survivor interviews, archival photographs and film footage to reconstruct a sense of life in Luboml, one of the five thousand small shtetls (Jewish market towns) that were destroyed by the Holocaust. The film explores the vibrant Jewish life that – once central to European Jewry – is now forever lost. Made in 2003, Luboml: My Heart Remembers was called a "must see gem" by The Forward.

== Background ==
Luboml is situated 185 kilometres (115 mi) north of Lviv and 466 kilometres (290 mi) west of Kyiv, Ukraine, in the region of Eastern Europe known historically as Volhynia. It is located near the border with Belarus to its north, and Poland to the west. Because of its strategic location, Luboml had a long history of changing rule dating back to the 11th century. The territory of Volyn′ first belonged to Kievan Rus', then Poland, Lithuania, then Poland again, the USSR, and finally Ukraine.

Before the Nazi-Soviet invasion of Poland in September 1939 and the ensuing Holocaust, Luboml was a seat of the urban county in the Wołyń Voivodeship of the Second Polish Republic, with the highest percentage of Jews anywhere in Poland by 1931, exceeding 94% of the total population of over 3,300 inhabitants. Following the Nazi German attack on the Soviet positions in eastern Poland, all Jews of Luboml were killed in a mass shooting action on the outskirts of town in October 1942. The Luboml County was one of the epicenters of the massacres of Poles in Volhynia and Eastern Galicia by OUN-UPA several months later.

== Summary ==
The documentary exposes what the Nazis destroyed, resurrecting the past to depict a tightly-knit community. "Every place you went, people knew you," says an old man. The town's citizens worked together at the market square at the center of town, and they prayed together at the Great Synagogue. Like many shetlach that dotted Europe's landscapes, the people of Luboml shared both a religious tradition and sincere concern for each other. Every area of life, from work to holidays, from weddings to funerals, is described with colorful anecdotes and lively details, by the few who survived.

Of the 8,000 Jews who lived in and around Luboml only 51 survived the Holocaust, and today, not a single Jew lives there. Luboml as it once was – a simple peaceful society – has been uprooted, and before this film, only existed in memories.

Isolated from urban societies, Luboml was a quaint blend of emerging technology and old fashioned practices. Most citizens lived without refrigerators or running water. "We always had a cow and a garden in front," one survivor reflects.

But the citizens didn't think of themselves as primitive. They were proud of the new cinema house and electric lights in the town's streets that went up in the idyllic period before they knew what danger lay ahead. At night, after dinner, all the youths would slip out of their homes to go on long walks together, guided by those electric lights.

The documentary suggests that the Jewish population was so full of concern for one another that economics became somewhat irrelevant. When one family didn't have enough money to provide for themselves, neighbors would anonymously donate food. One survivor reflects, "We didn't know if we were rich or poor. Most people were in the same class," while another chuckles, "I could have been poor, but I didn't know it."

But Judaism, which had brought the townspeople together, became the reason for their destruction. The seeds of anti-Semitism in Luboml, which had played out in name-calling and child's teasing before the war, morphed into a serious threat. The Nazis entered the peaceful market town in tanks. Fear and helplessness over came the town. One survivor wrote, "Only if one's hands have been amputated can you understand at all what a Polish Jew is going through." A lucky few fled from Poland.

The Luboml documentary makes it clear that despite all the time that has passed since its destruction, those survivors who once lived in Luboml still remember their hometown dearly. "Every night, before I fall asleep" mourns one survivor who fled Poland during the war, "I am in Luboml. Still today, I am in Luboml."

The documentary serves as a detailed portrait of shtetl life that was destroyed. As one survivor recalls, "It was warm. It was beautiful. It was happy. All that is gone."

The documentary film is available in nine segments on YouTube. For a link to the online video and more, visit Luboml: My Hear Remembers at http://www.luboml.org/film.htm

== Filmmaker's interview ==
Filmmaker Aaron Ziegelman stated the following about his experience of Luboml, his inspiration to make its Jewish history known, and about the making of his documentary:

I was a teenager when I received the news that my whole family in Luboml was killed. My first reaction was 'I'm glad I got out in time' and I went about my teenage activities. It was only years later that I truly understood the enormity of the tragedy and I would say that I felt guilty about my own initial reaction. Of course, the reality was that the whole world was silent including most of the Jewish community in America.

I believe the first instinct came after seeing the movie Schindler's List. I wanted to know about the people in the camps before they were brought there. The idea was also reinforced when I started having the Luboml Book translated from Yiddish into English. I realized that this was a good starting point to tell the story of life before death and destruction.

The part of the film shot in Luboml was exciting and emotional. Reliving my childhood, going to places that I remembered and the scene at the mass grave was very profound. I kept thinking of my uncle and aunt and their two daughters. These girls were my playmates and I saw them everyday [sic?]. I imagined the terror they must have had being marched, all together, to their deaths. I refrained from voicing these feelings during the film because I knew that I would break down.

— Aaron Ziegelman
