= Sonia Orbuch =

American educator and resistance fighter

- Born: Sarah Shainwald; May 24, 1925; Luboml, Poland
- Died: September 30, 2018 (aged 93); Corte Madera, California, USA
- Other names: Sonia Shainwald Orbuch
- Known for: Jewish resistance fighter during the Second World War
- Notable work: Here, There Are No Sarahs (2009)

Sonia Shainwald Orbuch (born Sarah Shainwald, May 24, 1925 – September 30, 2018) was an American Holocaust educator. During the Second World War, she was a Jewish resistance fighter in eastern Poland.

Orbuch hid in the forests of Poland with her family during the Second World War. She joined a group of Soviet partisans, being renamed Sonia in case she was captured, and helped fight against the Germans. After the war, she returned home, where she met her future husband. After having a daughter in a refugee camp in Germany, the family eventually emigrated to the United States.

She spent the rest of life in public engagement, speaking about her experiences and in 2009, published her autobiography, Here, There Are No Sarahs: A Woman's Courageous Fight Against the Nazis and Her Bittersweet Fulfillment of the American Dream.

== Early life ==
Sarah Shainwald was born on May 24, 1925, and grew up in Luboml, then part of Poland but now of Ukraine, a town about 200 miles (320 km) south of Warsaw, Poland, that had an overwhelmingly Jewish population.

== Second World War ==
The Second World War broke out in 1939 when she was 14. The Molotov–Ribbentrop Pact divided Poland between Germany and the Soviet Union and her hometown came under Soviet control. Two years later, Operation Barbarossa forced the Jews of Luboml into a Jewish ghetto. Eight thousand Jews were affected, resulting in a scramble to self-defend, escape or hide. Unable to join her brother's partisan group due to her gender, Sonia hid in the forest with her parents and uncle during the winter of 1942 to 1943, keeping on the move and remaining hungry, cold, and unclean with lice.

In exchange for her uncle's knowledge of the area, Soviet partisans accepted them and renamed Sarah as Sonia to sound more Russian. Her son Paul called it her "nom de guerre". They lived in a forest camp and joined the partisans in acts of sabotage and resistance; she was drafted into the Red Army in 1944. During one of the family's periods of hiding, her mother died from typhus. While there, she learned how to give assistance to the wounded, despite having no previous medical training.

== Post-war ==
By May 1945 and the end of the war, she was back in Luboml working in a post office. That same year, she married former Polish cavalry officer Isaak Orbuch, whom she met in Chelm just after the war. Only 50 of the original 8,000 mostly Jewish residents of her town survived. After moving to a refugee camp in Zeilsheim near Frankfurt, Germany, where she gave birth to her daughter, the family moved to New York in February 1949, where Orbuch gave birth to her son Paul. She subsequently moved to Northern California with her family.

She recounted her experiences in her public talks and in 2009, published her autobiography Here, There Are No Sarahs: A Woman's Courageous Fight Against the Nazis and Her Bittersweet Fulfillment of the American Dream which was co-authored with Fred Rosenbaum.

Before she died, Orbuch reflected on the extent of Jewish resistance: "Was it possible for everybody to fight and get out to the forest and survive, no it wasn't. My brother did not survive, my uncle did not survive" but nevertheless she felt the "every person in the ghetto fought in their own way."

Orbuch died on September 30, 2018. Her obituaries were published around the world, including in the United States, Asia, and Europe.

== Publications ==
- Here, There Are No Sarahs: A Woman's Courageous Fight Against the Nazis and Her Bittersweet Fulfillment of the American Dream. Gatekeeper Press, Columbus, 2009. ISBN 978-1-57143-130-1 (With Fred Rosenbaum)
