= Moshchena =

Moshchena Мощена
- Village
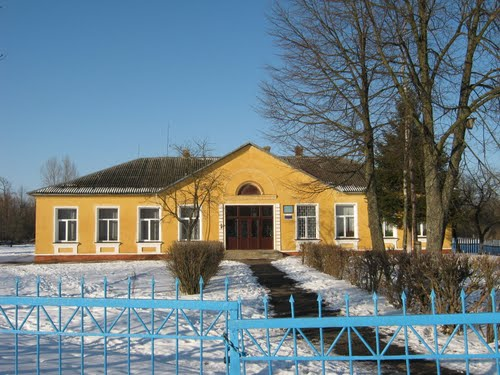
- Moshchena School

- Location of Moshchena
- Coordinates: 51°15′39″N 24°36′21″E
- Country: Ukraine
- Oblast: Volyn Oblast
- Raion: Kovel's'ky
- mentioned: 1543
- Elevation: 179 m (587 ft)

Population (2010)
  - Total: 581
- Time zone: UTC+2 (EET)
  - Summer (DST): UTC+3 (EEST)
- Postal code: UA 45030

Moshchena (Ukrainian: Мощена, Polish: Moszczana) is a village in Kovel Raion, Volyn Oblast, Ukraine. It has a population of 581 people.

The first mention of the village dates from 1543.
