= Kashivka =

Kashivka Кашівка
- Village
- Interactive map of Kashivka
- Coordinates: 51°10′3″N 25°19′8″E
- Country: Ukraine
- Oblast: Volyn Oblast
- Raion: Kovel Raion
- Hromada: Velytska rural hromada
- Established: 1631

Area
  - Total: 2.003 km^{2} (0.773 sq mi)
- Elevation: 166 m (545 ft)

Population (2020)
  - Total: 308
  - Density: 228.66/km^{2} (592.2/sq mi)
- Postal code: 45035
- Area code: 3352

Kashivka (Ukrainian: Кашівка) is a village (selo) in Ukraine, located in Velytska rural territorial hromada in Kovel Raion of Volyn Oblast. The population was 308 as of 2020.

== Geography ==
The Stokhid River flows through the village.

== History ==
In 1906, it was a townlet (mestechko) of Velytska volost in Kovel Uyezd of Volhynia Governorate. Distance from the uyezd town was 45 versts, from the volost 8 versts. There were 115 households and 669 residents.

- 6 February 1631. The townlet of Koshovhorod (modern Kashivka), owned by nobleman Jan Koshovsky, receives a privilege for Magdeburg rights from King Sigismund III Vasa.
- June 1941. Battles took place involving troops of the 22nd Mechanized Corps (41st Tank and 215th Motorized Divisions) together with units of the 15th Rifle Corps, 1st Armored Train Division and 289th Howitzer Artillery Regiment of the Reserve of the Supreme High Command after withdrawing from the Kovel area, which held defense on the Malyi Obzyr, Berezhnytsia, Kashivka line.

On 19 July 2020, as a result of the administrative-territorial reform and the liquidation of Kovel Raion (1940–2020), the village became part of the newly formed Kovel Raion.

== In literature ==
Kashivka became the central setting of the autobiographical memoir novel "Tale of a Vanished Land: Memories of a Childhood in Old Russia" published in 1930 in Boston.

In the book, the village is referred to as Kashoffka, reflecting the author's spelling (an alternative transliteration of the name)

The author of the book is Harry Burrows, a native of Kashivka. The work describes in detail the life of Kashivka residents in the late 19th century, the nature of the Stokhid region, local legends and traditions. Burrows describes Kashivka as an isolated, almost mythical world where life remained unchanged for generations until it was destroyed by the wars and upheavals of the 20th century. The book is illustrated with engravings by Howard Simon depicting village life. Harry E. Burroughs (born Hersh Baraznik, 1887 – 1968) was an American lawyer, philanthropist and writer. Born in Kashivka, he emigrated to the United States at the age of 13. He founded the well-known in Boston "Newsboys Foundation."

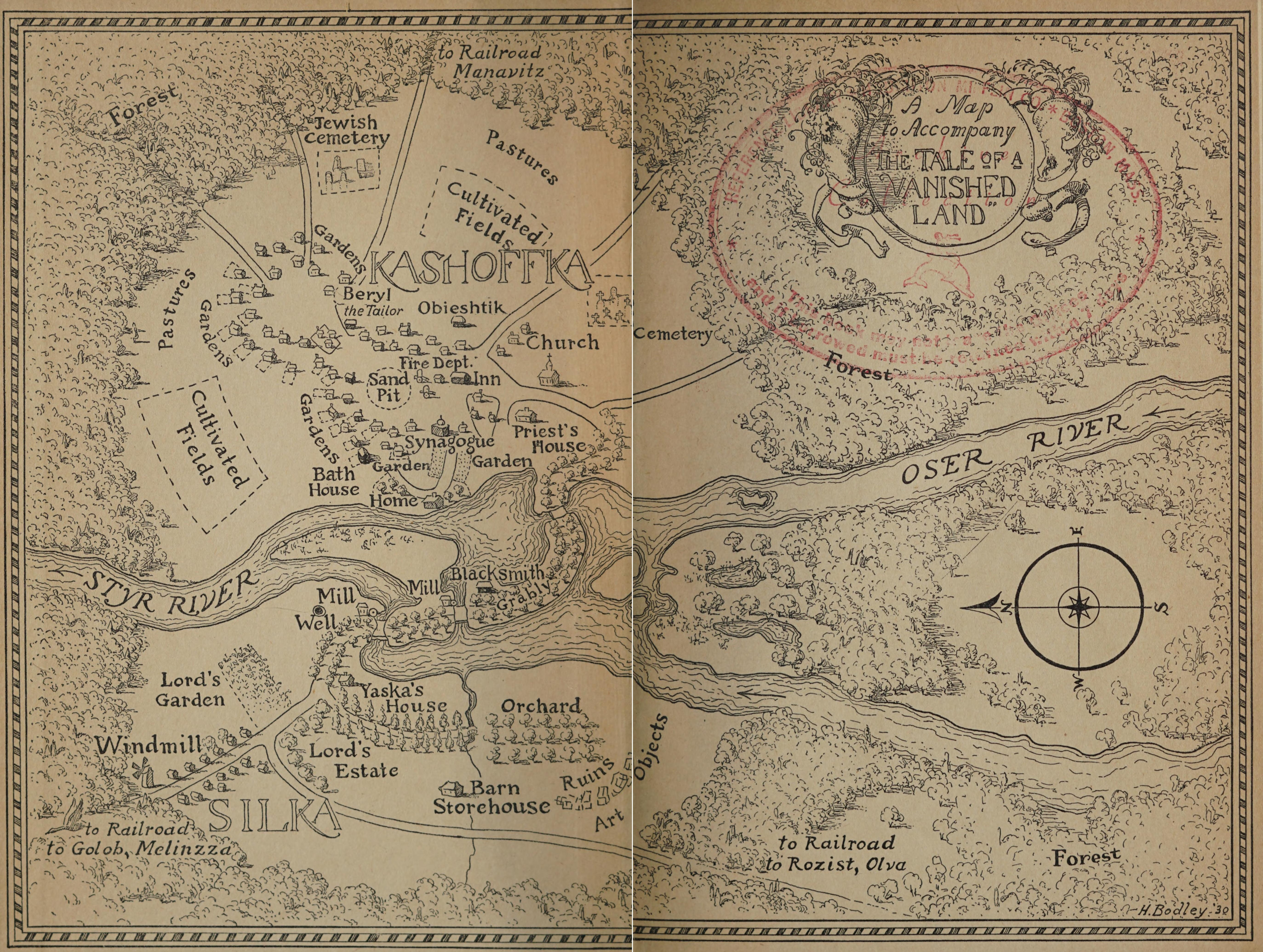
Map of Kashivka village from "Tale of a Vanished Land: Memories of a Childhood in Old Russia"

== Demographics ==
According to the 1989 census of the Ukrainian SSR, the population of the village was 489 people, including 242 men and 247 women.

According to the 2001 census of Ukraine, 458 people lived in the village.
