= Rinat Shakirov =

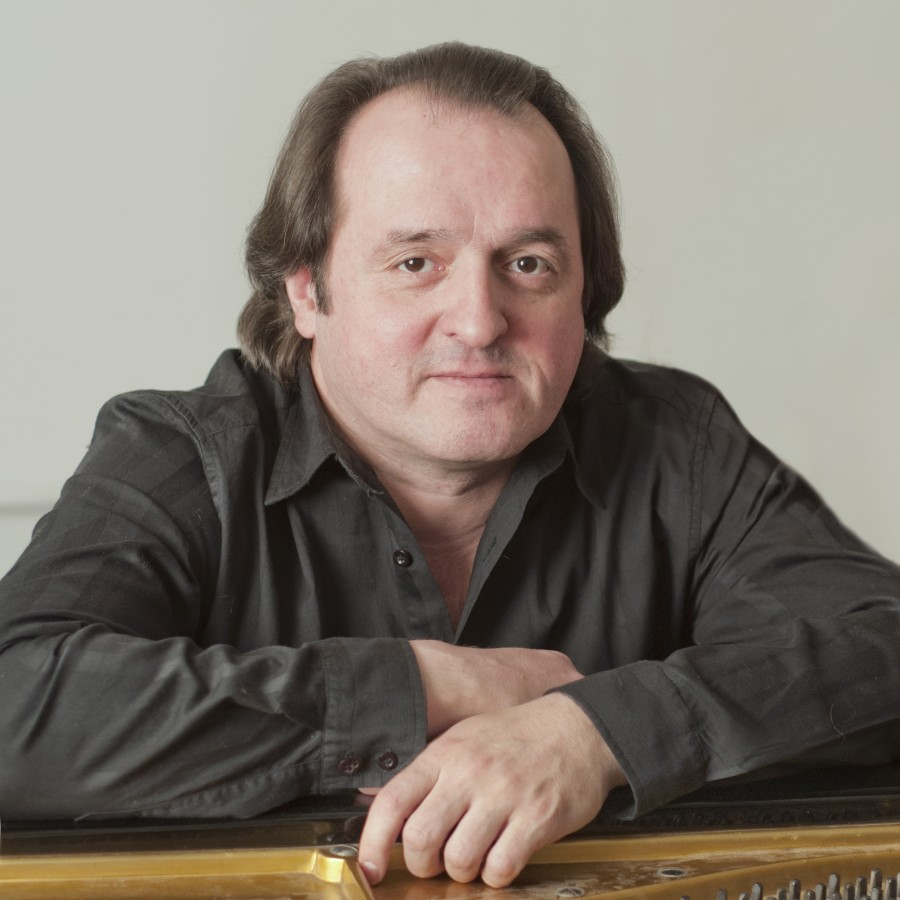
photo by M.Lerner

Rinat Shakirov (Russian: Ринат Шакиров; born 1962 in Karaganda, Kazakhstan) is a Kazakh pianist.

== Education ==
Shakirov graduated from the Physics & Mathematics School in 1979 and entered the Leningrad Polytechnic Institute's Department of Nuclear Physics while dabbling in music.

Shakirov decided to become a musician in 1981. He studied at the music school with the famous piano teacher Alfred Rippe (working in Marburg, Germany).

He repeatedly won regional piano competitions during his studies. (Alma-Ata, Frunze).

He continued his studies at the St. Petersburg Conservatory with Stanislav Igolinsky and at the Moscow Conservatory with Lev Vlasenko from 1985 to 1992.

In 1994 he took part in the X^{th} International Competition after P.I. Tchaikovsky, Moscow (I, II rounds).

== Career ==
On graduating from the conservatory, Shakirov was engaged in concert and teaching activities. His concert programs were based on Bach, Schubert, Rachmaninov, Tchaikovsky, Chopin, Debussy, Ravel, and Gershwin. His works have been widely recognized by the public and critics. The music of contemporary composers—Messiaen, Stravinsky, Hindemith, Ligeti, Satie, Bartok, Copland—also makes up a significant part of Shakirov's repertoire, as does the music of Tatarstan composers—Yarullin, Yakhin, Kalimullin, Monasypov, and Enikeev, among others.

Shakirov is the author of the piano suite based on Farit Yarullin's Shurale ballet, published in Moscow in 2005 and 2011 in the Composer Publishing House.

Shakirov has recorded nine discs and records of piano classics in studios in Russia, Tatarstan and Kazakhstan.

Since 1990, Shakirov has performed more than 600 solo concerts in Russia, Italy, Finland, France, Germany, Sweden, Belgium, Switzerland. He has performed in the halls of Moscow, St. Petersburg, Kazan, Voronezh, Orel, Astana, Almaty, Milan, Paris, Stockholm, Helsinki, Zurich, Basel, Kassel, Stuttgart, and Brussels.

Shakirov works with many orchestras and conductors, including Fuat Mansurov, Ravil Martynov, Alexander Kantorov, Mikhail Sinkevich, Dmitry Khokhlov, Andrei Anikhanov, Fabio Mastrangelo, Sergei Stadler, Alexander Sladkovsky, Igor Manasherov and Rustem Abyazov.

Shakirov has taken part in international music festivals such as Geteborg Art Sound, Europe-Asia, St. Petersburg Musical Spring, Other Space, Japanese Spring in St. Petersburg, Panorama of Russian Music, Moscow Autumn, Names of St. Petersburg and many others.

He has been an award panelist in various international piano competitions.
