= Borzov =

Borzov (Russian: Борзов) is a Slavic masculine surname. Its feminine counterpart is Borzova. It may refer to:

- Nike Borzov (born 1972), Russian singer and musician
- Sergey Borzov (born 1981), Uzbekistani sprint canoer
- Valeriy Borzov (born 1949), Soviet sprinter
- Irina Borzova (born 1987), Russian acrobatic gymnast
- Yuliya Borzova (born 1981), Uzbekistani sprint canoer, sister of Sergey Borzov
