= Liubytiv =

Liubytiv Любитів
- Village
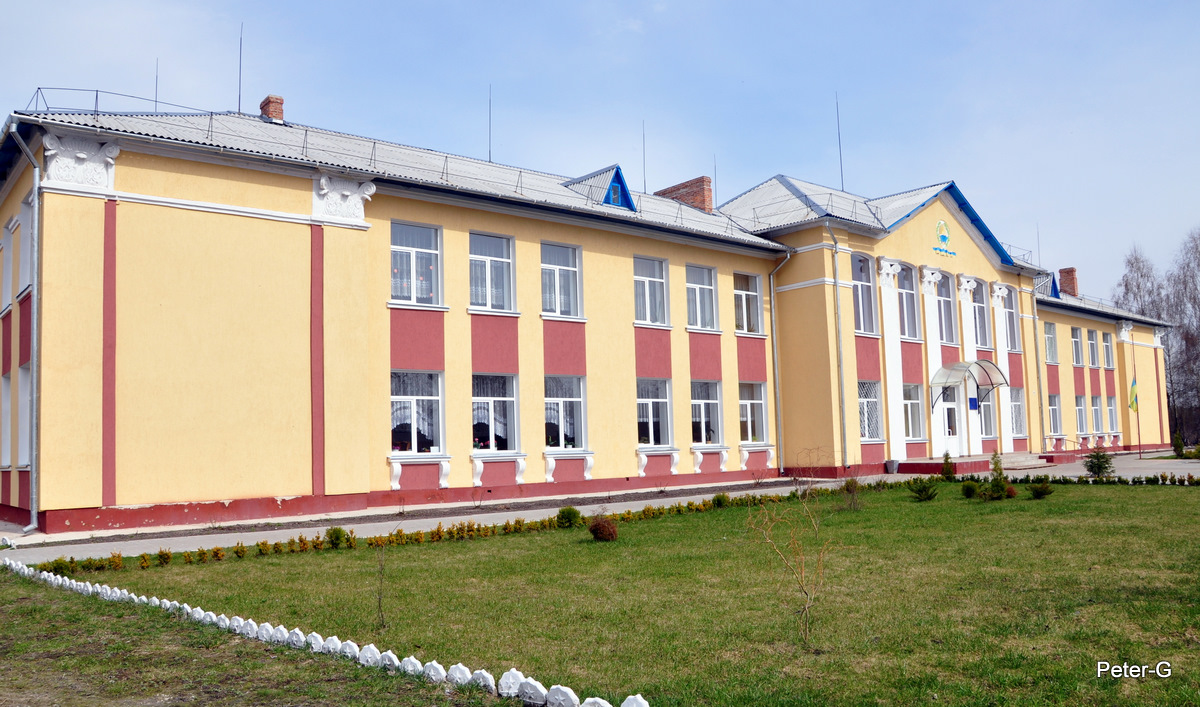
- Liubytiv Lesya Ukrainka School

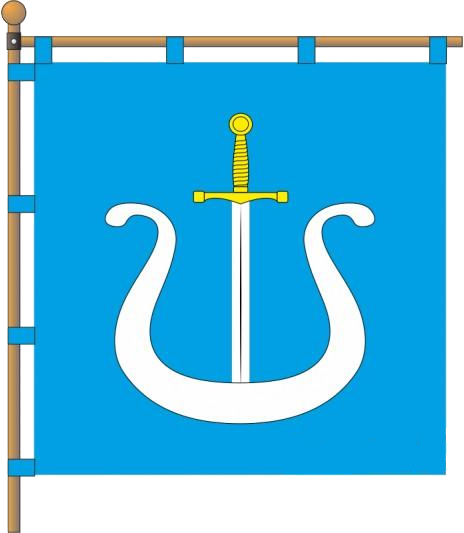
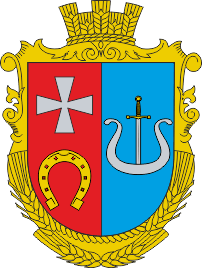
- Flag Coat of arms

- Location of Liubytiv
- Coordinates: 51°8′55″N 24°49′40″E
- Country: Ukraine
- Oblast: Volyn Oblast
- Raion: Kovel Raion
- mentioned: 1545

Government
  - Mayor: Pavlov V.I.
- Elevation: 182 m (597 ft)

Population (2001)
  - Total: 1,436
- Time zone: UTC+2 (EET)
  - Summer (DST): UTC+3 (EEST)
- Postal code: UA 45063
- Area code: +380 3352-97

Liubytiv (Ukrainian: Любитів, Polish: Lubitów) is a village in Kovel Raion, Volyn Oblast, Ukraine. It has a population of 1,436 people (2001).

The first mention of the village dates from 1545.
