= Liuboml Raion =

Former subdivision of Volyn Oblast, Ukraine

Liuboml Raion Любомльський район
- Raion
- Flag Coat of arms

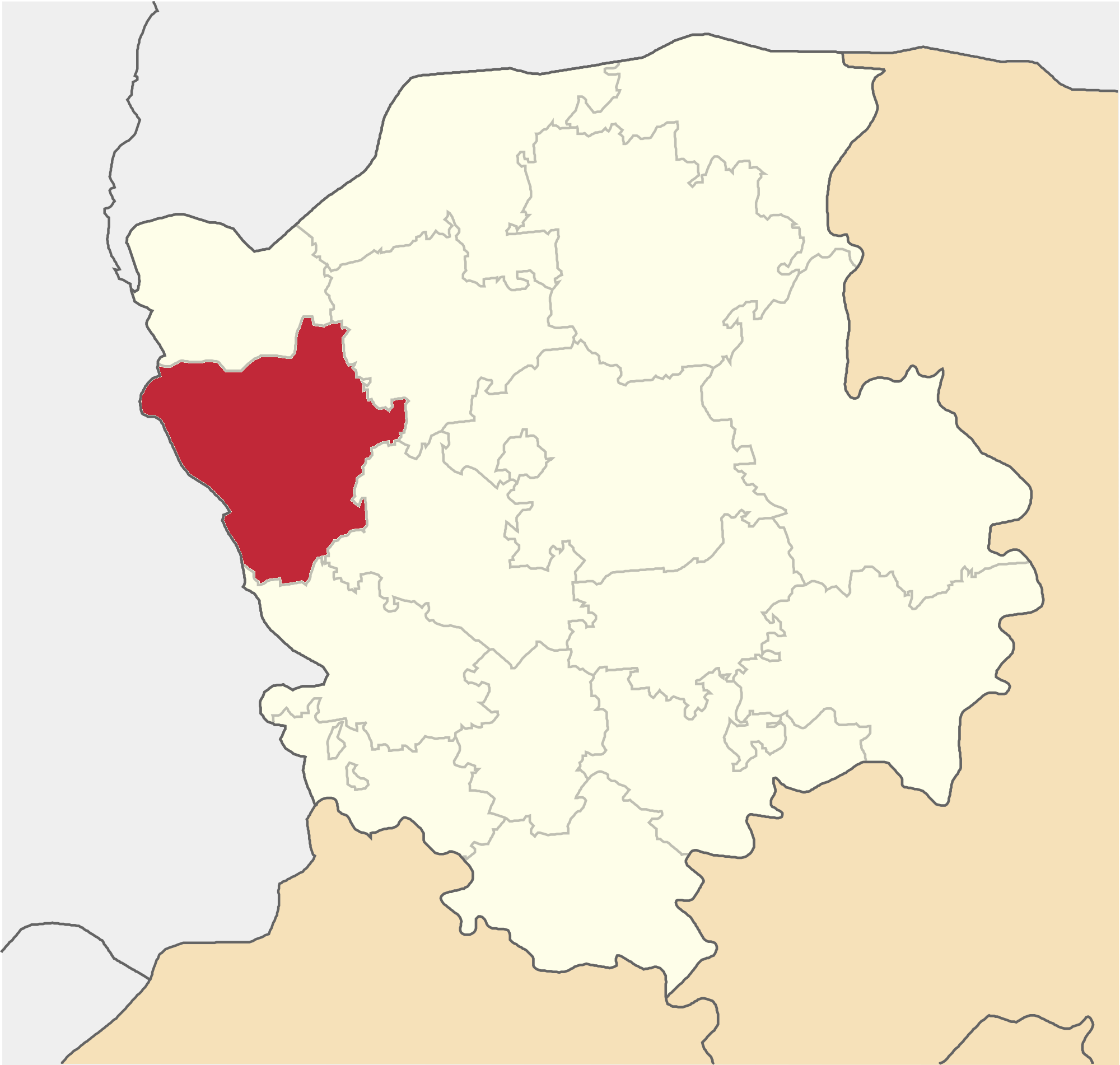
- Coordinates: 51°24′00″N 24°06′00″E
- Country: Ukraine
- Oblast: Volyn Oblast
- Established: 1939
- Disestablished: 18 July 2020
- Admin. center: Liuboml
- Subdivisions: List: — city councils; — settlement councils; — rural councils; Number of localities: — cities; — urban-type settlements; 68 — villages; — rural settlements

Area
  - Total: 1,481 km^{2} (572 sq mi)

Population (2020)
  - Total: 38,578
  - Density: 26.05/km^{2} (67.47/sq mi)
- Time zone: UTC+02:00 (EET)
  - Summer (DST): UTC+03:00 (EEST)
- Area code: 380-3377
- Website: http://www.lbmadm.gov.ua/ Lyubomlskyi Raion

Liuboml Raion (Ukrainian: Любомльський район) was a raion in Volyn Oblast in western Ukraine. Its administrative center was the town of Liuboml. The raion was abolished and its territory was merged into Kovel Raion on 18 July 2020 as part of the administrative reform of Ukraine, which reduced the number of raions of Volyn Oblast to four. The last estimate of the raion population was 38,578 (2020 est.)

== See also ==
- Administrative divisions of Volyn Oblast
- Holovne
