= Liuboml =

City in Volyn Oblast, Ukraine

Liuboml Любомль
- City
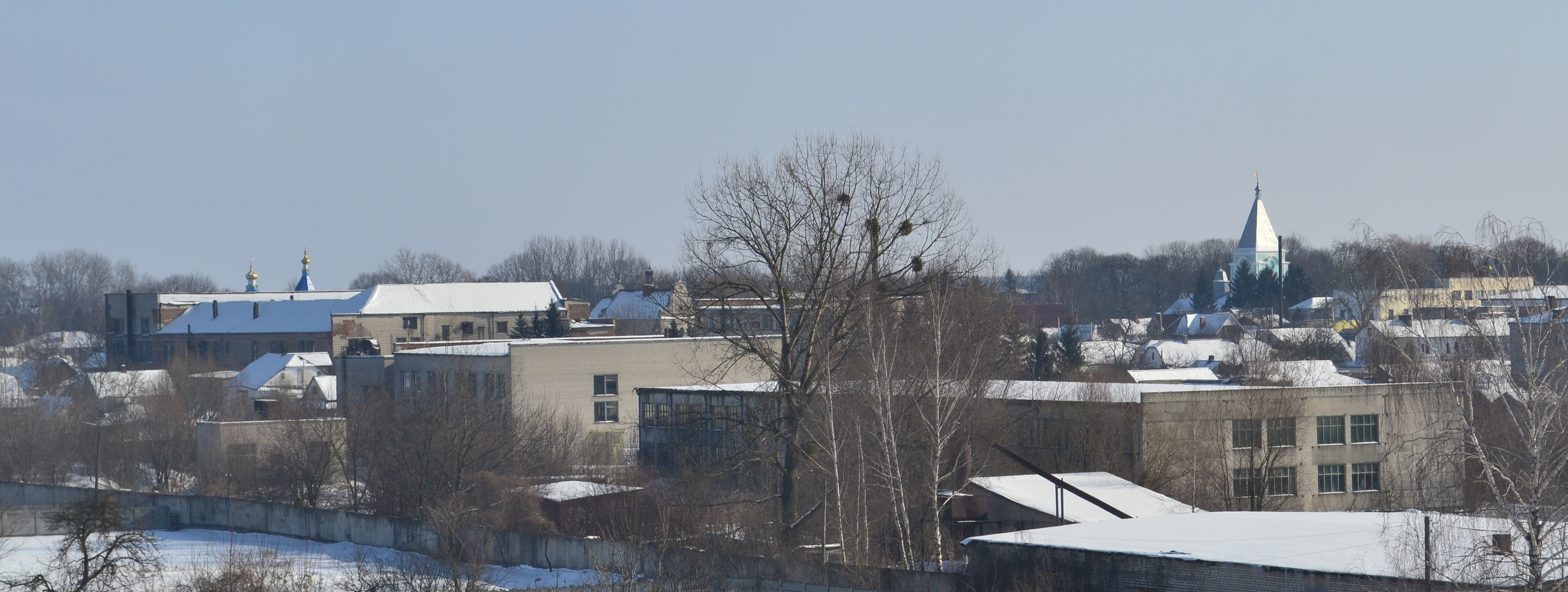
- Skyline

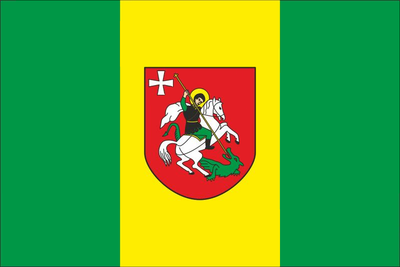
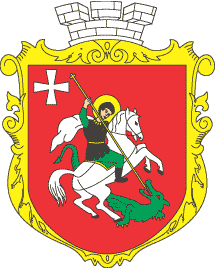
- Flag Coat of arms
- Interactive map of Liuboml
- Location within Volyn Oblast Location within Ukraine
- Coordinates: 51°13′25″N 24°01′58″E
- Country: Ukraine
- Oblast: Volyn Oblast
- Raion: Kovel Raion
- Hromada: Liuboml urban hromada

Government
  - Mayor: Roman Jushchuk
- Elevation: 187 m (614 ft)

Population (2022)
  - Total: 10,295

Liuboml (Russian and Ukrainian: Любомль, Ukrainian pronunciation: [ˈlʲubomlʲ]; Polish and German: Luboml; Yiddish: ליבעוונע, romanized: Libevne) is a city in Kovel Raion, Volyn Oblast, western Ukraine. It is located close to the border with Poland. It serves as the administrative center of Liuboml urban hromada. Population: 10,295 (2022 estimate).

== Overview ==
Liuboml is situated 200 miles (320 km) southeast of Warsaw and 290 miles (470 km) west of Kyiv, in a historic region known as Volhynia; not far from the border with Belarus to the north, and Poland to the west. Because of its strategic location at the crossroads of Central and Eastern Europe, Liuboml had a long history of changing rule, dating back to the 11th century. The territory of Volhynia first belonged to Kyivan Rus', then to the Kingdom of Poland, the Polish–Lithuanian Commonwealth, the Russian Empire, interwar Poland, the USSR, and finally to sovereign Ukraine.

== History ==
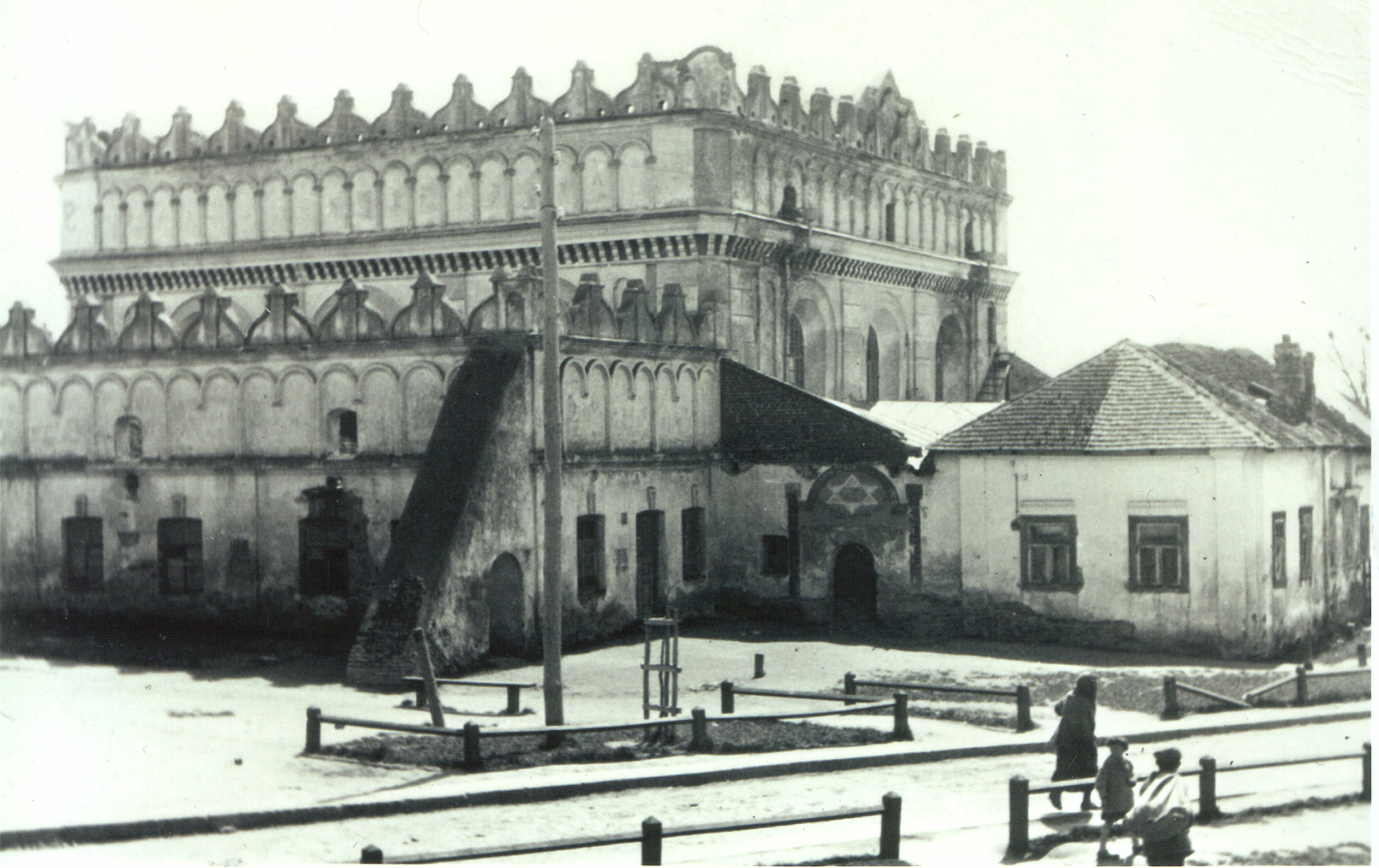
Liuboml Synagogue before the Holocaust, historic photograph

The settlement was first mentioned in written documents from the 13th century. During that time it was a centre of Volodymyr Principality and served as the favourite residence of prince Vladimir Vasilkovich.

The 4th Infantry Regiment of the Polish Crown Army was stationed in Luboml in 1794.

During the Third Partition of Poland in 1795, Luboml was annexed by Imperial Russia, within which it was located in Vladimir-Volynsky Uyezd of Volhynia Governorate until the Russian Revolution of 1917. From 1921 to September 1939 it was an administrative centre of an urban county in the Wołyń Voivodeship of Poland.

A local newspaper was published in Liuboml since 1939.

Before the ensuing Holocaust, Luboml was a town with the highest percentage of Jews anywhere in the Second Polish Republic. By 1931 its Jewish population exceeded 94% of the total population of over 3,300 people.

In Yiddish, the town was called Libivne. During World War II, Liuboml was occupied twice. It remained under the German occupation from 25 June 1941 until 19 July 1944 in the years following the anti-Soviet Operation Barbarossa. It was administered as a part of the Nazi German Reichskommissariat Ukraine. The entire Jewish community of Liuboml was annihilated in a mass shooting action conducted in 1942 on the outskirts of town in the deadliest phase of the Holocaust. The town's Jews along with refugees from western Poland estimated at around 4,500 people, were taken by the German Einsatzgruppen aided by the local Ukrainian collaborators and Auxiliary Police to nearby pits and shot. There were 51 known survivors from the virtually eradicated town. Liuboml was repopulated during the postwar repatriations.

In 1959 it had 5,600 inhabitants. It served as a centre of food and forest industries. In January 1989 the population of Liuboml reached 10,124 people.

== Historical and Cultural Heritage Monuments ==
The town's landmarks include St. George's Church, built in the 16th century in place of a 13th-century Orthodox church which previously occupied the site, and the Trinity Church, which goes back to 1412, but was subsequently rebuilt, with a belfry from 1640. Prior to the Second World War, the grand synagogue was a dominant landmark as well, before its meticulous destruction.

== Demographics ==
As of the 2001 Ukrainian census, the city counted a population of 10,270 inhabitants. The ethnic and linguitic composition of the population at the time of the census was as follows:

Ethnic groups in Liuboml
	percent
Ukrainians	97.71%
Russians	1.73%
Belarusians	0.26%
others	0.30%

Native languages in Liuboml
	percent
Ukrainian	98.1%
Russian	1.7%
Belarusian	0.1%
others	0.1%

== Notable people ==
- Natalia Uzhviy, actress
- Sonia Orbuch Jewish resistance fighter

== Gallery ==
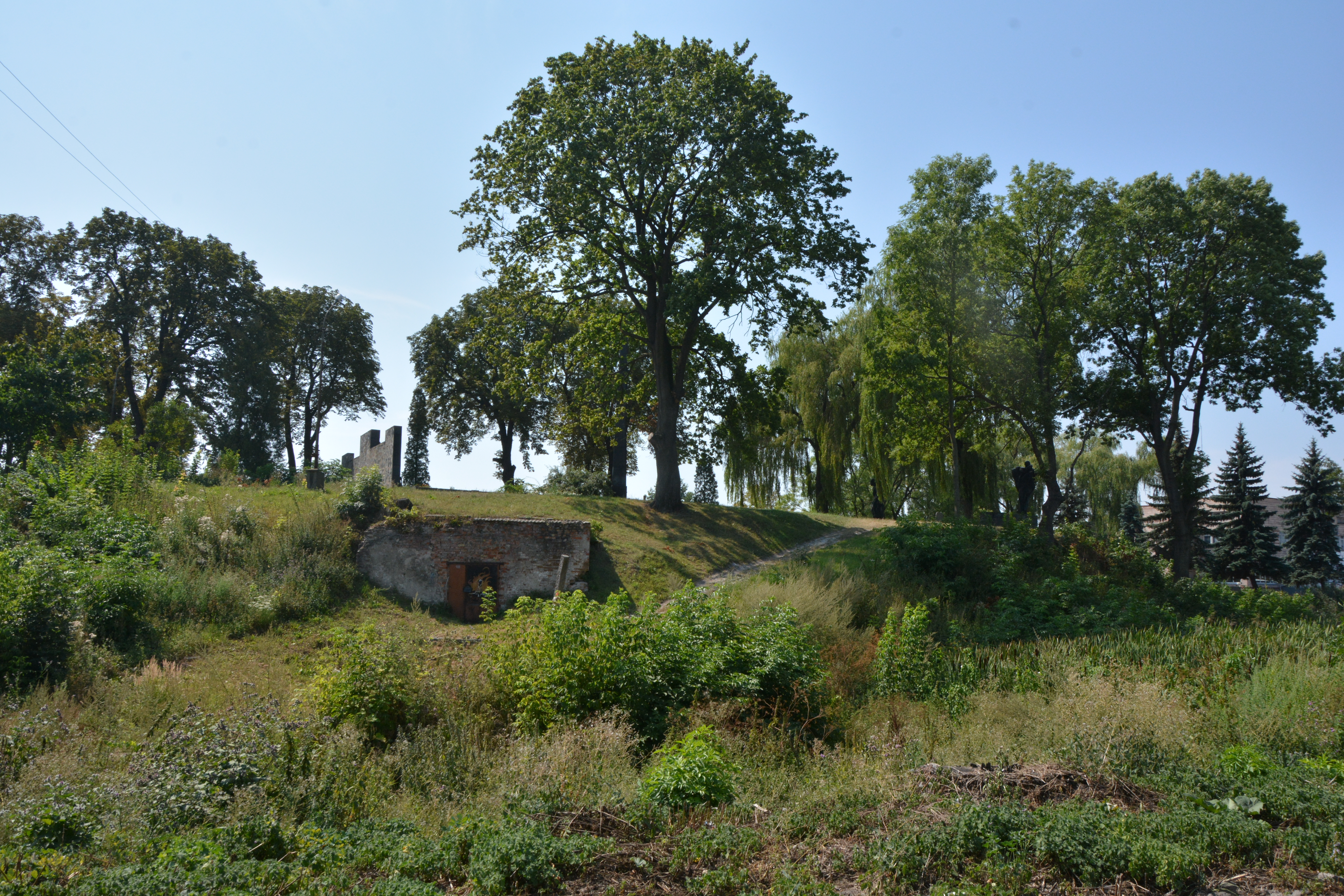
Site of Ancient Settlement with the castle hill and fosse (“Fossia”) in the city centre, 13th–13th centuries

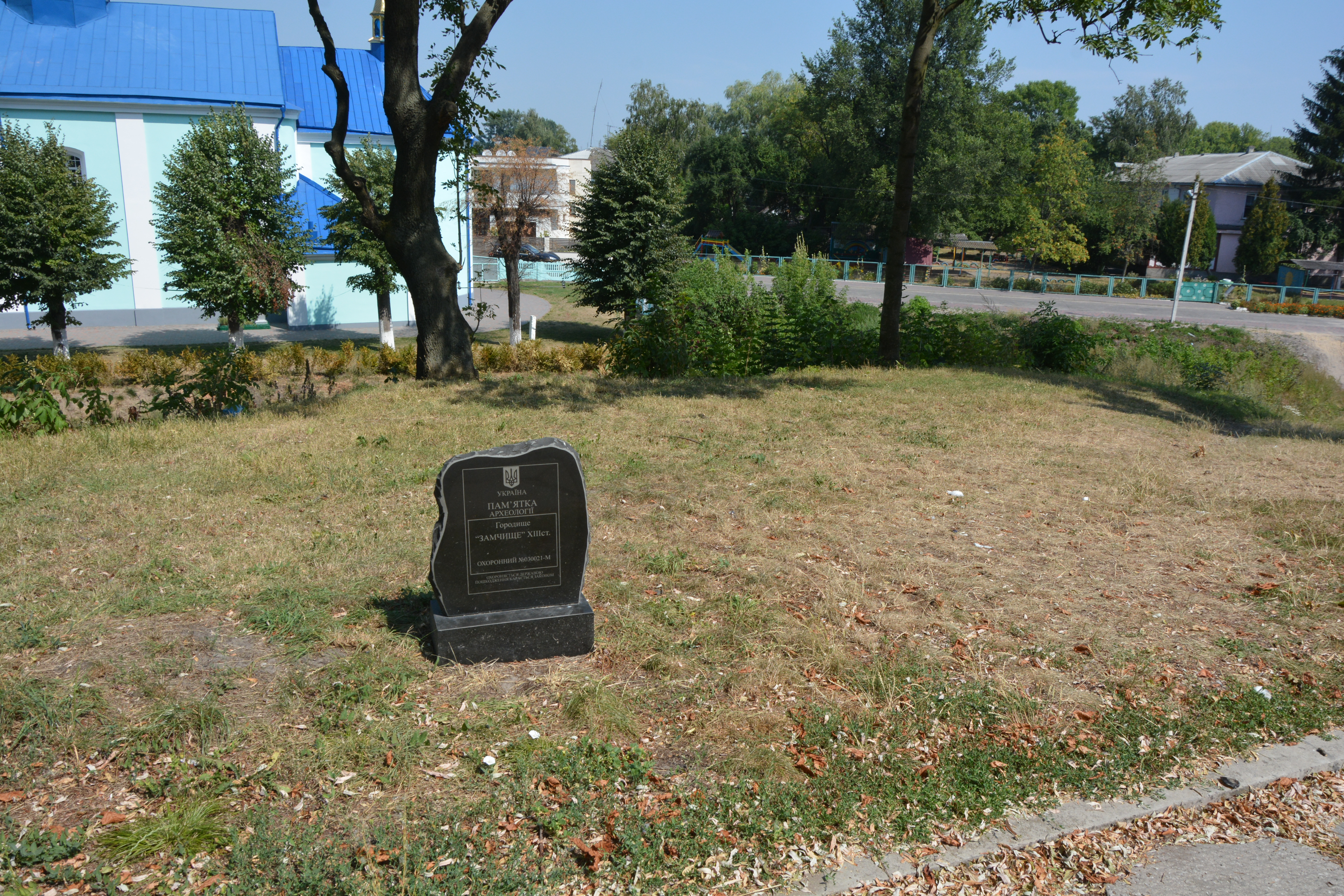
Sign of Ancient Settlement of 13th–14th centuries in the city centre

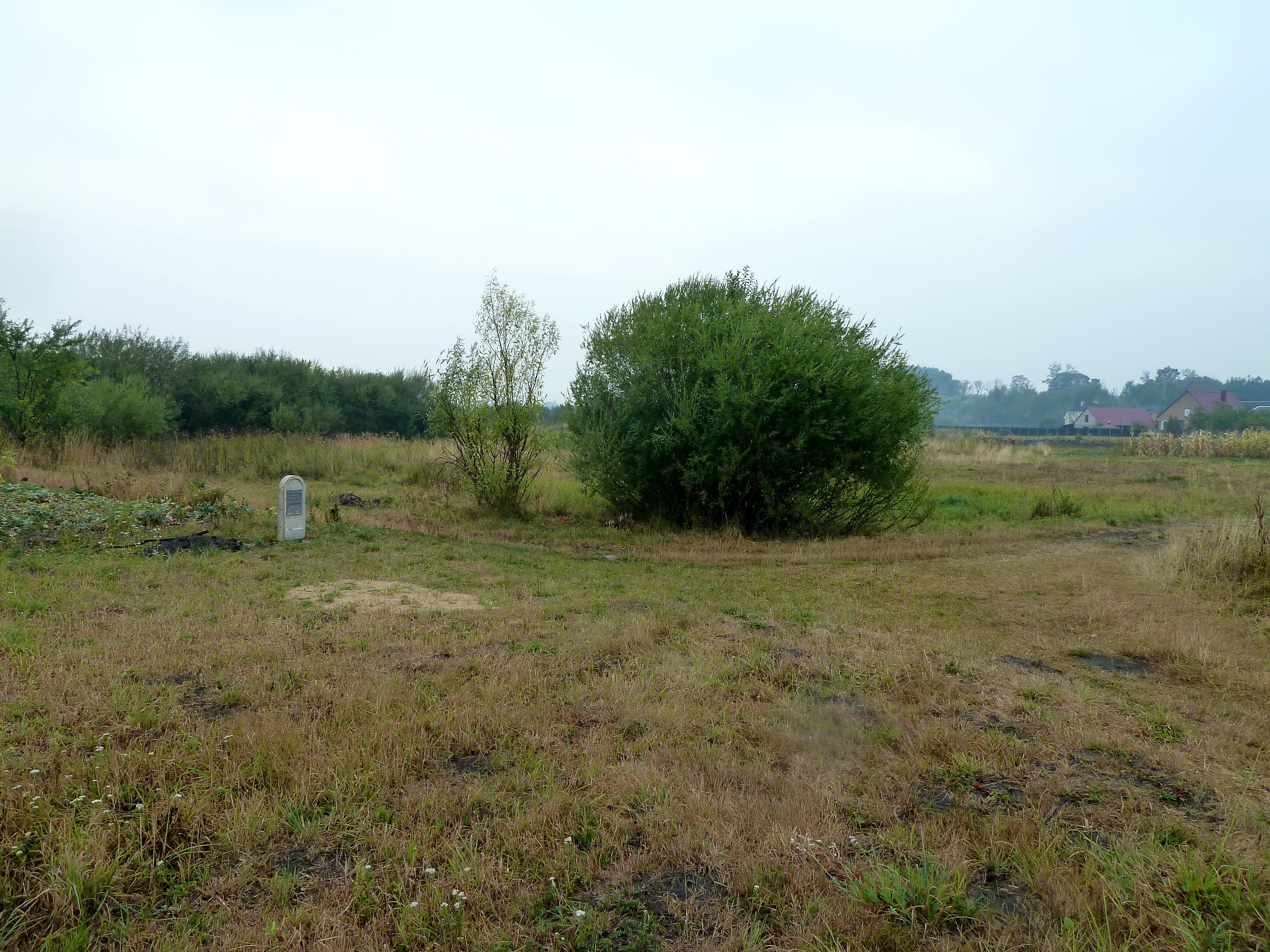
Ancient Settlement in hole “Shopy”, X cent.

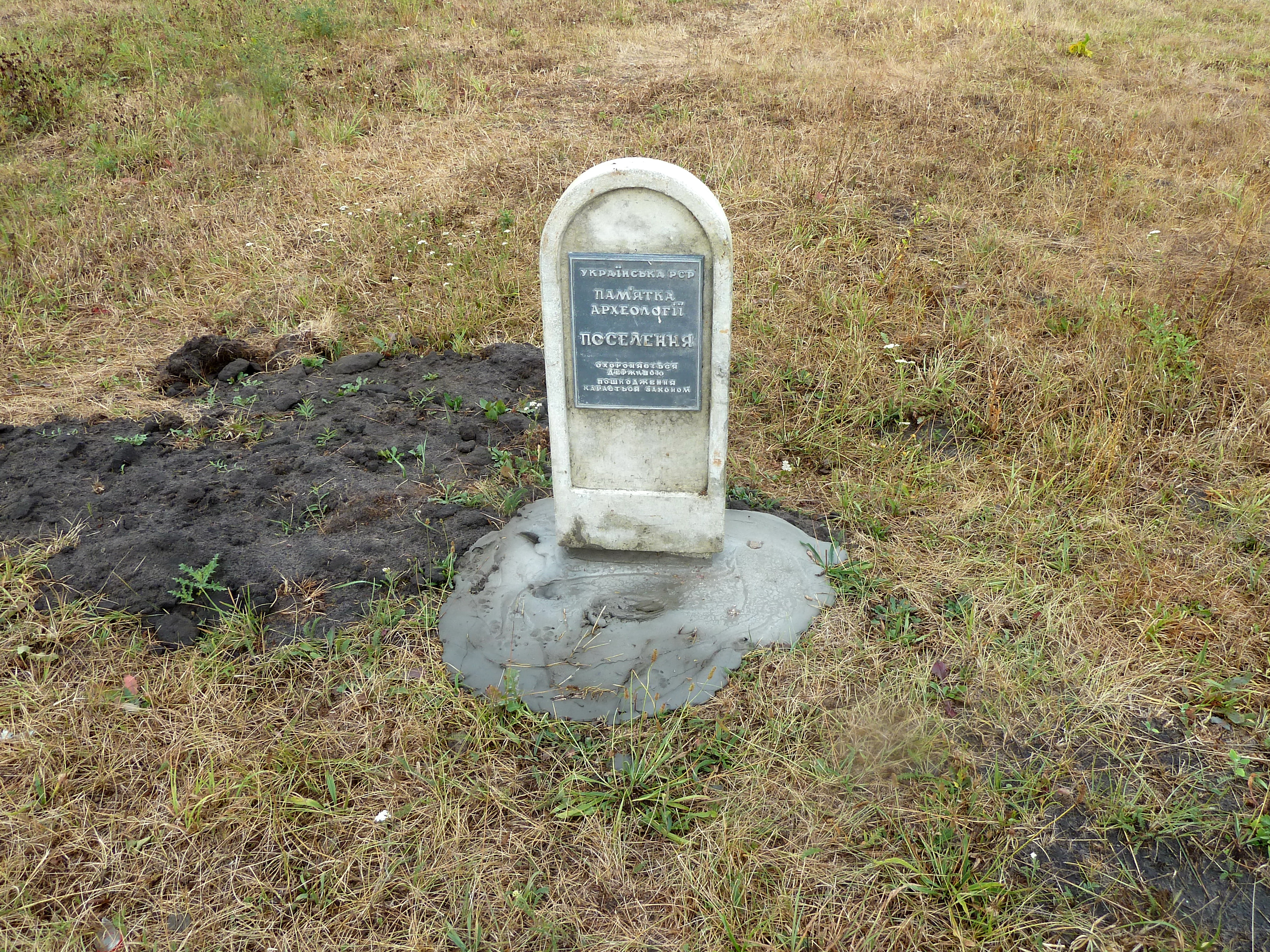
Sign of Ancient Settlement in hole “Shopy”, 10th century

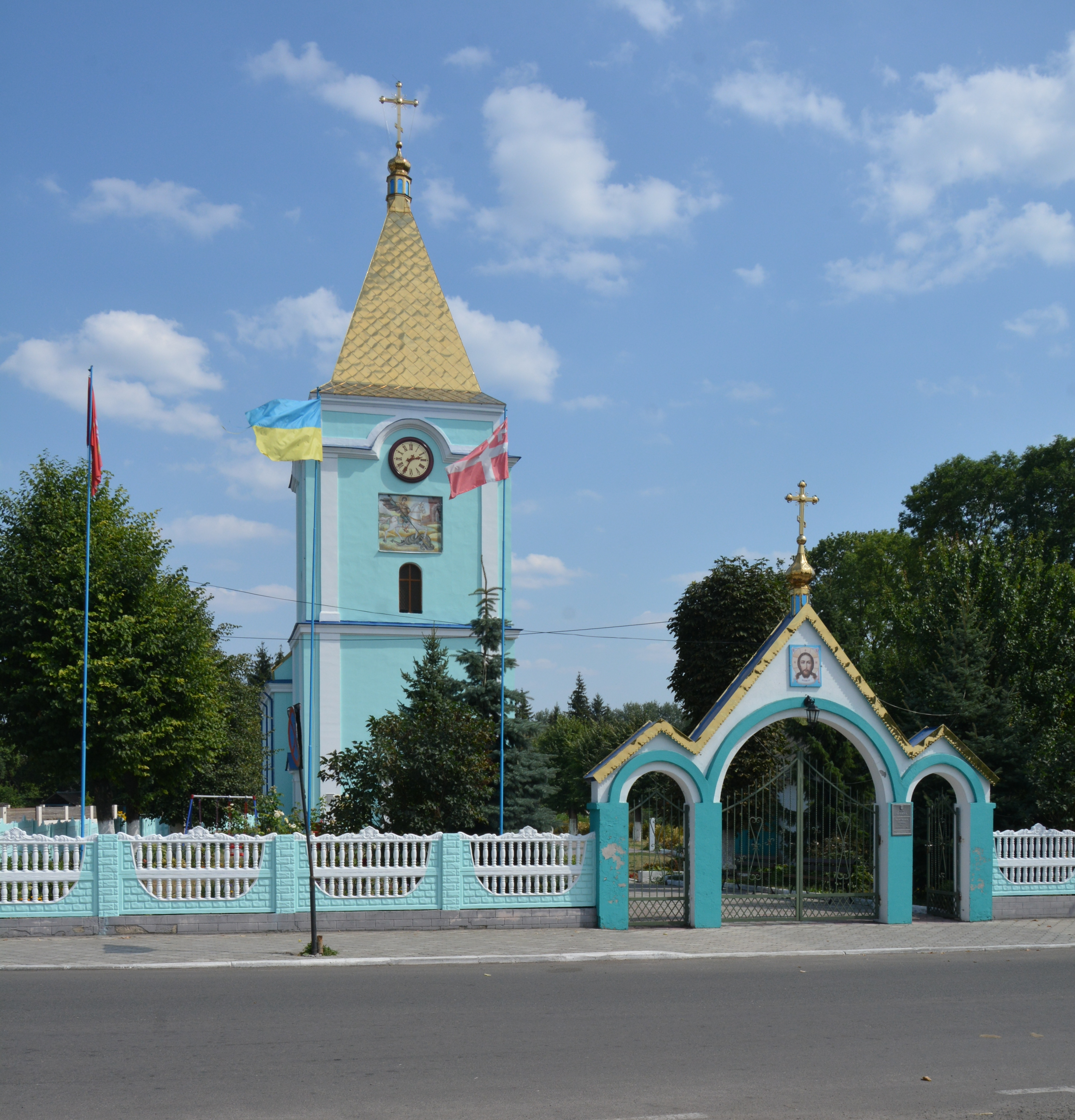
Saint George Church (1264), entrance view

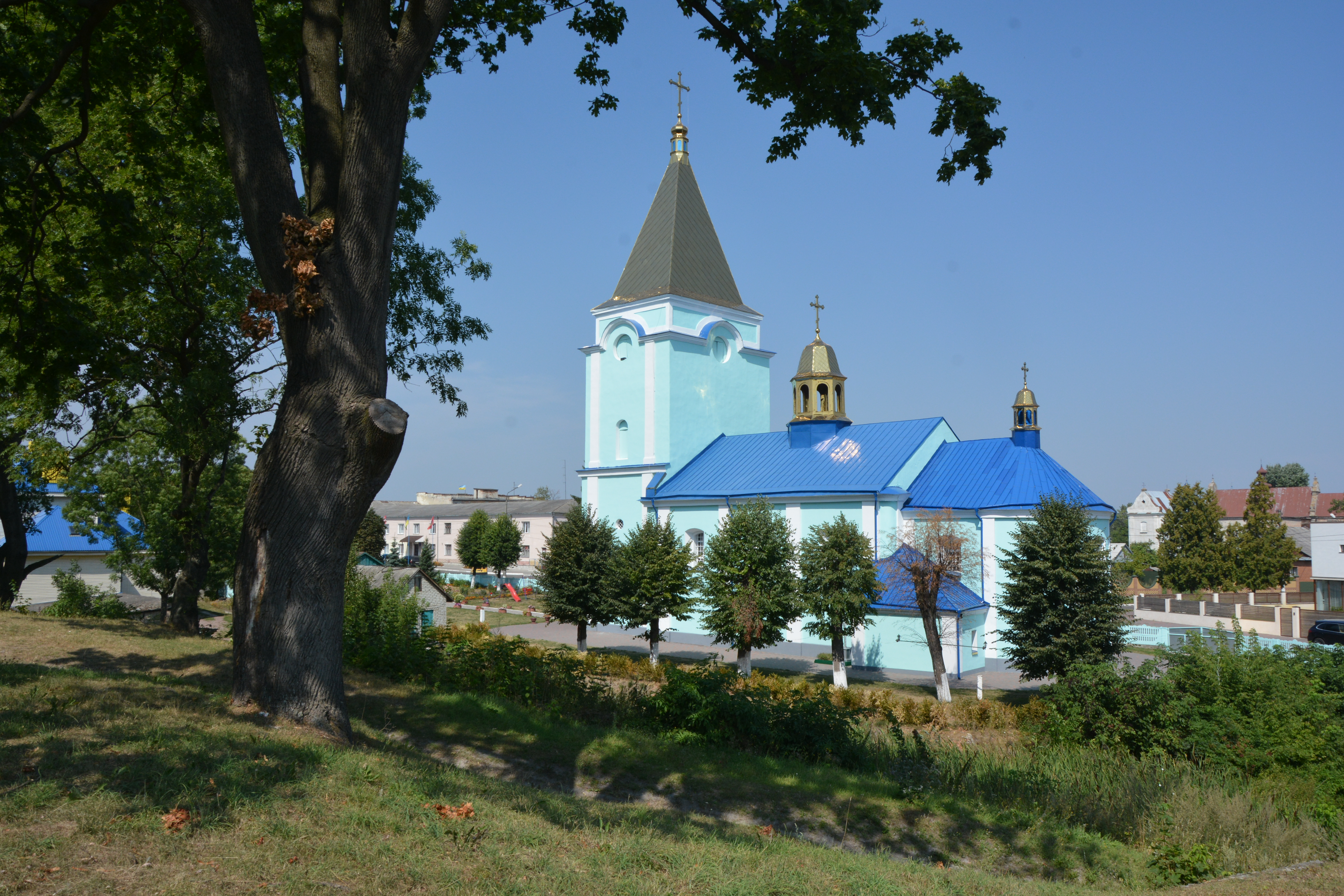
Saint George Church (1264), side view

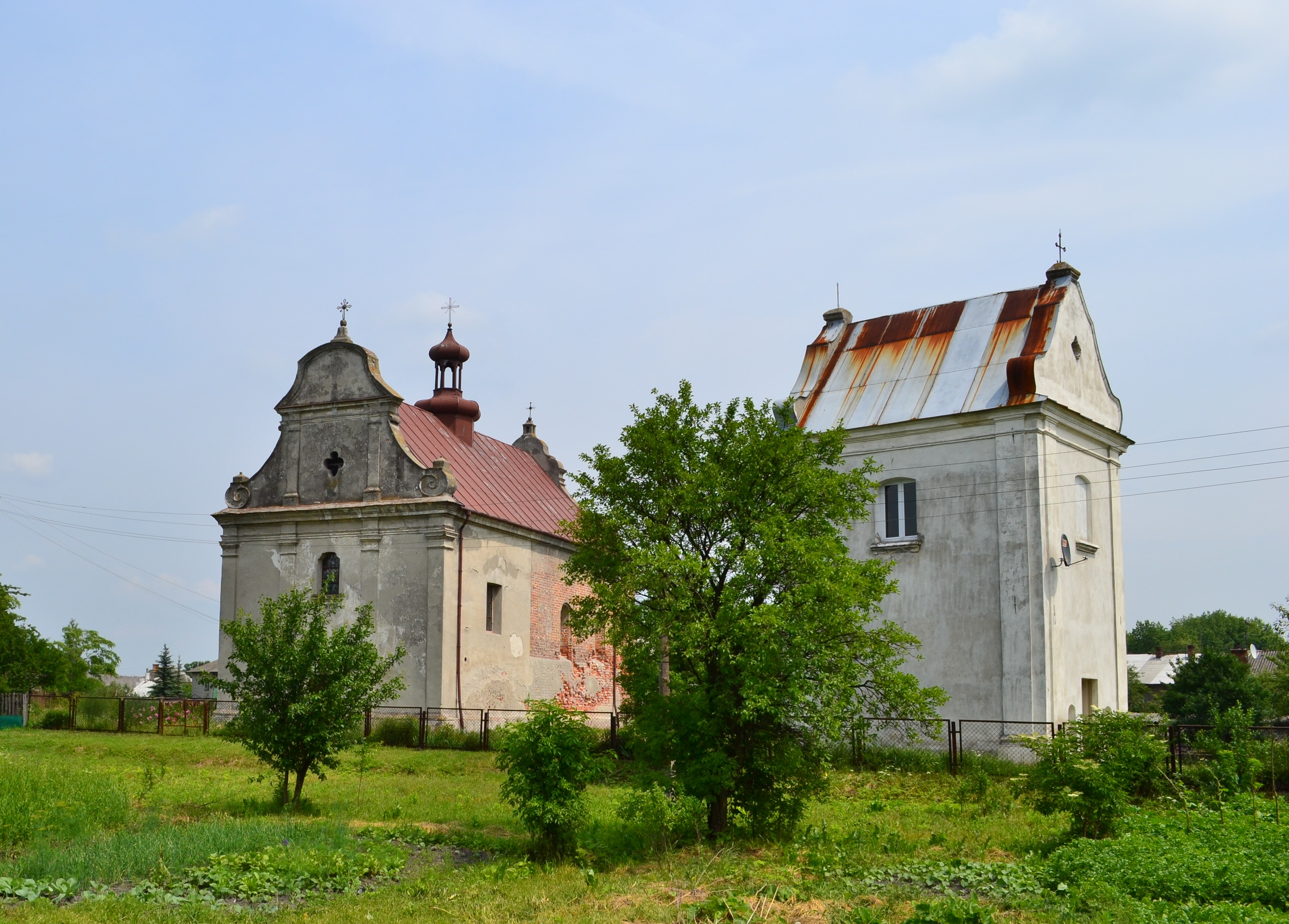
Kostel of the Holy Trinity (1412) with bell tower (1764), complex

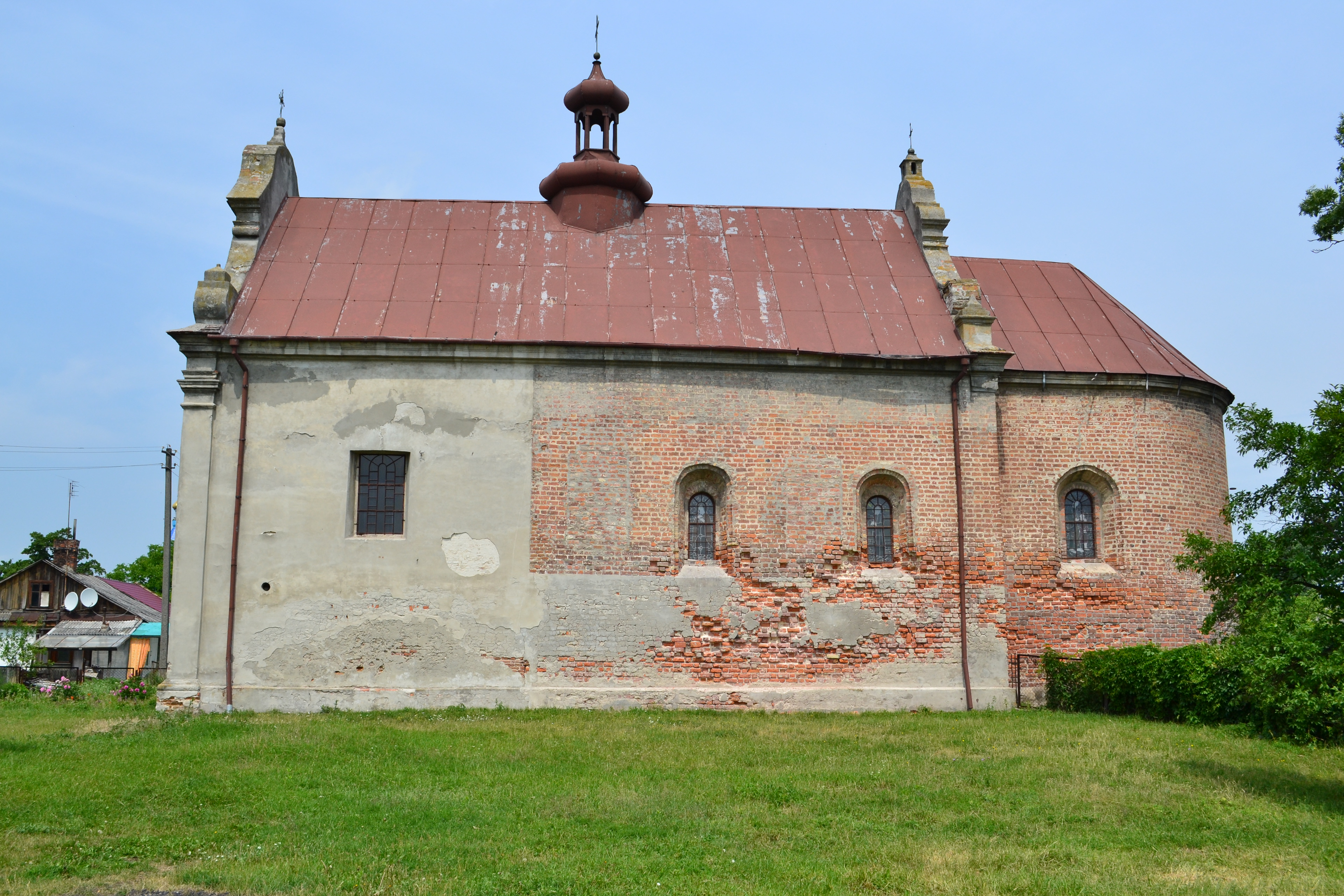
Kostel of the Holy Trinity (1412), side view

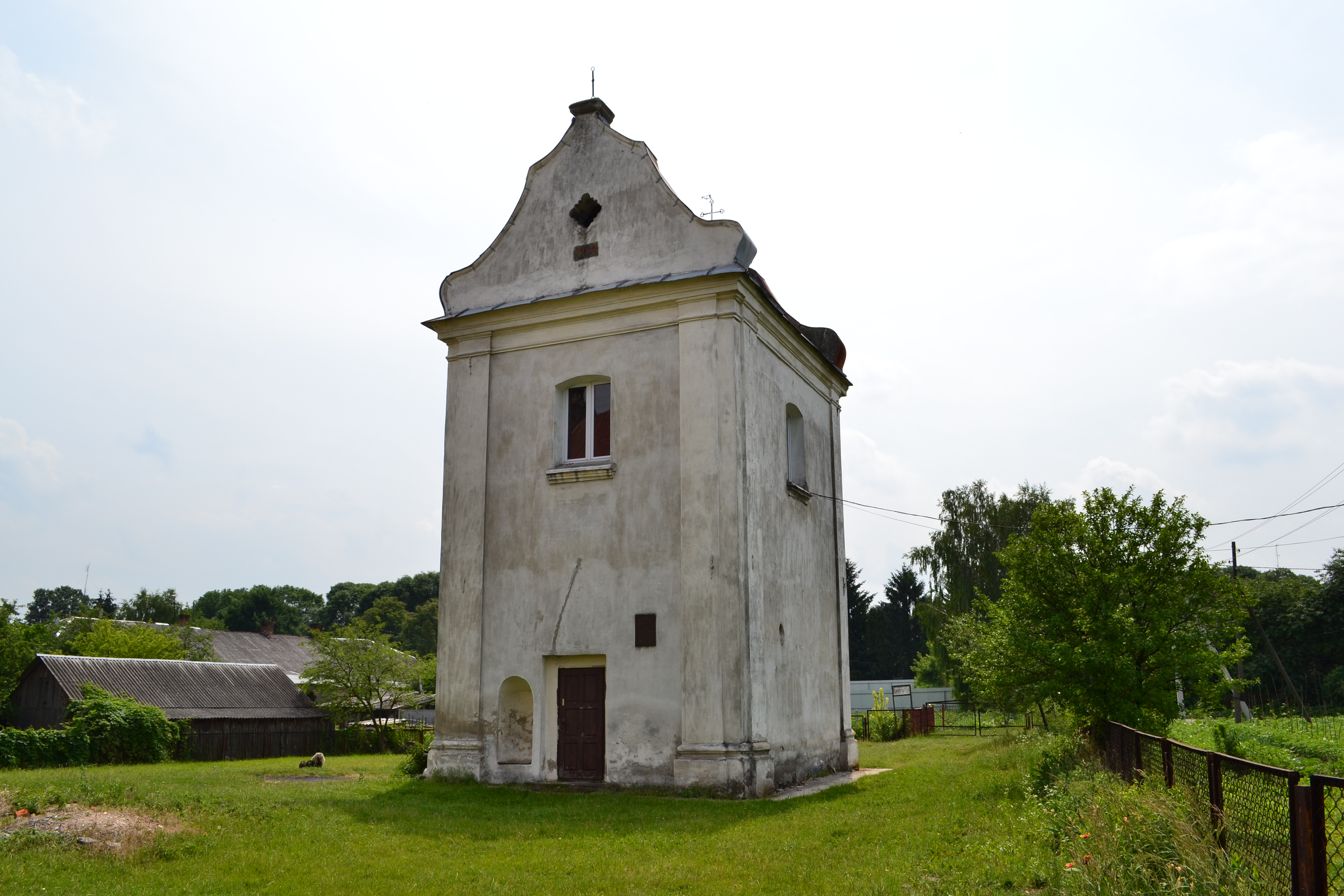
Bell Tower (1764) of Kostel of the Holy Trinity, entrance view

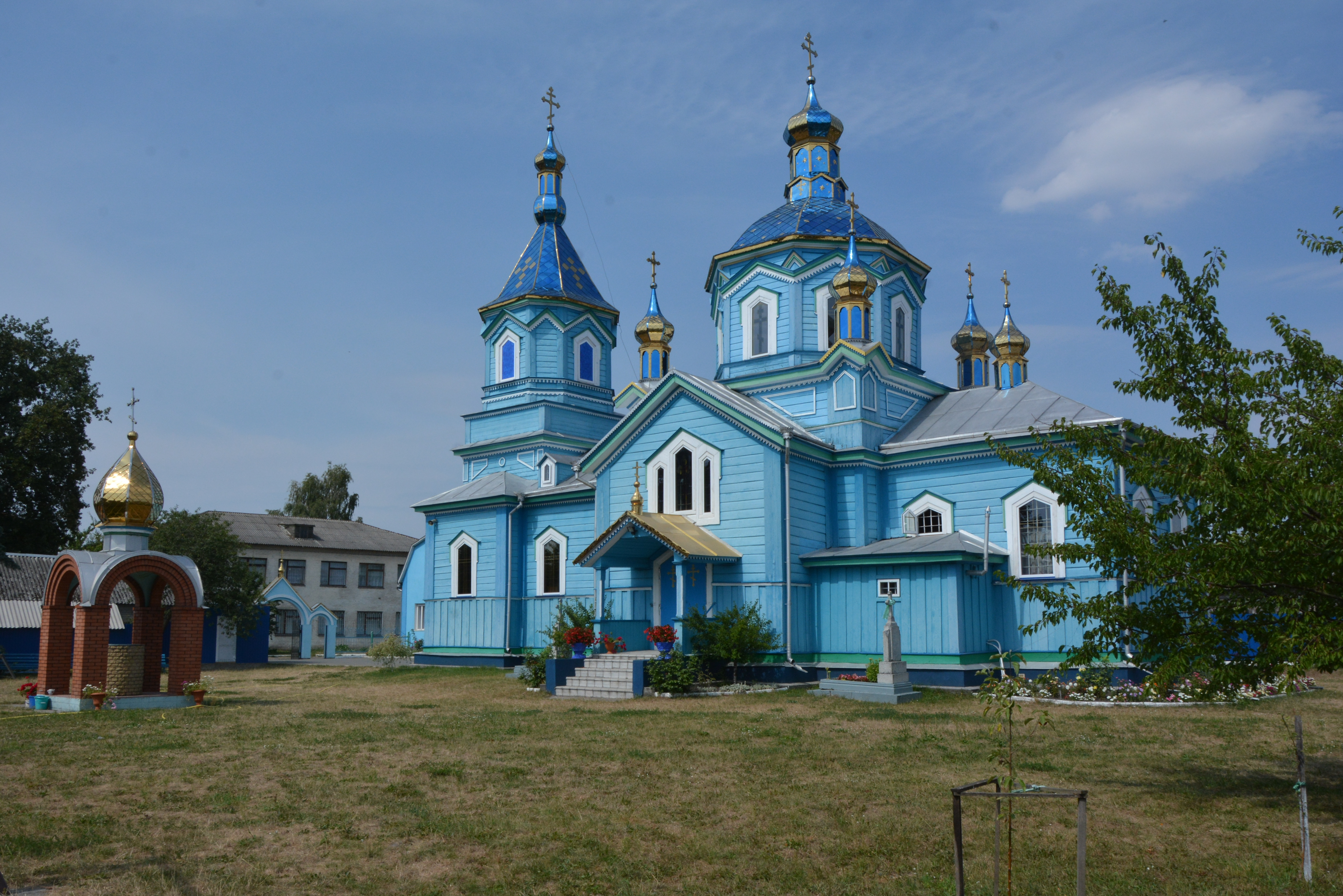
Nativity of Virgin Mary Church (wooden, 1884)

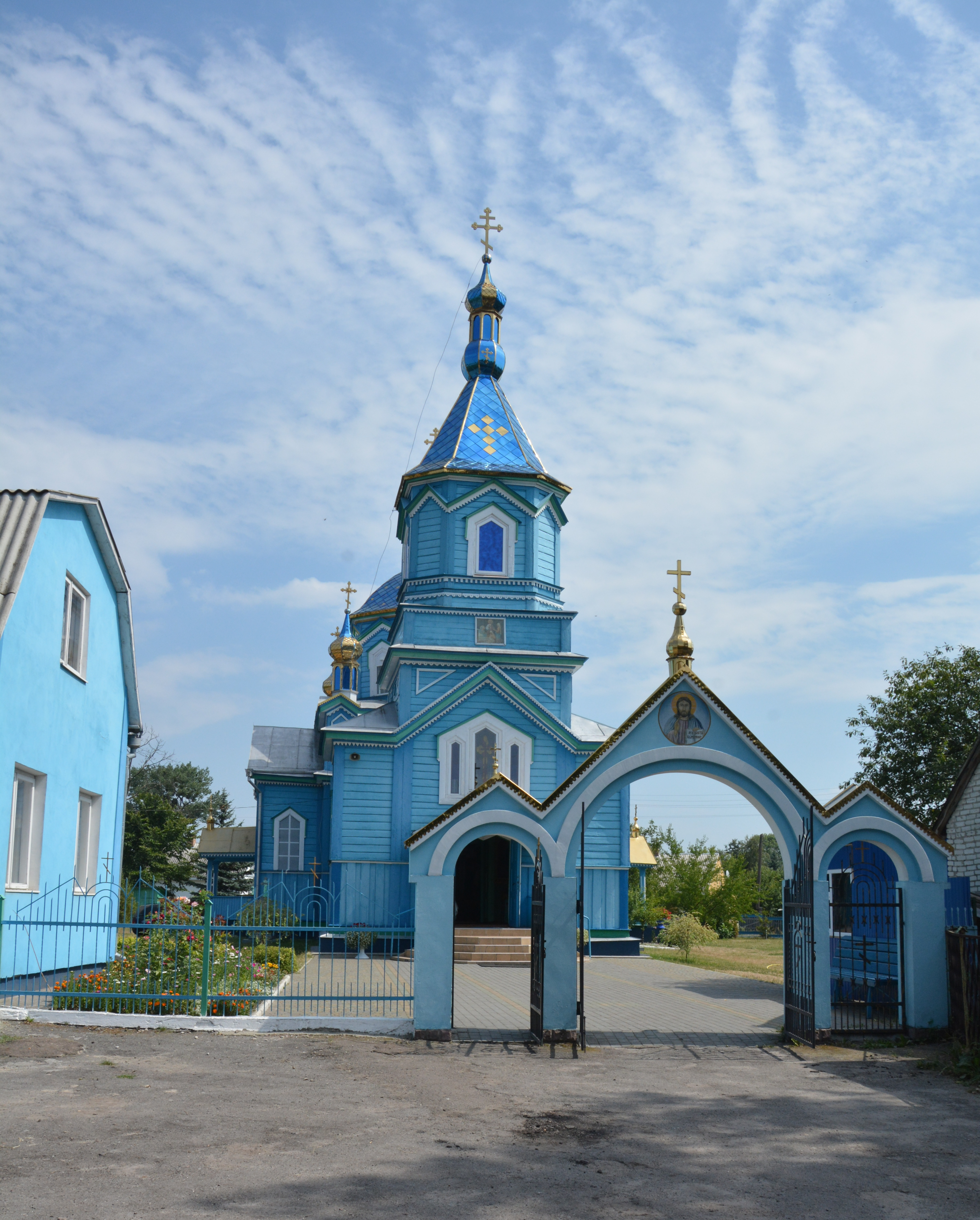
Nativity of Virgin Mary Church, entrance view

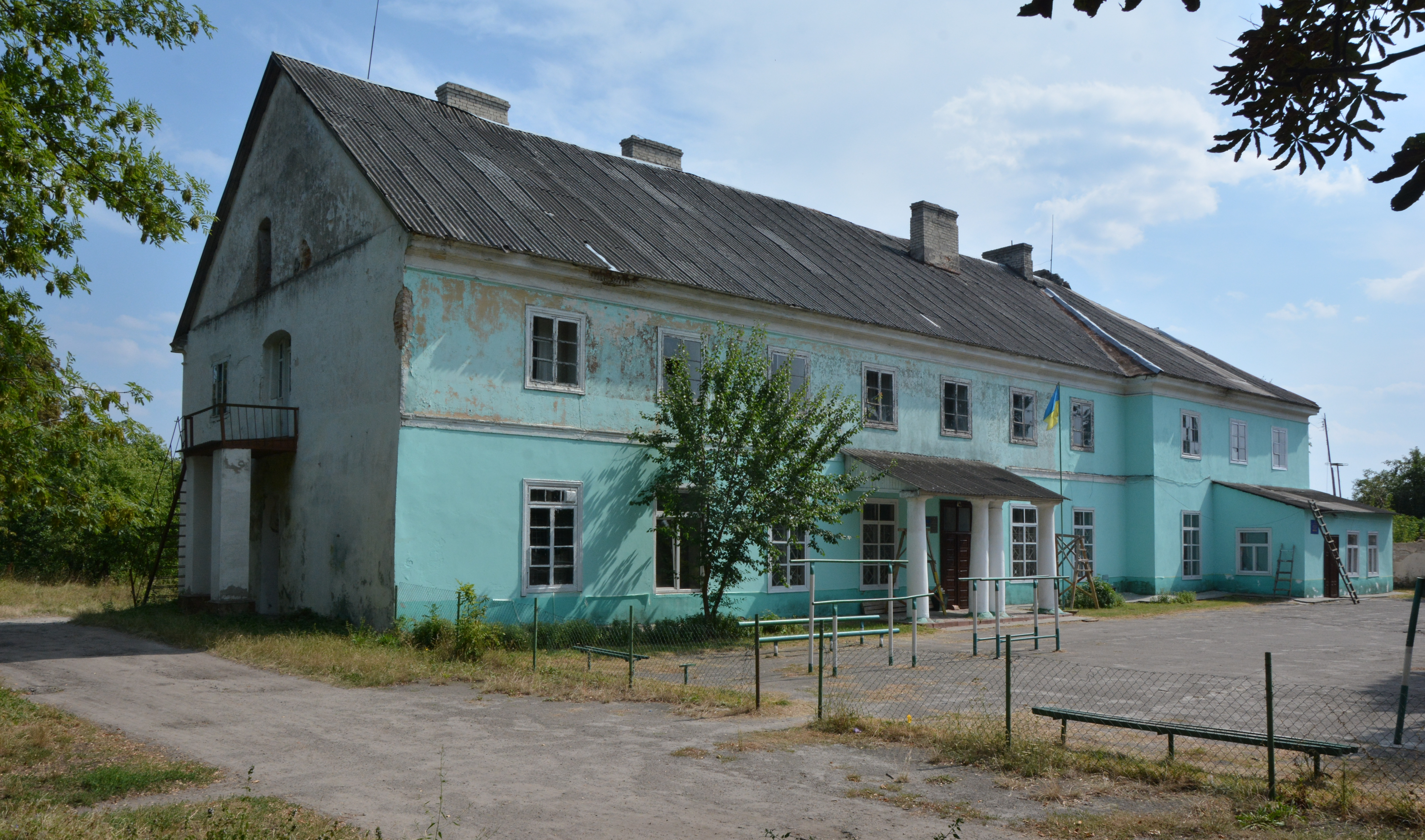
Palace of polish counts Branicki (2nd half of XVIII cent)

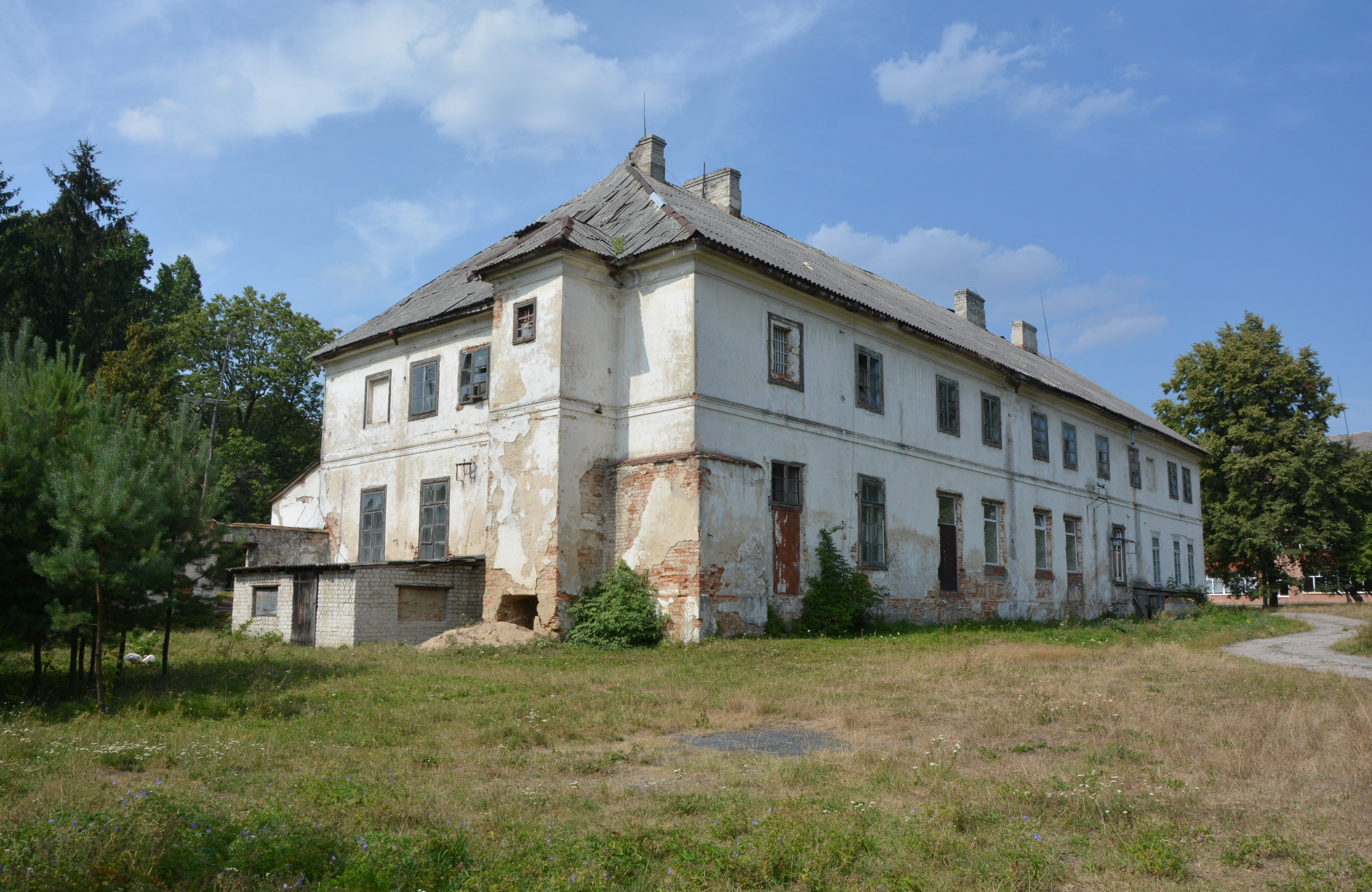
Palace of polish counts Branicki, back view

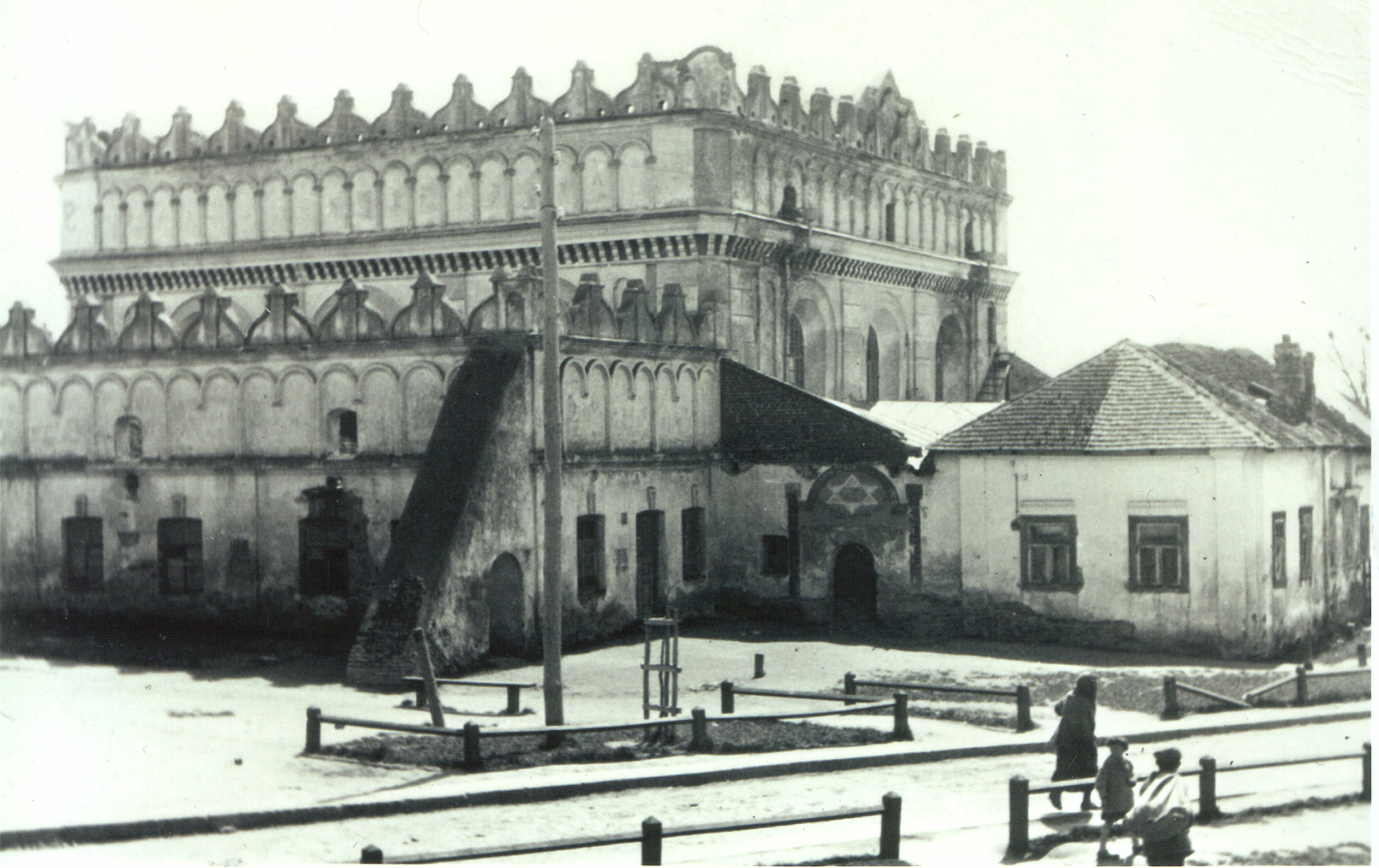
Great Synagogue (1510) ruined in 1947

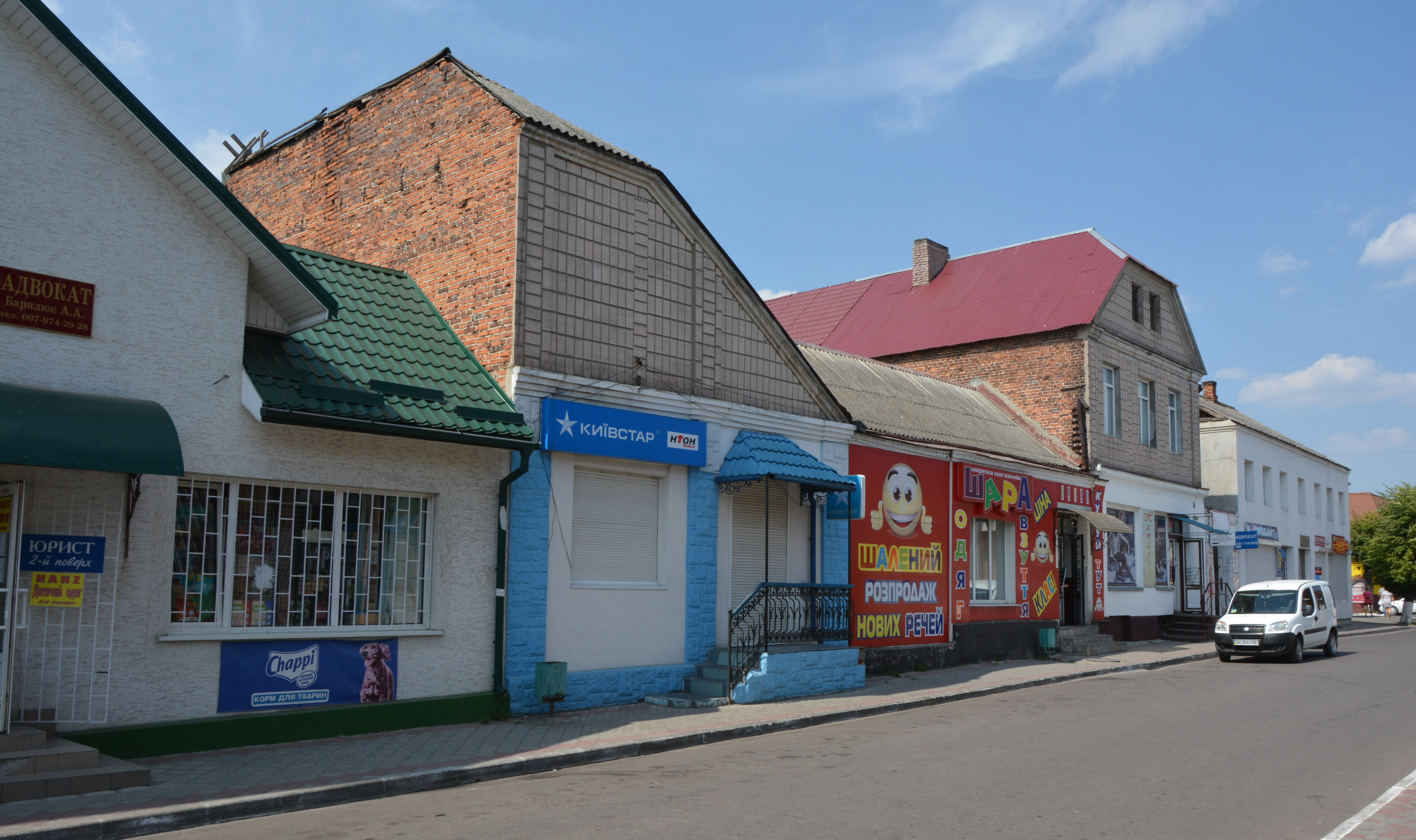
Historical central square buildings (faced)

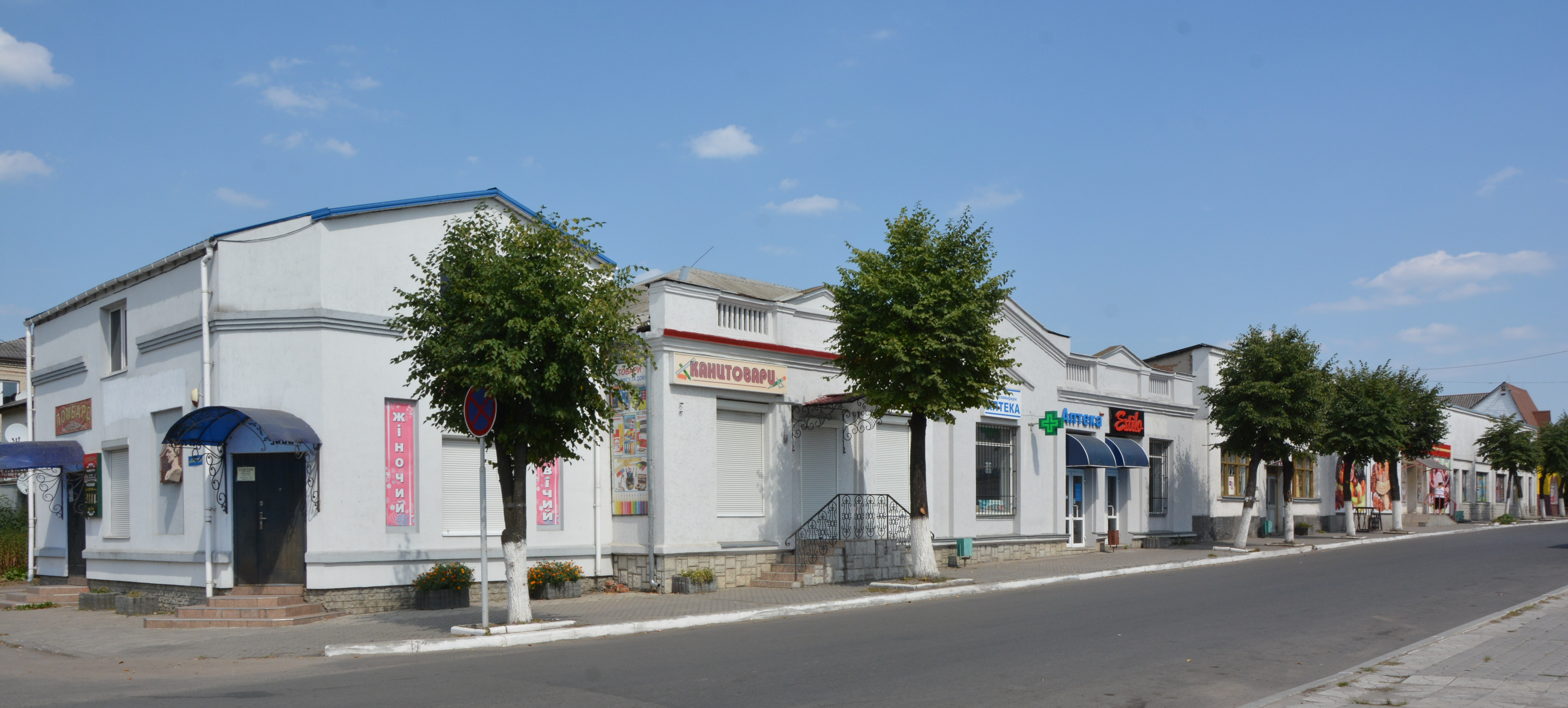
Historical market place buildings

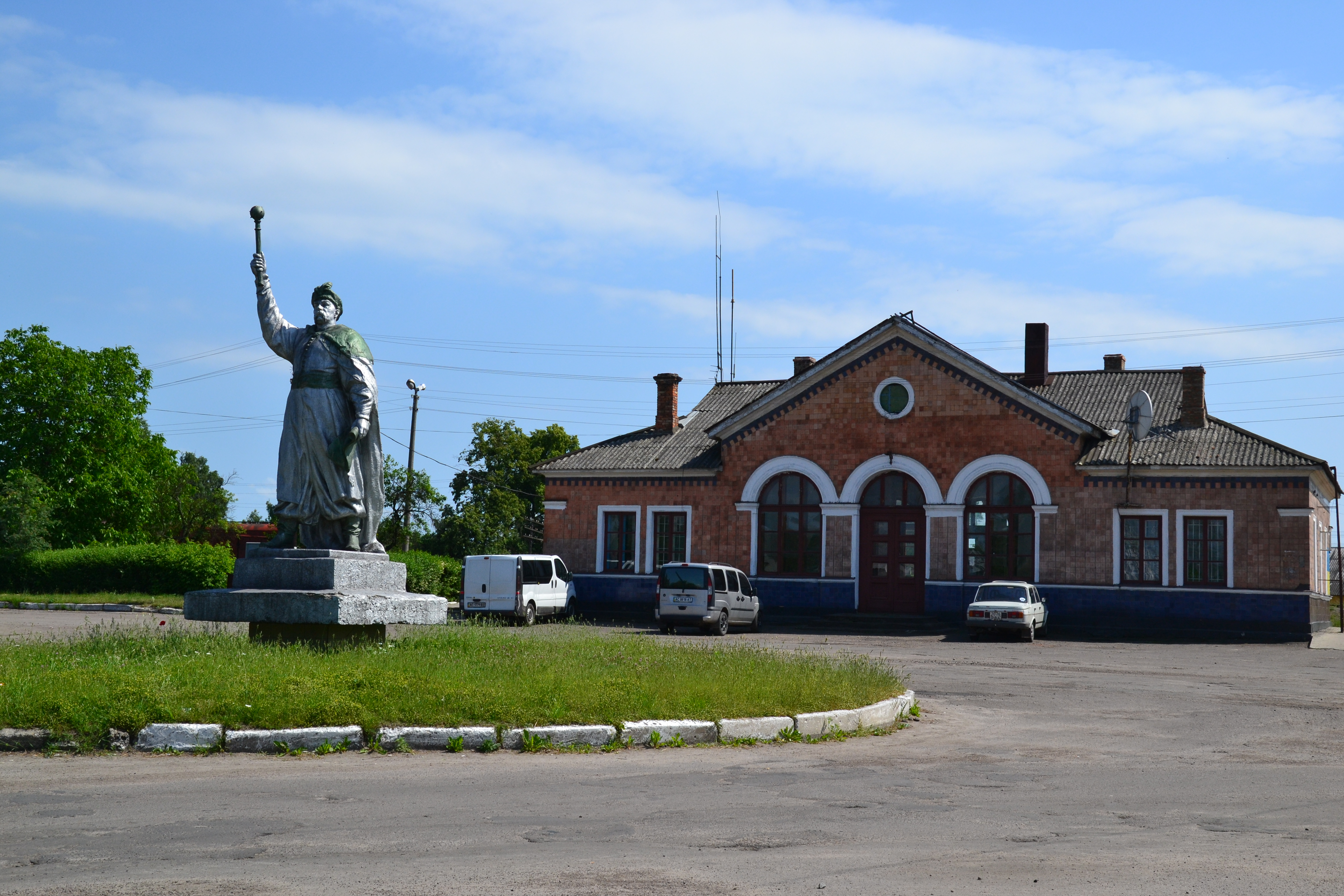
Statue of Bohdan Khmelnytskiy

== See also ==
- Luboml: My Heart Remembers, a documentary film that describes Jewish life in Liuboml between the two World Wars and mourns the town's Jewish population, lost during World War II.
