= Ukrainian State =

1918 client state of the German Empire

Coordinates: 50.45°N 30.5167°E

Ukrainian State Українська Держава
- 1918
- Flag Coat of arms
- Motto: Слава Україні! Гетьманові слава! ("Glory to Ukraine! Glory to the Hetman!")
- Anthem: Ще не вмерла України ("Ukraine has not yet perished")
- Prior to the Treaty of Brest-Litovsk (Note: Territory controlled by the Ukrainian State's predecessor state, the Ukrainian People's Republic); After the Treaty of Brest-Litovsk; Claimed but uncontrolled
- Status: Client state of the German Empire
- Capital: Kyiv
- Common languages: Ukrainian; Russian
- Religion: Eastern Orthodoxy (official); Eastern Catholicism
- Demonym: Ukrainian
- Government: Provisional semi-constitutional monarchy under an authoritarian conservative military dictatorship
- Hetman
  - 1918: Pavlo Skoropadsky
- Otaman
  - April–May: Mykola Vasylenko
  - May–November: Fedir Lyzohub
  - November–December: Serhii Herbel
- Legislature: None (rule by decree); Ukrainian Soim (proscribed)
- Historical era: World War I
  - Established: 29 April 1918
  - Anti-Hetman Uprising: 14 December 1918
Preceded by	Succeeded by
Ukrainian People's Republic	Ukrainian People's Republic
- Today part of: Ukraine; Russia; Belarus; Poland; Moldova

The Ukrainian State (Ukrainian: Українська Держава, romanized: Ukraiinska Derzhava) (Note: also referred to as the Second Hetmanate (Ukrainian: Другий Гетьманат) or simply The Hetmanate) was the official name of Ukraine used between 29 April and 14 December 1918, (Note: For dates prior to 1 March [O.S. 16 February] 1918, when the Ukrainian People's Republic adopted the Gregorian calendar, both the Julian (Old Style) and Gregorian (New Style) calendar dates are used.) following the deposition of the Central Rada of Ukrainian People's Republic. For the entirety of its existence, the state was ruled autocratically by Pavlo Skoropadsky, the Hetman of all Ukraine, who took a sharp departure from the earlier democratic and socialist-leaning policies of the Central Rada, instead aligning his government with the interests of large landowners and industrialists.

Established against the backdrop of the Central Powers becoming increasingly dissatisfied with the Ukrainian government's inability to fulfil its obligations to provide large quantities of food and raw goods as per the Treaty of Brest-Litovsk, the Ukrainian State was deeply politically, economically and militarily dependent upon the Central Powers, particularly Germany and Austria-Hungary, who pledged to support Skoropadsky's rule in return for greater control over the state. Despite this dependency, the Ukrainian State pursued a largely independent internal policy and managed to establish a relatively well-functioning bureaucracy, in contrast to the chaos of the previous government.

Failure to complete land reform, a perceived support for often violent German and Austrian methods to extract grain from the countryside and a controversial ethnic policy (which was seen as too Russophilic) led to the Ukrainian population becoming dissatisfied with the government of the Ukrainian State. Meanwhile, Skoropadsky's main backers, Germany and Austria, had been defeated by the Triple Entente, leaving the Ukrainian State at the mercy of neighbouring countries, particularly the Russian Soviet Federative Socialist Republic. Tensions finally culminated in the Anti-Hetman Uprising, during which the Directorate toppled the Ukrainian State and re-established the Ukrainian People's Republic.

== History ==
=== Background ===
On 29 December [O.S. 16 December] 1917, the Bolshevik government Petrograd issued an ultimatum to the Central Rada in Kyiv. The ultimatum, while recognising the autonomy of the Ukrainian People's Republic (often referred to as the UPR) as per the earlier Third Universal, also demanded the Rada agree to the following within 48 hours:

- Cease disarming Soviet troops in its territory.
- Block passage for White sympathisers, who frequently travelled through Ukraine to join the White Don forces.
- Allow Soviet troops to travel to the front through Ukraine.

The Rada refused to comply with the ultimatum.

In response, the Bolshevik diplomats met with Soviet delegates to the Third Congress of Soviets from Kharkiv and Kryvyi Rih in Kharkiv (already controlled by Bolshevik forces) and proclaimed the establishment of the Ukrainian People's Republic of Soviets, effectively creating a rival government to the Rada in Kyiv. On 30 December [O.S. 17 December] 1917, the Soviet Ukrainian government officially declared war upon the Rada, marking the formal beginning of the Ukrainian–Soviet War.

The war proceeded poorly for the UPR. On 29 December [O.S. 16 December] 1917, the Arsenal Uprising began, which forced a large portion of the 16,000 strong Ukrainian garrison in Kyiv to be used for suppressing it. Soviet troops under the command of General Muravyov faced unexpected resistance by the much inferior Ukrainian forces at Kruty, but nevertheless advanced quickly. The Battle of Kyiv began on 23 January [O.S. 10 January] 1918 and was concluded by the Bolshevik capture of the city three days later.

Against the backdrop of complete military defeat, the Central Rada committed to signing the Treaty of Brest-Litovsk on 2 March [O.S. 17 February] 1918, in which the Central Powers recognised the independence of Ukraine and pledged to help liberate its territories from Bolshevik troops. German forces then recaptured much of the Ukrainian territory under the control of the Bolsheviks, including Kyiv itself. The chaos of the previous months had, however, left the Rada in a precarious situation, as it was unable to re-establish control over large parts of the country (primarily in the vast rural areas).

Austria-Hungary and especially the German Empire had expected huge shipments of grain, other foodstuffs and raw industrial materials from Ukraine to alleviate the shortages caused by the wartime blockade, but the Ukrainian government was unable to extract or transport these items. This led to increased friction between the Rada and the Central Powers, as it was thought that the Ukrainian government was not fulfilling its obligations.

Tensions reached a new high on 6 April 1918, when Field Marshal Hermann von Eichhorn, the commander of the German Army Group Kiev, issued his so-called "cultivation order", in which he accused the Ukrainian peasants of not sowing their fields and instructed that Germans must ensure that the fields were sowed, even at the threat of military intervention. This was very unpopular with the local population and greatly angered the Rada, which issued a note of protest on 13 April. Meanwhile, on 18 April, the German ambassador in Kyiv, Alfons von Mumm, informed Berlin that "collaboration with present government, considering its tendencies, is impossible", having earlier recommended that the Rada should be overthrown and a new government put in place.

In mid-April, Mumm stablished contact with a former general of the Russian Imperial Army of Ukrainian origin, Pavlo Skoropadsky. He was deemed to be a suitable candidate for leading a new government in Ukraine. On 26 April, Skoropadsky met with General Wilhelm Groener, the commander of the German I Corps, to discuss specific conditions under which his rule would be supported. These included:

- Acceptance of the Treaty of Brest-Litovsk
- Dissolution of the Central Rada
- Abolition of the Ukrainian Constituent Assembly
- Unlimited export of raw and manufactured goods
- German approval of all cabinet members in government
- German determination of the size of the Ukrainian army

=== Establishment ===
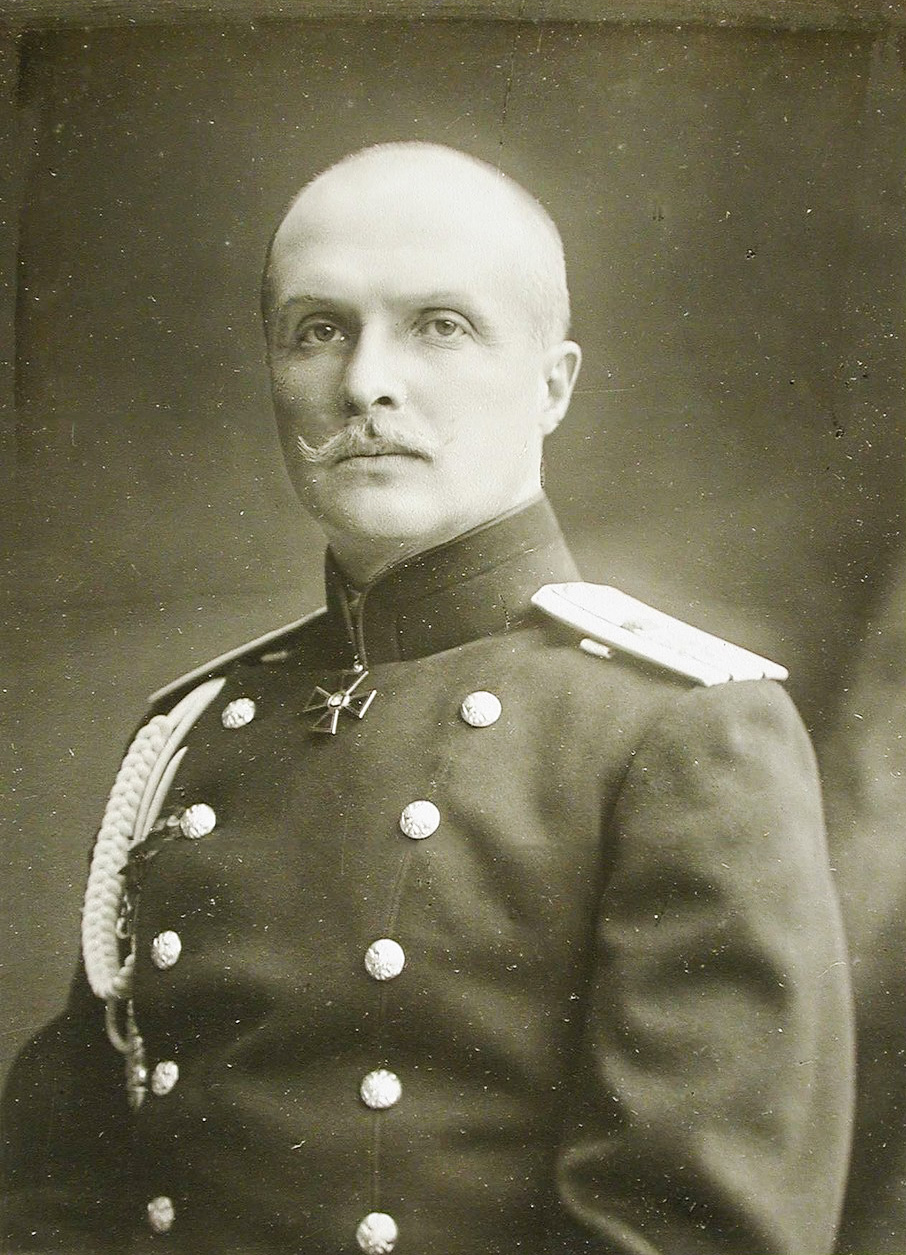
Pavlo Skoropadsky, Hetman of Ukraine

German relations with the Rada broke down completely after the so-called Dobryi Affair, in which the wealthy banker Abraham Dobryi, director of the Kyiv section of the Russian Bank for Foreign Trade was abducted on the 24 April 1918. As Dobryi was member of a special commission of the Ukrainian Ministry of Finance which negotiated financial operations with the Central Powers, chiefly Germany, and was thus well known to the Germans, his sudden and unexplained disappearance resulted in Germany's complete loss of trust in the Ukrainian government. Field Marshal Eichhorn responded to the incident by issuing a decree which granted the German military courts jurisdiction over all criminal offences on 25 April, leaving only the civil cases to the Ukrainian judiciary. This prompted the premier Vsevolod Holubovych to state in the Rada:

Who is this Mr. Dobryi? Is he a subject of the German State? No, he is not a far relative nor a godparent, he is a stranger. And just because that stranger who legally has no connections with Germany and gave no halters to issue a decree of such colossal weight was abducted, the decree was issued.

Worse yet for the Rada, the subsequent German investigation connected the abduction to a secret organisation by the name of Committee for Ukraine's Salvation (Ukrainian: Комітет порятунку України), headed by several high-ranking members of the Ukrainian government, chiefly Mykhailo Tkachenko, the minister of the interior. Already on 26 April, the First Ukrainian Division, also known as the Bluecoat division (a unit formed from Ukrainian prisoners of war in Germany and Austria-Hungary, named so after their blue uniforms.) and units of the artillery regiments were disarmed by the Germans. On 28 April, an armed German detachment raided the Rada, loudly shouting at those present and arresting two officials in connection with the Dobryi Affair, while Tkachenko himself evaded capture due to being absent that day. The final meeting of the Rada then took place on 29 April, during which the constitution of the People's Republic of Ukraine was approved.

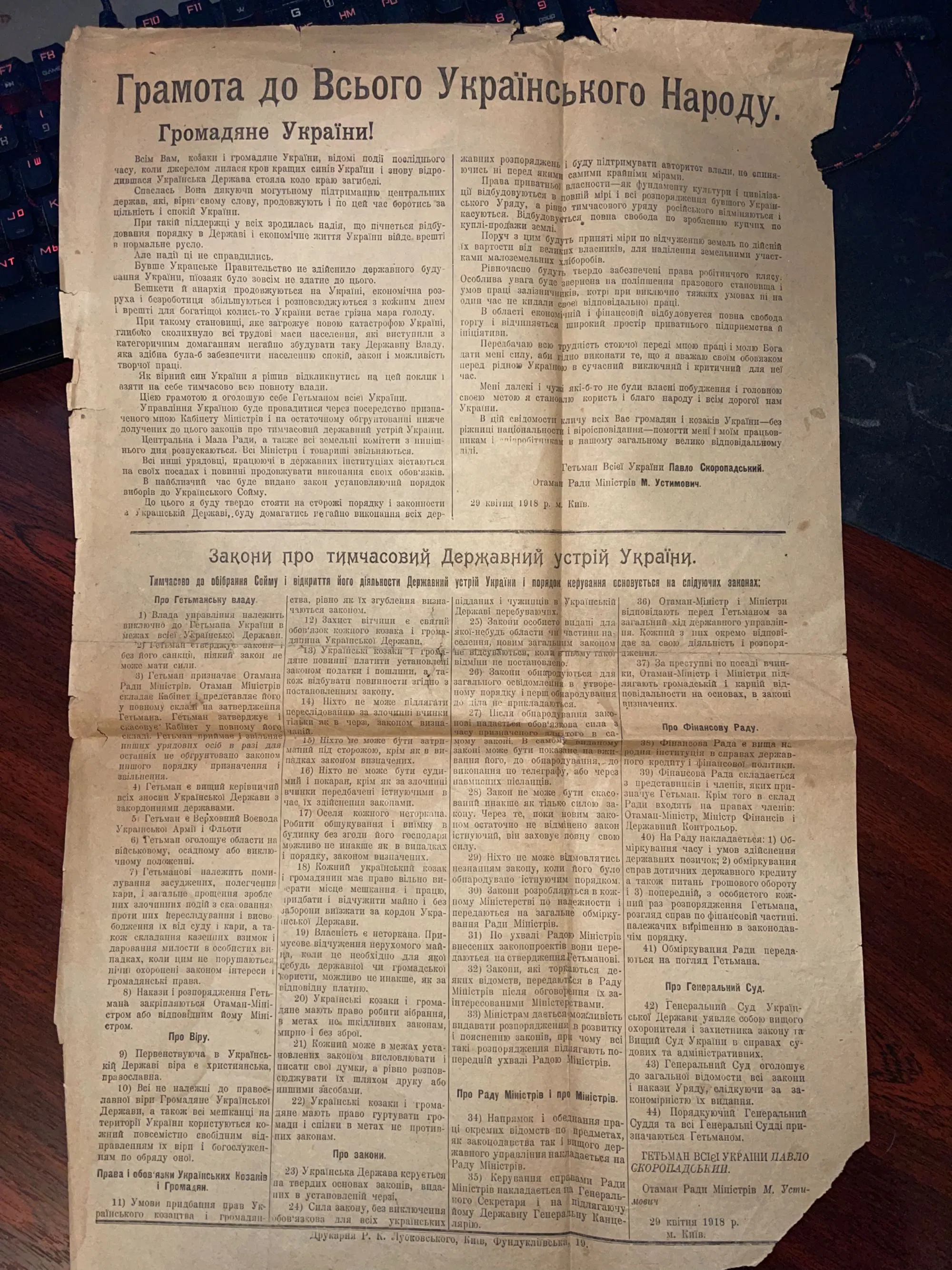
Manifesto to the All-Ukrainian Nation. Laws on the provisional state system of Ukraine.

Also on 29 April, a congress of the League of Landowners consisting of some 6,500 delegates from all eight governorates of Ukraine took place in the building of the Kyiv circus. The league consisted primarily of wealthy and Russified moderate and large landholders. After receiving information about the situation at the Congress from his couriers, Pavlo Skoropadsky later arrived in his car to the event where he was elected the Hetman of all Ukraine. After Skoropadsky received a standing ovation, the crowd moved to St. Sophia's Square, where Skoropadsky was served a moleben by Nykodym, the Vicar of Kyiv and Galicia (as Metropolitan Vladimir was executed by Bolsheviks). That night, the supporters of the Hetman took over the government building of military and internal affairs as well as the State Bank. The following day, the elite and most loyal formation of the Central Council, the Sich Riflemen, was disarmed.

Skoropadsky issued his manifesto (Ukrainian: грамота, romanized: hramota) "To the All-Ukrainian Nation" and the Law of the Provisional State System. Desiring stability, the Austro-Hungarian and German forces welcomed the coup; Skoropadsky cooperated with them, making him unpopular among many Ukrainian peasants. The new state retained the tryzub (coat of arms) and the national flag but reversed the design to light blue over yellow.

=== Reactions ===
The intrusion of occupying troops in Ukrainian internal affairs, as well as the reliance of the hetman on pro-Russian forces, caused great dissatisfaction among the general population. Soon after the coup, oppositional organs emerged, represented by the All-Ukrainian Peasant Congress, which illegally gathered in Holosiiv Forest on 8–10 May, and the All-Ukrainian Workers' Congress. Underground congresses were held by the Ukrainian Party of Socialist Revolutionaries and the Ukrainian Social-Democratic Labour Party. As a result, many members of the Ukrainian opposition, especially Social Revolutionaries, were put under arrest.

In parallel, pro-regime parties, such as Constitutional Democrats, organized their own meetings, supporting the hetman and demanding, among others, the introduction of Russian language as co-official. Large landowners and businessmen also established the so-called ProToFis - Union of Industrial, Trade, Finance and Agricultural Representatives. Simultaneously, numerous Russian press publications and officers' organizations conducted propaganda calling for the restoration of "one indivisible Russia" and conducted recruitment to the Volunteer Army, but were generally tolerated by the authorities.

Internal opposition was provoked by the requisitioning of food stocks and restoration of land to the wealthy landowners. Opponents of the Skoropadsky regime committed acts of arson and sabotage and, in July 1918, assassinated Hermann von Eichhorn, the commander of German troops in Ukraine. In August 1918, the anti-Skoropadsky coalition succeeded in forcing him to re-form the Sich Riflemen. By then it was becoming obvious that the Central Powers had lost the war and that Skoropadsky could no longer rely on their support. He thus looked for support from conservative Russian elements in society and proposed joining a federation with Anton Denikin and the White movement. This further eroded his standing among Ukrainians.

=== Dissolution ===
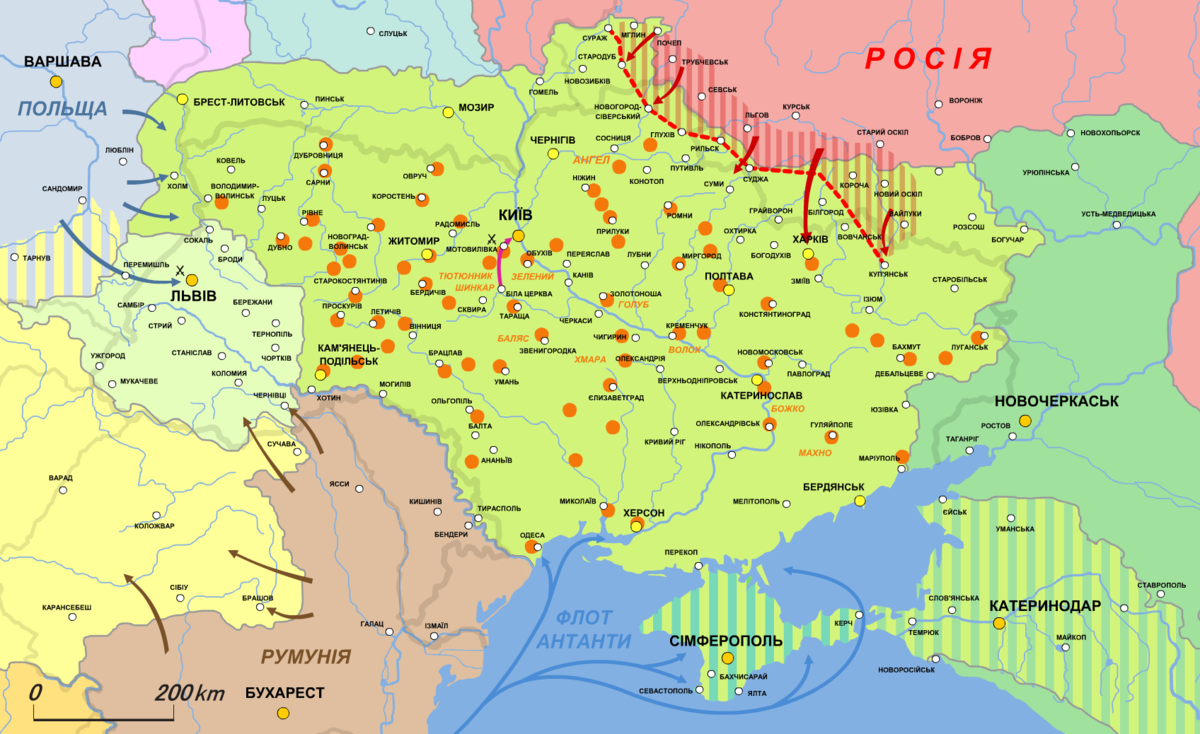
Ukraine in November and December 1918 Uprisings Demarcation line with the Russian SFSR Dashed Negotiations with Crimea and Kuban for joining the Ukrainian State Dashed Neutral zone between Russia and Ukraine prescribed by the Treaty of Brest-Litovsk

Almost the entire commanding staff of the Ukrainian State armed forces consisted of officers of the former Imperial Russian Army. Most officers were not supportive of the Ukrainian cause and viewed it as a way to make it through tough times. At the same time, wide masses of the population did not have a developed sense of nationalism and mainly chose to follow socialist and communist principles.

Following the defeat of Central Powers, part of the Council of Ministers adopted a pro-Entente orientation and initiated talks with members of the oppositionary Ukrainian National Union. Negotiations resulted in the creation of a new cabinet on 19–24 October, which included members of the Ukrainian Party of Socialists-Federalists. In his charter from 29 October, the hetman declared his allegiance to ideas of Ukrainian independence and promised to accelerate the execution of agrarian reform and preparations for convening the parliament.

After the armistice ending World War I, Ukrainian socialists formed the Directorate of Ukraine (the "Directory"), whose forces were mainly composed of the Sich Riflemen and "Greycoats". On 14 November, after the end of World War I, Skoropadsky declared his course on a federal union with non-Bolshevik Russia, hoping to satisfy demands of the Entente. Simultaneously, he appointed a new government headed by Sergei Gerbel. These actions led to a rebellion spearheaded by the Ukrainian National Union. Although German and Austrian troops had not yet withdrawn from Ukraine, they had no further interest in fighting. Most of Skoropadsky's own forces changed sides and joined the Directory.

On 16 November 1918, starting in Bila Tserkva, fighting broke out in the Hetmanate. Skoropadsky had to turn to the thousands of Russian White Guard officers who had escaped to Ukraine with the intention of joining Denikin's Volunteer Army in the region of the Don river further east. The officers were assembled into a "Special Corps" but proved unable to resist the Directory's forces led by Symon Petliura. Skoropadsky abdicated his position as Hetman on 14 December, as the Ukrainian People's Army took Kyiv. He fled to Switzerland and then Germany under disguise. Upon his abdication, Skoropadsky transferred his powers to the Council of Ministers, which in its turn surrendered itself to the Directorate.

== Geography ==
The country lay in Eastern Europe along the middle and lower sections of the Dnieper on the coast of the Black Sea and the Sea of Azov. The Ukrainian State covered most of the territory of modern-day Ukraine, with the exception of most of West Ukraine, Budjak and Crimea. Its territory, however, extended into today's Russia, Belarus, Moldova and Poland.

To its northeast Ukraine established a preliminary demarcation line with the Russian SFSR, on the east it had a border with the Don Republic, to its south were the Black and Azov Seas, while the Crimean peninsula—the Crimean Regional Government—came under the control of Sulkevych. To the southwest along the Dniester lay a border with the Kingdom of Romania, to the west Ukraine bordered the German Empire and Austria-Hungary. To the north were the German-occupied territories of Ober Ost and the Belarusian People's Republic.

== Politics ==
=== Legal basis ===
Immediately after his takeover of power, Skoropadsky issued the "Law on the Temporary State Structure of Ukraine", which allocated the whole legislative and executive power to the hetman and proclaimed him commander in chief of the Armed Forces and the Navy. This concentration of power was supposed to last until the election of a parliament, which would adopt a new constitution. Control over the courts and legal jurisdiction was transferred to the General Court. All laws adopted by the Central Rada were cancelled, and the old legal, judicial and administrative structure from the times of Tsarist Russia was restored.

=== Government and administration ===
After several days of negotiations, on 3 May 1918 a new government was appointed under the leadership of Interior Minister Fedir Lyzohub. Most of the Hetmanate's ministerial staff was inherited from the period of Ukrainian People's Republic, but ministers and their deputies were replaced. With the exception of foreign minister Dmytro Doroshenko, none of the new government's members represented Ukrainian political parties, and some belonged to the Russian Constitutional-Democratic Party and even to monarchists. Positions of starost was introduced on governorate and povit level to provide control over local administration. Local officials appointed by the new government generally represented the old pre-revolutionary regime and were hostile to democratic ideas and the Ukrainian national movement. Their actions contradicted the hetman's official declarations, which denied his reactionary plans.

In the environment of occupation by Central Powers, the hetman's administration existed in parallel with the military administrations of Germany and Austria-Hungary, and the real power in the country belonged to the German staff headed by general Eichhorn and his deputy Wilhelm Groener. On the location, power belonged to Central Powers garrisons and their headquarters. Local government institutions were disbanded, and functions of pre-revolutionary zemstvo organs and city dumas were restored. According to a law adopted on 9 August, local militsiya was dissolved and replaced with the "State Guard" subordinate to the Ministry of Interior. The new law on citizenship, adopted on 2 July, abolished the previous decrees of Central Rada and reduced the requirements for naturalization for Russians and other ethnic minorities. On 5 September a new electoral law was adopted, introducing zemstvo elections according to franchise system, and on 23 September a similar law was issued for elections to city dumas.

On 14 June a temporary law allowed the sale and purchase of land in limited amounts or with special permission of the agricultural ministry. On 15 July land committees were created on the basis of previous Russian imperial practices, and on 23 August the State Land Bank was established in order to facilitate the liquidation of large land estates through purchase of plots. These laws recognized the right of landowners to their land and provided them the right to receive compensation for its sale from the state budget.

=== Administrative divisions ===
Administrative and political map of Ukraine during 1917 and 1918

Prior to the formation of the Ukrainian State, the Ukrainian People's Republic (UPR) had passed on 6 March 1918 the law on the division of Ukraine into zemlias, which was to replace the earlier Imperial Russian system of administration. Instead of the territory of the UPR being divided into several governorates and those being divided into uezds, the state was to be divided into 32 zemlias (Ukrainian: земля), with lower level subdivisions being volosts (Ukrainian: волость) and hromadas (Ukrainian: громада).

However, in his Manifesto to the Ukrainian People, Skoropadsky declared that all prior laws and decrees of the Rada to be null, thus restoring the basic principle of the earlier division of the state.

According to the Treaty of Brest-Litovsk, Ukraine had gained ownership of the territory of the former Pinsk, Mozyr and Rechitsa uezds. While the UPR had included these into the Volhynia Governorate and Kholm Governorate, they instead formed a separate administrative subdivision in the Ukrainian State, the Polisia okruha (Ukrainian: округа), centred in Mazyr.

=== Higher-level administrative units ===
==== Governorates ====
- Kiev Governorate, Capital — C. Kiev
- Chernigov Governorate, Capital — C. Chernigov
- Kharkov Governorate, Capital — C. Kharkov
- Podolia Governorate, Capital — C. Vinnitsa
- Poltava Governorate, Capital — C. Poltava
- Volhynia Governorate, Capital — C. Zhitomir
- Kholm Governorate, Capital — C. Berestia
- Yekaterinoslav Governorate, Capital — C. Yekaterinoslav
- Kherson Governorate, Capital — C. Kherson

==== Okruhy ====
- Poliska okruha, Capital — C. Mozyr
- Tavriiska okruha, Capital — C. Berdiansk

==== Others ====
- Crimean Regional Government, Capital — C. Simferopol (dependent on Ukraine, negotiations were underway for its direct accession)
- Kuban People's Republic, Capital — C. Yekaterinodar (negotiations were held about unification with the Ukrainian State)

=== Uezd elders ===
Kiev Governorate:

Uezds	Elders
Kanevsky uezd	M. Hryhor'yiv
Berdichev uezd	M. Kuznyetsov
Zvenigorodka uezd	Mashyr Ivan, F. Zumberov
Umansky uezd	I. Soltyk, later - G. Mikhailov
Kanevsky uezd	I. Nedashkovsky, later — M. Kyrychenko
Cherkassy uezd	M. Kulish, later — P. Korolev
Radomyslsky uezd	S. Onishchenko, later - V. Bogdanov
Tarashchansky uezd	V. Dubynenko, later - V. Stein
Chigirinsky uezd	V. Bialotsky, later - P. Serebriakov
Lipovetsky uezd	I. Voloshinov, later - D. Nosenko
Vasilkovsky uezd	M. Yablonsky, later - V. Trotsky, R. Keichel
Skvirsky uezd	A. Laskin

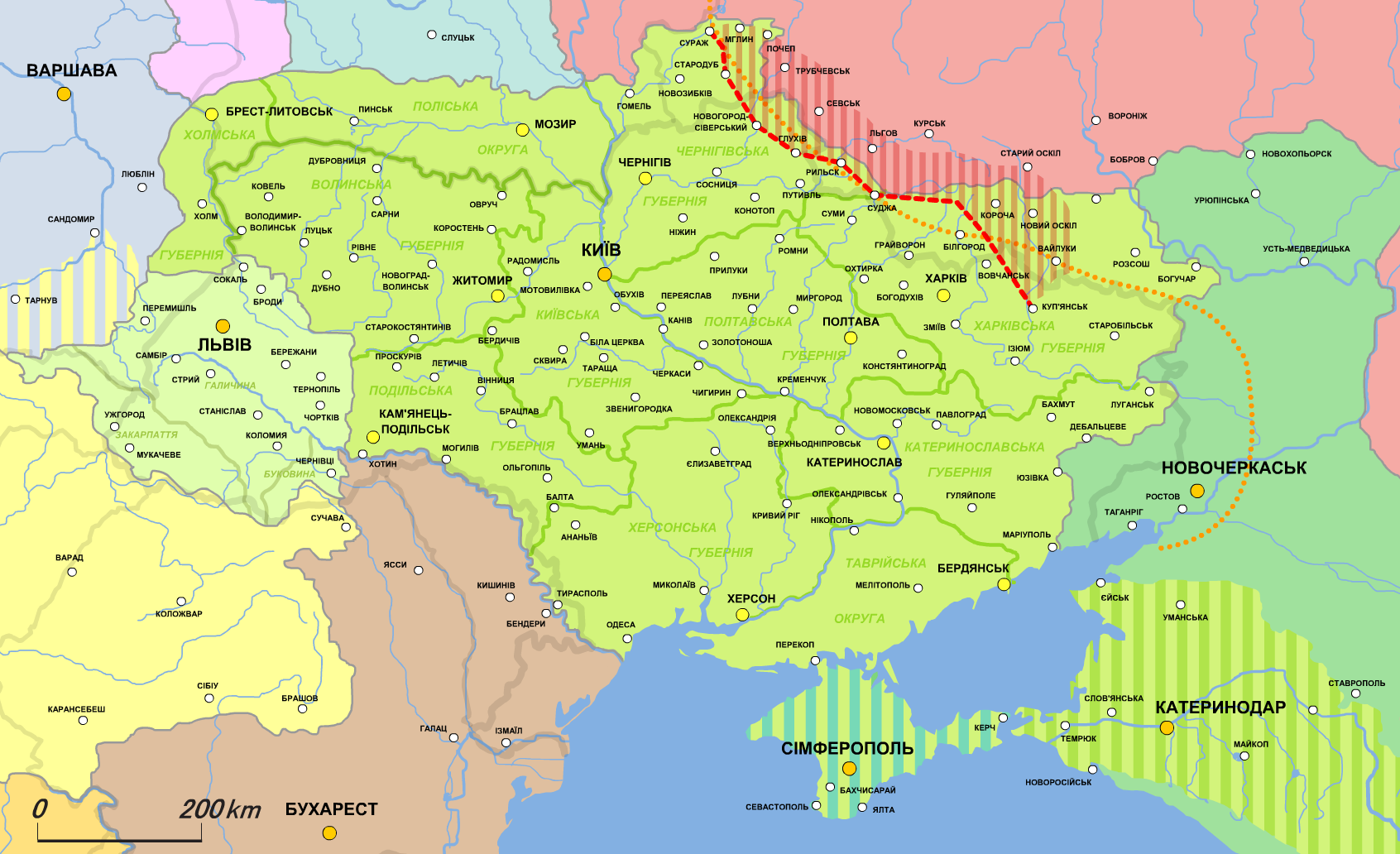
Ukrainian State (May—November 1918): Ukrainian State Crimean Regional Government Kuban People's Republic WUPR (19.X.1918) Almighty Don Host Belarusian People's Republic Lithuania Republic of Poland Austria-Hungary Kingdom of Romania Kingdom of Serbia Soviet Russia

Podolia Governorate:

Uezds	Elders
Mogilev-Podolsky Uezd	Yevhen Semenovich Brazul-Breshkovsky, later L. Rafalsky
Vinnitsky uezd	P. Rennenkampf, later — Pylyp Gusakov
Proskurovsky uezd	V. Stolyarov
Ushitsky uezd	S. Bodysko
Kamenets-Podolsky uezd	S. Vasyliev, later - O. Poderny
Litinsky uezd	Oleksandr Ksenofontovich Lypkin
Letichevsky uezd	Colonel Solovyov, later - O. Pototsky
Bratslavsky uezd	Otaman Kyrychenko, later Vrublevsky
Olgopolsky uezd	V. Leontiev, later - A. Titarenko
Baltsky uezd	I. Bordyuzhevych
Gaysinsky uezd	I. Sinokosov
Yampolsky uezd	E. Kryzhanivskyi, later — M. Hanko
Khotinsky uezd	O. Sugarenko, later — P. Izbitsky

Volhynia Governorate:

Uezds	Elders
Dubensky uezd	D. Prybylsky
Vladimir-Volynsky uezd	V. Pushchin
Zhitomirsky uezd	Arndt Ivan Yulianovich
Izyaslavsky uezd	M. Shabelsky
Kremenetsky uezd	M. Schmidt
Kovelsky uezd	O. Nikitin
Lutsky uezd	M. Lobachevsky, later - F. Schlemmer
Novograd-Volynsky uezd	L. Brodskyi
Ovruchsky uezd	O. Lalevich
Ostrozhsky uezd	K. Kurzenkov
Rivensky uezd	Y. Maksymovich
Starokonstantinovsky uezd	R. Rzhevsky

== Military ==
=== Army ===
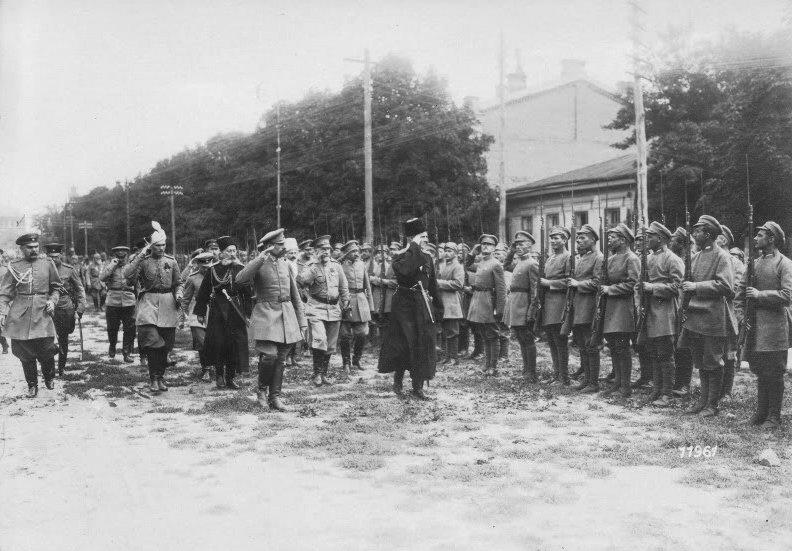
Skoropadsky inspecting troops from the Greycoat Division

Reluctant to support the emergence of a self-sufficient Ukrainian force, German military authorities dissolved several Ukrainian units, including the Blue Coat Division formed form former prisoners of war, as well as the Sich Riflemen. Among units inherited from the previous period, only the Separate Zaporizhian Division and several smaller units stationed on the borders were preserved. The reestablishment of Sich Riflemen was allowed by Germans only in September after negotiations with the hetman. On 24 July 1918 the Law on General Conscription was adopted, establishing the ground for creation of officers' corps. In October 1918 recruitment to the so-called Officers' Corps was started, with most of its members representing Russian officers. Similar units composed of Russian volunteers were also established in many cities. In the same months Skoropadsky issued a universal on the reestablishment of Cossack troops through recruitment of wealthy peasants, but it was never realized due to the following uprising.

After the conclusion of the Treaty of Brest, in March 1918 the so-called Greycoat Division was formed. The unit, known under that name due to its grey-coloured uniforms, consisted of ethnic Ukrainian prisoners of war from the Russian Army, who had been released from prison camps such as Freistadt and Josefstadt and directed to Volodymyr-Volynskyi, where they were trained by an Austrian military mission headed by Slavko Kvaternik. Officially known as the First Riflemen-Cossack Division, Greycoats consisted of four infantry regiments numbering 13 sotnias (companies), one artillery division, one cavalry company, one engineering company and auxiliary formations. As of 1 July 1918, 6,000 regular Cossacks and 140 officers served in the division.

Greycoats were initially commanded by Ivan Perlyk, a former officer of the Russian Army, but he was removed from command in August 1918. On 28 August the division was officially transferred to the Ukrainian State by Austrian command, and on 1 September paraded before the hetman in Kyiv. Soon thereafter the Greycoats were directed to northern Chernihiv Governorate and stationed near Konotop. In October the division was demobilized and numbered circa 1200 soldiers, including 250 officers. During the Anti-Hetman Uprising Greycoats joined the Directory, and its membership grew up to 6,000 soldiers. Now known as the Grey Division, during the winter of 1918-1919 the unit fought against Bolshevik troops, and after suffering heavy losses was transferred to the Polish front. Eventually developed into a corps under command of Oleksandr Osetsky, in May 1919 the division had most of its soldiers captured as prisoners by Poles, and only a small part of it continued fighting until November 1920 as part of Volyn Division.

In July 1918 Skoropadsky's government instituted the formation of Serdiuk Division, which inherited its name from the preceding units of the Ukrainian People's Army, themselves named after the Hetman's guard of the Cossack Hetmanate. Serdiuks were organized in a matter similar to Russian guard regiments and were recruited from young men, both volunteers and mobilized servicemen, most of them stemming from reach peasant classes of Left-bank Ukraine. By October 1918 the Serdiuk Division counted around 5,000 soldiers and was commanded by colonel Klymenko. During the Anti-Hetman Uprising, most of Serdiuks deserted and joined the Directorate forces, with part of them entering the ranks of Sich Riflemen.

=== Navy ===
Following the February Revolution, Ukrainian national movement achieved great influence among servicemen of the Black Sea Fleet, where ethnic Ukrainians constituted 80% of the personnel. Military councils of several ships voiced their support for the Central Rada, and in January 1918 a kurin of Black Sea marines took part in the battles against the Bolsheviks in Kyiv. According to a law adopted on 14 January 1918, control over the Black Sea Fleet was transferred to the Ukrainian People's Republic.

In the course of the Crimea operation, on 29 April 1918 the Black Sea Fleet in Sevastopol raised the Ukrainian flag over its ships, and appealed to Germans to stop their advance. However, after the Germans refused the offer, part of the navy hoisted the Russian naval flag and moved to Novorossiysk, where they were scuttled. The rest of the fleet was interned by Germans, who transferred them to Ukraine only in November 1918. After the German retreat those ships were captured by the Entente and appropriated by its member states.

== Economy and finance ==
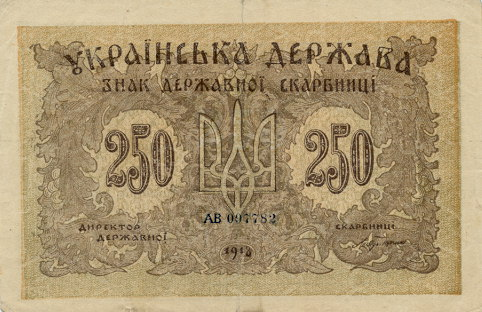
250 karbovanets banknote of the Ukrainian State, 1918

=== Financial policies ===
In 1918 the Hetmanate's government approved the first state budget in Ukrainian history. Sporting a deficit of over 2 billion karbovanets, its needs were to be covered by the issue of banknotes and credit notes produced by the State Bank of Ukraine and the State Treasury. Along with hryvnia, other curencies, such as locally issued karbovanets, rubles, golden and silver coins of the Russian Empire, German marks and Austro-Hungarian kronen were used in the Ukrainian State. In order to control the allocation of funds and fight against corruption, Skoropadsky's government reestablished the activities of state control. According to bilateral agreements, Ukrainian State provided Germany and Austria-Hungary with two separate loans amounting to 200 million karbovanets each, with interest rates from those sums going to the Ukrainian budget.

=== Agriculture ===
Following the arrival of Austrian and German troops, Ukraine experienced a period of agrarian reaction, with landowners engaging in revenge and punishment against peasants with the aid of occupying forces. This contributed to the spread of peasant revolts, especially in the areas of Kyiv and Zaporizhzhia, which were subdued by German troops.

== Culture and religion ==
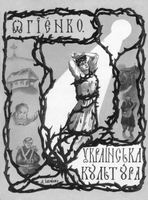
Brochure Ukrainian Culture published by Ivan Ohiienko in 1918

According to the "Laws on the Provisional State System of Ukraine", the leading position in the country was occupied by the Christian Orthodox faith. At the same time, citizens of Ukraine who belonged to other denominations had the right to profess their religion and rites.

The Russian Orthodox Church, and later the Ukrainian Autocephalous Orthodox Church, dominated in Central and Eastern Ukraine. However, in Western Ukraine there was friction between Orthodox, Greek Catholics, Roman Catholics and Jews. In the conflicts, the Ministry of Confessions of the Ukrainian State and the Council of Ministers morally and materially supported the Orthodox clergy.

On 25 June, the government allocated 3 million rubles to help priests who moved to Volhynia, Kholmshchyna, Grodno, Podolia, and Polesia, which were annexed to the Ukrainian State. On 2 July, 120,000 roubles were allocated for the maintenance of the Orthodox clergy in the lands of Kholmshchyna, Podlachia and Polesia.

During the existence of the Ukrainian State, its government worked on the development of schooling and contributed to the opening of new universities in Kyiv and Kamianets-Podilskyi and Katerynoslav, as well as the establishment of a faculty of history and philology in Poltava. Chairs of Ukrainian language, history and literature were introduced in many higher educational establishments, and several cultural institutions including a national gallery, national archive and national museum were founded. National Academy of Sciences of Ukraine, first envisioned by the Central Rada, also saw its emergence under the Ukrainian State. During the summer of 1918, 50 Ukrainian gymnasiums were organized, with talented pupils being provided with stipends. A state theatre and a drama school were established in Kyiv. The ministry of Education allocated 2 million karbovanets for the printing of schoolbooks. In general, Ukrainian publishing in 1918 experienced a period of flourishing.

== Bibliography ==
- Pyrih, Ruslan (2016). Дiяльнiсть урядiв гетьманату Павла Скоропадського: персональний вимiр [Actions of the cabinet of Pavlo Skoropadsky's Hetmanate: personal dimension] (in Ukrainian). Медисонт. ISBN 978-966-02-7761-8.
- Dornik, Wolfram (2015). The Emergence of Ukraine: Self-Determination, Occupation, and War in Ukraine, 1917–1922. University of Alberta Press. ISBN 978-1-894865-40-1.
- Hunczak, Taras (1977). The Ukraine, 1917-1921: A Study in Revolution. ISBN 978-0674920095.
- Reshetar, John (1952). The Ukrainian Revolution, 1917-1920: A Study In Nationalism. ISBN 978-1258187910.
- Horak, Stephan (1988). The First Treaty of World War I: Ukraine's Treaty with the Central Powers of February 9, 1918. ISBN 088033133X.
- Subtelny, Orest (1988). Ukraine: A History. Toronto: University of Toronto Press. ISBN 0-8020-5808-6.
- Verstiuk, Vladyslav (1997). Українська Центральна рада: Документи і матеріали [Ukrainian Central Rada: Documents and meterials] (in Ukrainian). Vol. 2. Naukova dumka. ISBN 966-00-0013-8.
- Boyko, Olena (2009). Територія, кордони і адміністративно-територіальний поділ Української Держави гетьмана П. Скоропадського (1918) [Territory, borders and administrative-territorial division of the Ukrainian State of Hetman P. Skoropadsky (1918)] (PDF). Регіональна Історія України [Regional History of Ukraine] (in Ukrainian) (3). Archived from the original (PDF) on 1 July 2015.
- Kyrydon, A. M. (2013). Релігійно-церковне життя в період Гетьманату: проблемне поле взаємодії [Religious and church life during the Hetmanate period: the problematic area of interaction] (PDF). Національна Та Історична Пам'ять [National and Historical Memory] (in Ukrainian) (7): 252–259. Archived from the original (PDF) on 15 March 2022.
- Hai-Nyzhnyk, Pavlo (2014). "Викрадення банкіра А. Доброго в квітні 1918 року (реконструкція та аналіз подій)" [The Abduction of the Banker A. Dobryi in April 1918 (Reconstruction and Analysis of Events)]. Наукові Записки. Серія: Педагогічні Науки (in Ukrainian).
