= Lev Bienstok =

- Born: 6 April 1836; Lukachi, Volhynian Governorate, Russian Empire
- Died: 22 October 1894 (aged 58); Jaffa, Mutasarrifate of Jerusalem, Ottoman Empire
- Spouse: Rivka Goldfarb
- Children: Mikhail Bienstok; J. Wladimir Bienstock; Ernestina Veinbaum
- Writing career
- Pen name: L. Uleynikov (Л. Улейникова)

Lev Moiseievich Bienstok (Yiddish: יהודה ליב בינשטאק, romanized: Yehuda Leib Binshtok; 6 April 1836 – 22 October 1894) was a Russian writer, educationist, and communal worker.

== Biography ==
=== Early life and education ===
Bienstok was born to Moshe Avraham Bienstok in Lukachi, Volhynian Governorate. He received his first education in the ḥeder and in the Russian public school at Turin, district of Kovel. In 1847 he entered the government gymnasium at Zhitomir, and the following year the Zhitomir Rabbinical Institute, graduating from the latter in 1858. He was a childhood friend of Sholem Yankev Abramovich, with whom he would later collaborate on a number of literary projects.

He was appointed teacher at the Jewish school of Starokostiantyniv, and acted as rabbi of the Zhitomir community from 1859 to 1862. From 1863 to 1867 he was instructor in the Jewish religion at various gymnasia in Zhitomir.

=== Career ===
In 1867 Bienstok was appointed assistant editor of the Volynskiya Gubernskiya Vyedomosty, the official newspaper of the government of Volhynia, and from 1867 to 1882 was adviser on Jewish matters ('uchony yevrei') to the governor of Volhynia. In 1880 Bienstok settled at St. Petersburg as secretary of the Jewish community there; but after the anti-Jewish riots he returned to Zhitomir, and in 1892 the Russian-Jewish Aid Society for Agriculturists and Artisans of Odessa appointed him as its representative in Jaffa. There he brought order into the affairs of the society, and reported on the condition of the Jewish agricultural settlements of Palestine.

Bienstok was one of the pioneer collaborators of the first Russian-Jewish periodicals, Razsvyet and Sion. He also contributed to the Russian periodicals Moskovskiya Vyedomosti, Russki Vyestnik, Sovremennaya Lyetopis, and others.

== Publications ==
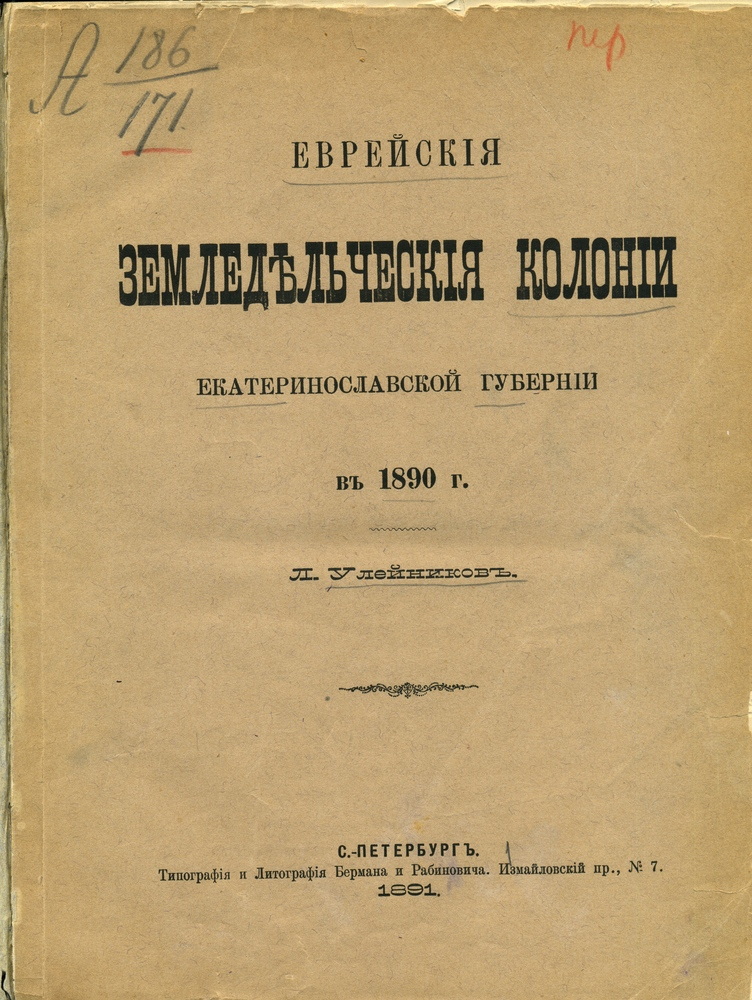
Title page of Yevreiskiya Zemledyelcheskiya Kolonii Yekaterinoslavskoi Gubernii (1890)

Bienstok was the author of Otzy i Dyety ('Fathers and Sons'), a translation of Abramovich's Hebrew novel Avot u-banim, and Yevreiskiya Zemledyelcheskiya Kolonii Yekaterinoslavskoi Gubernii (St. Petersburg, 1890), on the Jewish agricultural colonies of the Yekaterinoslav Governorate. Among his magazine articles on Jewish topics were "Vopros ob Yevreiskikh Uchilishchach," a paper on Jewish schools, in Russki Vyestnik (1866, nos. 11–12); "Yevrei Volynskoi Gubernii," a series of articles on the Jews of the government of Volhynia, and containing information on the ethnography of the Russian Jews (published in the Volhynskiya Gubernskiya Vyedomosti (1867); "Iz Nedavnavo Proshlavo," in the same periodical (1867); "Otkrytoe Pismo U. Aksakovu" in Voskhod (1882, no. 4); "Vtoroe Otkrytoe Pismo Aksakovu," in Russki Kurier (1883, no. 251); and "Vospominanie o Finlyandii," reminiscences of Finland, in Odesski Listok (1883, nos. 187, 189, 201–202).
