= 1st Radio Technical Brigade =

- 1-ша радіотехнічна бригада
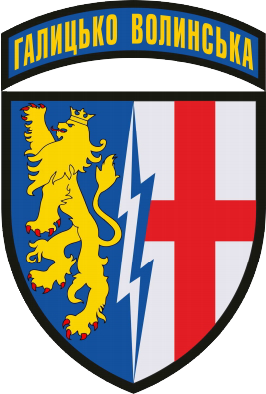
- Unit insignia
- Founded: January 1992
- Country: Ukraine
- Branch: Ukrainian Air Force
- Role: Radar, reconnaissance, air traffic control
- Nickname: "Galicia-Volhynia" Brigade
- Engagements: Russo-Ukrainian war: War in Donbas; Russian invasion of Ukraine

Insignia
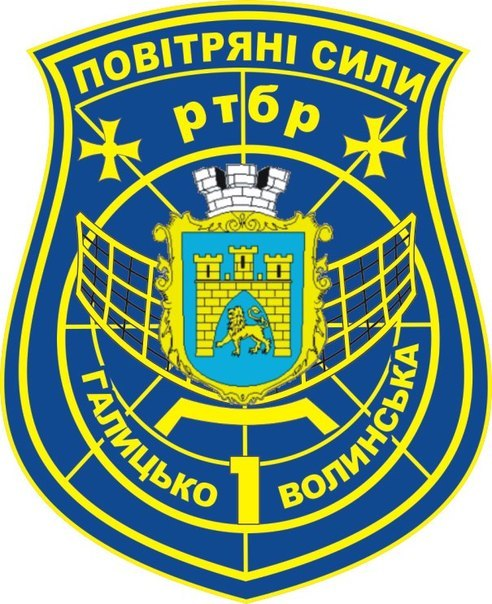
- Former Insignia (1992-2010)

- Former Insignia (2010-2020)

The 1st Radio Technical Brigade "Galicia-Volhynia" is a brigade of the Ukrainian Air Force concerned with radar operations in western Ukraine. It is named in relation to the Kingdom of Galicia–Volhynia.

== History ==
In January 1992, following the dissolution of the Soviet Union, the personnel of the 1st Radio Engineering Brigade of the 68th Air Defense Corps took the oath of loyalty to the Ukrainian people. It was assigned the tasks of conducting radar reconnaissance to ensure timely detection of an enemy air attack, provide information, monitor the flights of civilian aircraft and take measures in case of non-compliance with the rules of Ukrainian airspace in the airspace of western Ukraine.

In 2009, the brigade was given the honorary name of "Galicia-Volhynia".

The Brigade actively performed security tasks during the "Euro 2012" football championship in Ukraine.

The brigade was deployed to eastern Ukraine during the war in Donbas. On 10 February 2015, a serviceman of the brigade (Mykhailo Mykolayovych Ilyashuk), was killed during the bombardment of the airfield in Kramatorsk, Donetsk region, by pro-Russian separatists.

As of 2017, about 740 servicemen of the brigade had taken part in the War in Donbas of which 545 had officially received the status of a participant in combat operations.

In April 2021, the brigade's new insignia was criticized by a Ukrainian heraldry society, due to its depiction of the coat of arms of Volhynia as a red cross on a silver background, rather than the traditional silver cross on a red background, which the society said was a "gross error".

On 27 February 2022, during the Russian invasion of Ukraine, a wave of missile coming from Belarusian airspace struck a military base near the city of Volodymyr in the Volyn region, killing three soldiers, at least one of whom was a member of the 1st Brigade.

== Commanders ==
- Colonel Serhiy Dmytrovych Vishnevskyi (2002–2005)

== Sources ==
- «Народна армія» No. 4 (4856)
- Військові частини Повітряних Сил за родами військ
- 1 радіотехнічна бригада урочисто поставила до строю Бойовий Прапор
