= Flag of Volyn Oblast =

Flag of Ukrainian oblast

- Proportion: 2:3
- Adopted: 1997

The Flag of Volyn Oblast is the official flag of Volyn Oblast, an oblast in Ukraine.

In the center on a red (color of ripe cherry) background is an isosceles cross of white (silver) color, touching the ends of the edges of the flag. In the upper left corner is one of the oldest versions of the historical crosses of Volhynia of the 15th to the 18th century centuries (so-called Cross pattée).

The flag is based on the historical traditions of the region and was developed and adopted on the initiative of the chairman of the Volyn Regional Society of Local Historians Gennady Bondarenko.

== See also ==
- Volyn oblast
- Coat of arms of Volyn Oblast
- The similar flag of Denmark

== Sources ==
- Українське геральдичне товариство
- Офіційний сайт Волинської ОДА
- Гречило А. Сучасні символи областей України. — К., Львів, 2008. — С. 14.
