= Oleh Skvira =

Ukrainian footballer

Personal information
- Date of birth: 23 June 2000 (age 26)
- Place of birth: Volyn Oblast, Ukraine
- Height: 1.75 m (5 ft 9 in)
- Position: Midfielder

Team information
- Current team: FC Trostianets (amateur)

Youth career
- 2012–2017: BRW-VIK Volodymyr-Volynskyi
- 2017–2018: Munkacs Mukacheve
- 2018–2019: Volyn Lutsk

Senior career*
Years	Team	Apps	(Gls)
2019-2020	Votrans Lutsk (amateur)		
2020	Energetik-BGU Minsk	1	(0)
2021–2024	FC Volodymyr (amateur)		
2025-	FC Trostianets (amateur)		
- * Club domestic league appearances and goals as of 31 December 2020

Oleh Skvira (Ukrainian: Олег Сквіра; born 23 June 2000) is a Ukrainian professional football player.
