= Starokonstantinovsky Uyezd =

- Uezd
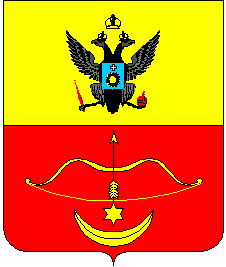
- Coat of arms

- Location in the Volhynian Governorate
- Country: Russian Empire
- Governorate: Volhynia
- Established: 1781
- Abolished: 1923
- Capital: Starokostiantyniv

Population (1897)
  - Total: 193,889

Starokonstantinovsky Uyezd (Староконстантиновский уезд) was one of the subdivisions of the Volhynian Governorate of the Russian Empire. It was situated in the southern part of the governorate. Its administrative centre was Starokostiantyniv.

== Demographics ==
At the time of the Russian Empire Census of 1897, Starokonstantinovsky Uyezd had a population of 193,889. Of these, 76.9% spoke Ukrainian, 14.3% Yiddish, 5.5% Polish, 2.8% Russian, 0.2% Tatar and 0.1% German as their native language.
