= Volyn Oblast =

Oblast (region) of Ukraine

Coordinates: 50°44′29″N 25°21′14″E

Volyn Oblast Волинська область
- Oblast
- Volynska oblast
- Flag Coat of arms
- Nickname: Волинь (Volhynia)
- Interactive map of Volyn Oblast in Ukraine
- Country: Ukraine
- Administrative centre: Lutsk

Government
  - Governor: Roman Romanyuk (acting)
  - Oblast council: 64 seats
  - Chairperson: Hryhoriy Nedopad

Area
  - Total: 20,144 km^{2} (7,778 sq mi)
  - Rank: Ranked 20th

Population (2022)
  - Total: 1,021,356 ▼
  - Rank: Ranked 24th
  - Density: 50.703/km^{2} (131.32/sq mi)

GDP
  - Total: ₴ 93 billion (€2.4 billion)
  - Per capita: ₴ 90,331 (€2,300)
- Time zone: UTC+2 (EET)
  - Summer (DST): UTC+3 (EEST)
- Postal code: 43xxx-45xxx
- Area code: +380-33
- ISO 3166 code: UA-07
- Raions: 4
- Hromadas: 54
- HDI (2022): 0.722 high
- FIPS 10-4: UP24
- NUTS statistical regions of Ukraine: UA81
- Website: www.voladm.gov.ua

Volyn Oblast (Ukrainian: Волинська область, romanized: Volynska oblast) or simply Volyn (Ukrainian: Волинь), is an oblast (province) in northwestern Ukraine. It borders Rivne Oblast to the east, Lviv Oblast to the south, Poland to the west and Belarus to the north. Its administrative centre is Lutsk. Kovel is the westernmost town and the last station in Ukraine on the rail line running from Kyiv to Warsaw. The population is 1,021,356 (2022 estimate).

== History ==
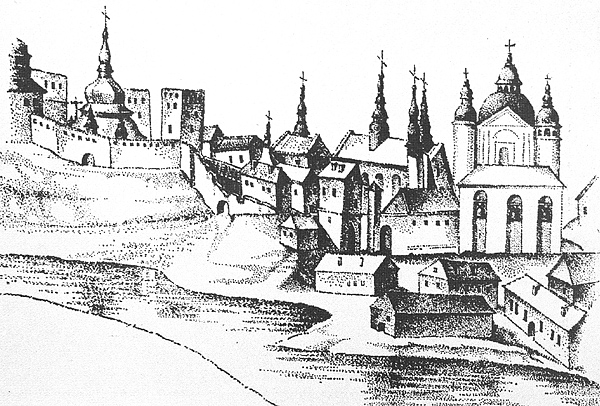
Lutsk in the 18th century

Volyn was once part of the Kievan Rus' before becoming an independent local principality and an integral part of the Kingdom of Galicia–Volhynia, one of Kievan Rus' successor states. In the 15th century, the area came under the control of the neighbouring Grand Duchy of Lithuania, in 1569 passing over to Poland and then in 1795, until World War I, to the Russian Empire where it was a part of the Volynskaya Guberniya. In the interwar period, most of the territory, organized as Wołyń Voivodeship was under Polish control.

In 1939, when Poland was invaded and divided by Nazi Germany and the Soviet Union following the Molotov–Ribbentrop pact, Volyn was joined to Soviet Ukraine, and on December 4, 1939, the oblast was organized.

Many Ukrainians rejoiced at the "reunification", but the Polish minority suffered a cruel fate. Thousands of Poles, especially retired Polish officers and intelligentsia were deported to Siberia and other areas in the depths of the Soviet Union. A high proportion of these deportees died in the extreme conditions of Soviet labour camps and most were never able to return to Volyn again.

In 1941, Volyn along with the Soviet Union was invaded by the Nazi Germany's Barbarossa Offensive. Nazis completed their holocaust of the Jews of Volhynia in late 1942.

Partisan activity started in Volyn in 1941, soon after German occupation. Partisans were involved in the Rail War against German supply lines and were known for their efficiency in gathering intelligence and for sabotage. The region formed the basis of several networks and many members of the local population served with the partisans. The Poles in the area became part of the Polish Home Army, which often undertook operations with the partisan movement.

UPA initially supported Nazi Germany which had in turn supported them with financing and weaponry before the start of World War II. Many served in the various RONA and SS units. Once they became disillusioned with the Nazi program, they independently began to target all non-Ukrainians (Poles, Jews, Russians, among others) for extermination. Some 30,000 to 60,000 Poles, Czechs, remaining Jews, and Ukrainians who tried to help others escape (Polish sources gave even higher figures) and later, around 2,000 or more Ukrainians were killed in retaliation (see Massacres of Poles in Volhynia).

In January 1944, the Red Army recaptured the territory from the Nazis.

In the immediate aftermath of World War II, the Polish Soviet border was redrawn based on the Curzon line. Volyn, along with the neighbouring provinces became an integral part of the Ukrainian SSR. Most Poles who remained in the eastern region were forced to leave to the Recovered Territories of western Poland (the former easternmost provinces of Germany) whose German population had been expelled in accordance with the Potsdam Agreement.

The area underwent rapid industrialisation including the construction of the Lutsk automobile factory (LuAZ). Nevertheless, the area remains one of the most rural throughout the former Soviet Union.

== Demography ==
According to the 2001 Ukrainian census, ethnic Ukrainians accounted for 96.9% of the population of Volyn Oblast, and ethnic Russians for 2.4%.

=== Language ===
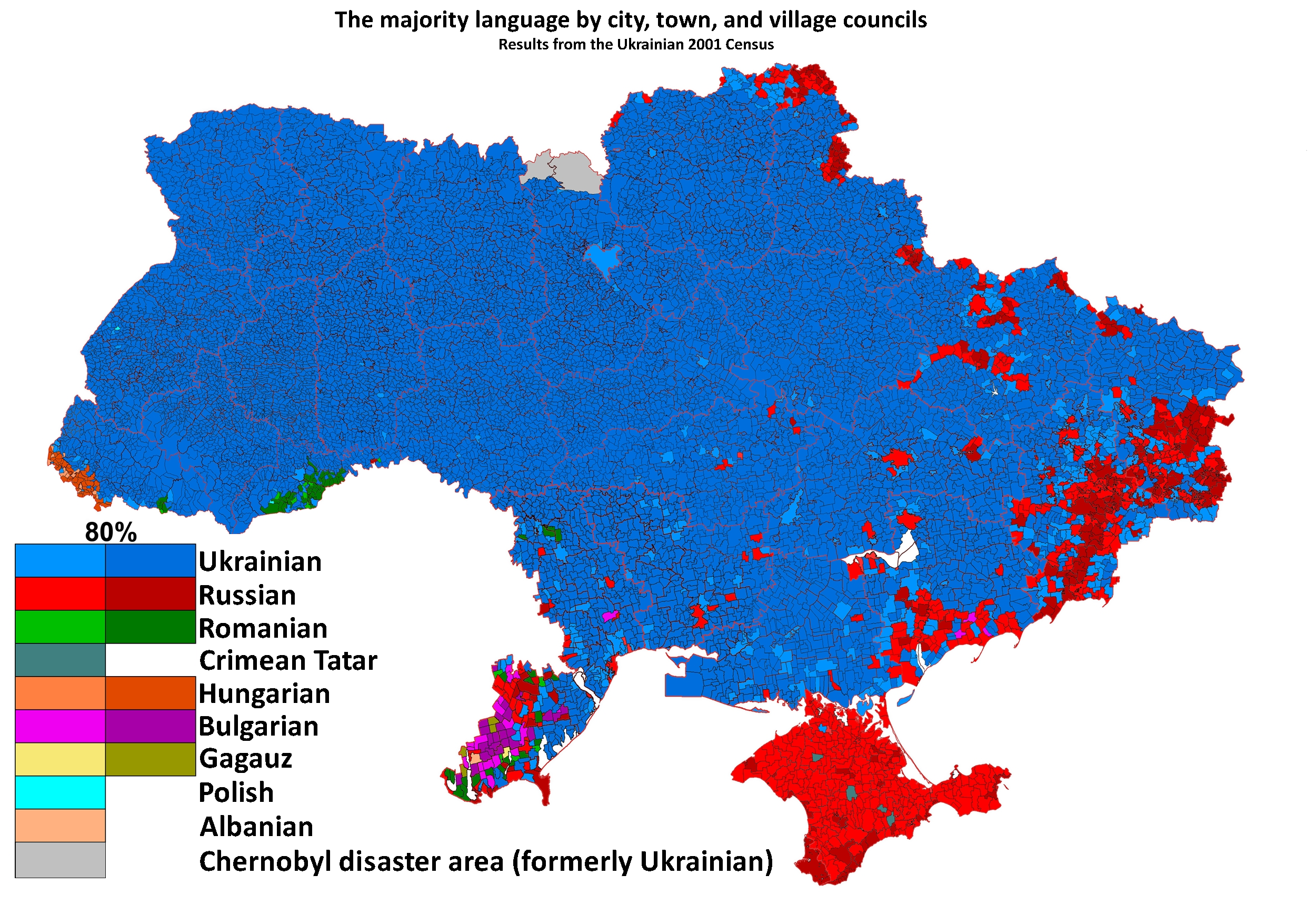
According to the 2001 Ukrainian census, Ukrainian was the native language for over 97% of Volyn Oblast's population: it was the dominant language in all of the city, town, and village councils of the oblast.

The Russification of Ukraine carried out during the Soviet era had little to no effect on the Volyn Oblast: the share of Ukrainian-speakers in the region in 1959—1989 fluctuated around 94—95%. Native language of the population of Volyn Oblast according to the results of population censuses:

	1959	1970	1989	2001
Ukrainian	94.0%	94.8%	94.5%	97.3%
Russian	5.0%	4.8%	5.1%	2.5%
Other	1.0%	0.4%	0.4%	0.2%

Native language of the population of the raions, cities, and city councils of Volyn Oblast according to the 2001 Ukrainian census:

	Ukrainian	Russian
Volyn Oblast	97.3%	2.5%
City of Lutsk	92.9%	6.8%
City of Volodymyr	94.5%	5.2%
City of Kovel	95.8%	3.9%
Novovolynsk (city council)	94.4%	5.2%
Volodymyr-Volynskyi Raion (in pre-2020 borders)	98.8%	1.0%
Horokhiv Raion	99.2%	0.6%
Ivanychi Raion	99.0%	0.8%
Kamin-Kashyrskyi Raion (in pre-2020 borders)	99.6%	0.3%
Kivertsi Raion	98.6%	1.2%
Kovel Raion (in pre-2020 borders)	99.0%	0.8%
Lokachi Raion	99.4%	0.5%
Lutsk Raion (in pre-2020 borders)	98.8%	1.0%
Liubeshiv Raion	99.5%	0.3%
Liuboml Raion	99.1%	0.8%
Manevychi Raion	99.3%	0.6%
Ratne Raion	99.2%	0.5%
Rozhyshche Raion	99.0%	0.8%
Stara Vyzhivka Raion	99.5%	0.4%
Turiisk Raion	99.1%	0.8%
Shatsk Raion	98.7%	0.9%

Ukrainian is the only official language on the whole territory of Volyn Oblast.

On 20 December 2018, a moratorium on the public use of Russian-language cultural products was imposed in Volyn Oblast by a decision of the Volyn Oblast Council.

According to a poll conducted by Rating from 16 November to 10 December 2018 as part of the project «Portraits of Regions», 85% of the residents of Volyn Oblast believed that the Ukrainian language should be the only state language on the entire territory of Ukraine. 10% believed that Ukrainian should be the only state language, while Russian should be the second official language in some regions of the country. 3% believed that Russian should become the second state language of the country. 2% found it difficult to answer.

On 13 July 2023, Volyn Oblast Council approved the «Comprehensive Programme for the Development and Functioning of the Ukrainian Language in Volyn Oblast for 2023—2026», the main objectives of which are to strengthen the positions of the Ukrainian language in various spheres of public life in the oblast and to Ukrainianize the refugees from other regions of Ukraine.

According to the research of the Content Analysis Centre, conducted from 15 August to 15 September 2024, the topic of which was the ratio of Ukrainian and Russian languages in the Ukrainian segment of social media, 89.5% of posts from Volyn Oblast were written in Ukrainian (88.3% in 2023, 88.8% in 2022, 51.3% in 2020), while 10.5% were written in Russian (11.7% in 2023, 11.2% in 2022, 48.7% in 2020).

After Ukraine declared independence in 1991, Volyn Oblast, as well as Ukraine as a whole, experienced a gradual Ukrainization of the education system, which had been Russified during the Soviet era. Dynamics of the ratio of the languages of instruction in general secondary education institutions in Volyn Oblast:

Language of instruction, % of pupils	1991— 1992	1992— 1993	1993— 1994	1994— 1995	1995— 1996	2000— 2001	2005— 2006	2007— 2008	2010— 2011	2012— 2013	2015— 2016	2018— 2019	2021— 2022	2022— 2023
Ukrainian	94.6%	95.6%	96.7%	97.3%	98.0%	99.0%	99.7%	99.8%	99.8%	99.8%	99.9%	99.9%	100.0%	100.0%
Russian	5.4%	4.4%	3.3%	2.7%	2.0%	1.0%	0.3%	0.2%	0.2%	0.2%	0.1%	0.1%	—	—

According to the State Statistics Service of Ukraine, in the 2023—2024 school year, all 140,494 pupils in general secondary education institutions in Volyn Oblast were studying in classes where Ukrainian was the language of instruction.

== Historical sites ==
The following historical-cultural sites were nominated in 2007 for the Seven Wonders of Ukraine.

- Upper Castle
- Volodymyr historical-cultural complex
- Villa-museum of Lesia Ukrainka

=== Relics ===
- Painting of the Kholm's Virgin Mary

== Politics ==
Former Chairmen of Oblast Council

- 2006 – Vasyl Dmytruk Lytvyn's Bloc
- 2006 – Anatoliy Hrytsiuk

== Subdivisions ==
The Volyn Oblast is administratively subdivided into 4 raions (districts).

Name	Center	Center population (thousand people)	Area (km^{2})	Population (thousand people)	Hromadas
Volodymyr Raion	Volodymyr	38,9	2558,2	174,7	11
Kamin-Kashyrskyi Raion	Kamin-Kashyrskyi	12,5	4693,4	132,4	5
Kovel Raion	Kovel	68,2	7647,9	271	23
Lutsk Raion	Lutsk	221,1	5247,8	457,3	15

Volyn Oblast districts (since 2020)

Hromada	Type	Center	Raion
Lutsk	city	Lutsk	Lutsk
Volodymyr	city	Volodymyr	Volodymyr
Kovel	city	Kovel	Kovel
Novovolynsk	city	Novovolynsk	Volodymyr
Ustyluh	city	Ustyluh	Volodymyr
Zymne	village	Zymne	Volodymyr
Ovadne	village	Ovadne	Volodymyr
Berestechko	city	Berestechko	Lutsk
Horokhiv	city	Horokhiv	Lutsk
Marianivka	town	Marianivka	Lutsk
Ivanychi	town	Ivanychi	Volodymyr
Lytovezh	village	Lytovezh	Volodymyr
Pavlivka	village	Pavlivka	Volodymyr
Poromiv	village	Poromiv	Volodymyr
Kamin-Kashyrskyi	city	Kamin-Kashyrskyi	Kamin-Kashyrskyi
Soshychne	village	Soshychne	Kamin-Kashyrskyi
Kivertsi	city	Kivertsi	Lutsk
Olyka	city	Olyka	Lutsk
Tsuman	town	Tsuman	Lutsk
Holoby	town	Holoby	Kovel
Lublynets	town	Lublynets	Kovel
Velytsk	village	Velytsk	Kovel
Dubove	village	Dubove	Kovel
Kolodiazhne	village	Kolodiazhne	Kovel
Povorsk	village	Povorsk	Kovel
Lokachi	town	Lokachi	Volodymyr
Zaturtsi	village	Zaturtsi	Volodymyr
Torchyn	town	Torchyn	Lutsk
Boratyn	village	Boratyn	Lutsk
Horodyshche	village	Horodyshche	Lutsk
Pidhaitsi	village	Pidhaitsi	Lutsk
Liubeshiv	town	Liubeshiv	Kamin-Kashyrskyi
Liuboml	city	Liuboml	Kovel
Holovne	town	Holovne	Kovel
Vyshniv	village	Vyshniv	Kovel
Rivne	village	Rivne	Kovel
Kolky	town	Kolky	Lutsk
Manevychi	town	Manevychi	Kamin-Kashyrskyi
Prylisne	village	Prylisne	Kamin-Kashyrskyi
Zabolottia	town	Zabolottia	Kovel
Ratne	town	Ratne	Kovel
Velymche	village	Velymche	Kovel
Zabrody	village	Zabrody	Kovel
Samary	village	Samary	Kovel
Rozhyshche	city	Rozhyshche	Lutsk
Dorosyni	village	Dorosyni	Lutsk
Kopachivka	village	Kopachivka	Lutsk
Stara Vyzhivka	town	Stara Vyzhivka	Kovel
Dubechne	village	Dubechne	Kovel
Serekhovychi	village	Serekhovychi	Kovel
Smidyn	village	Smidyn	Kovel
Lukiv	town	Lukiv	Kovel
Turiisk	town	Turiisk	Kovel
Shatsk	town	Shatsk	Kovel

== Notable people ==
- Oleh Skvira (born 2000), Ukrainian professional football player
- Vitaliy Kvartsyanyi (born 1953), Ukrainian football manager and former player
- Lesya Ukrainka (born February 25, 1871), Ukrainian poet and playwright

== Gallery ==
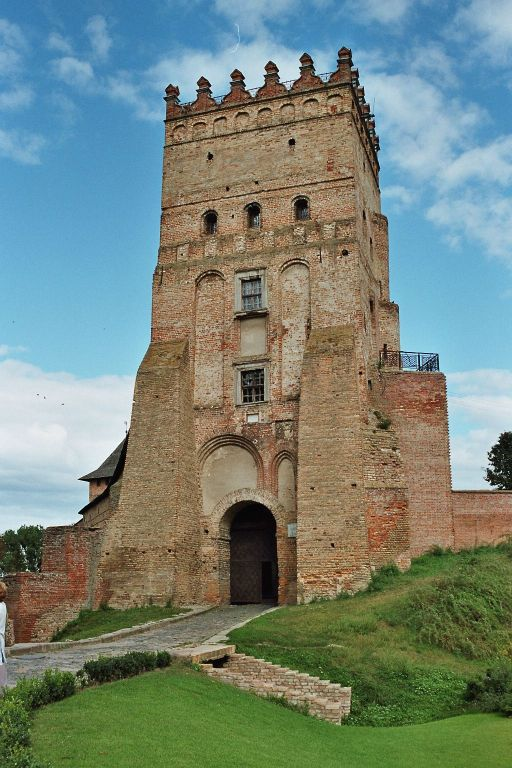
Lutsk Castle

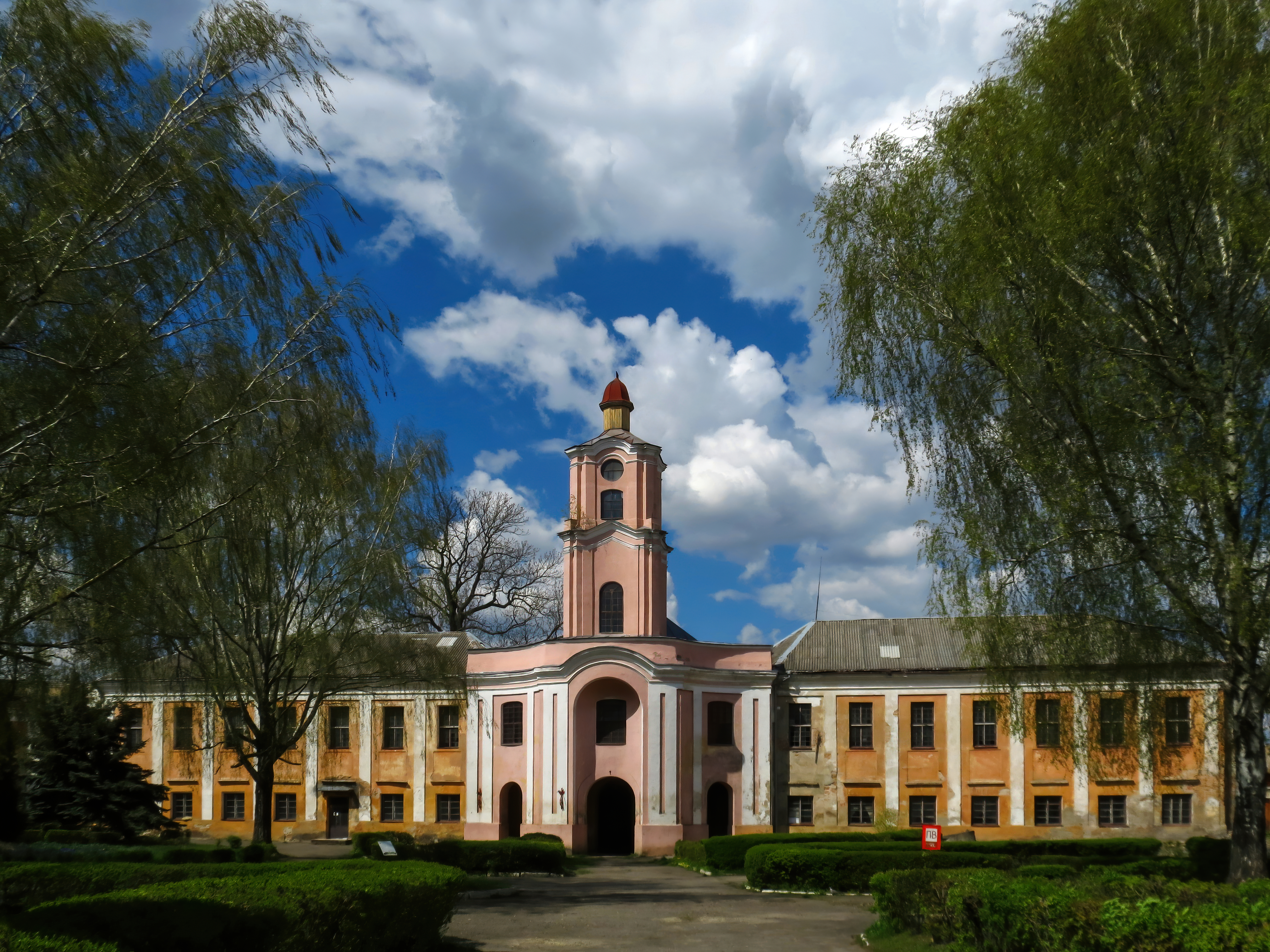
Olyka Castle

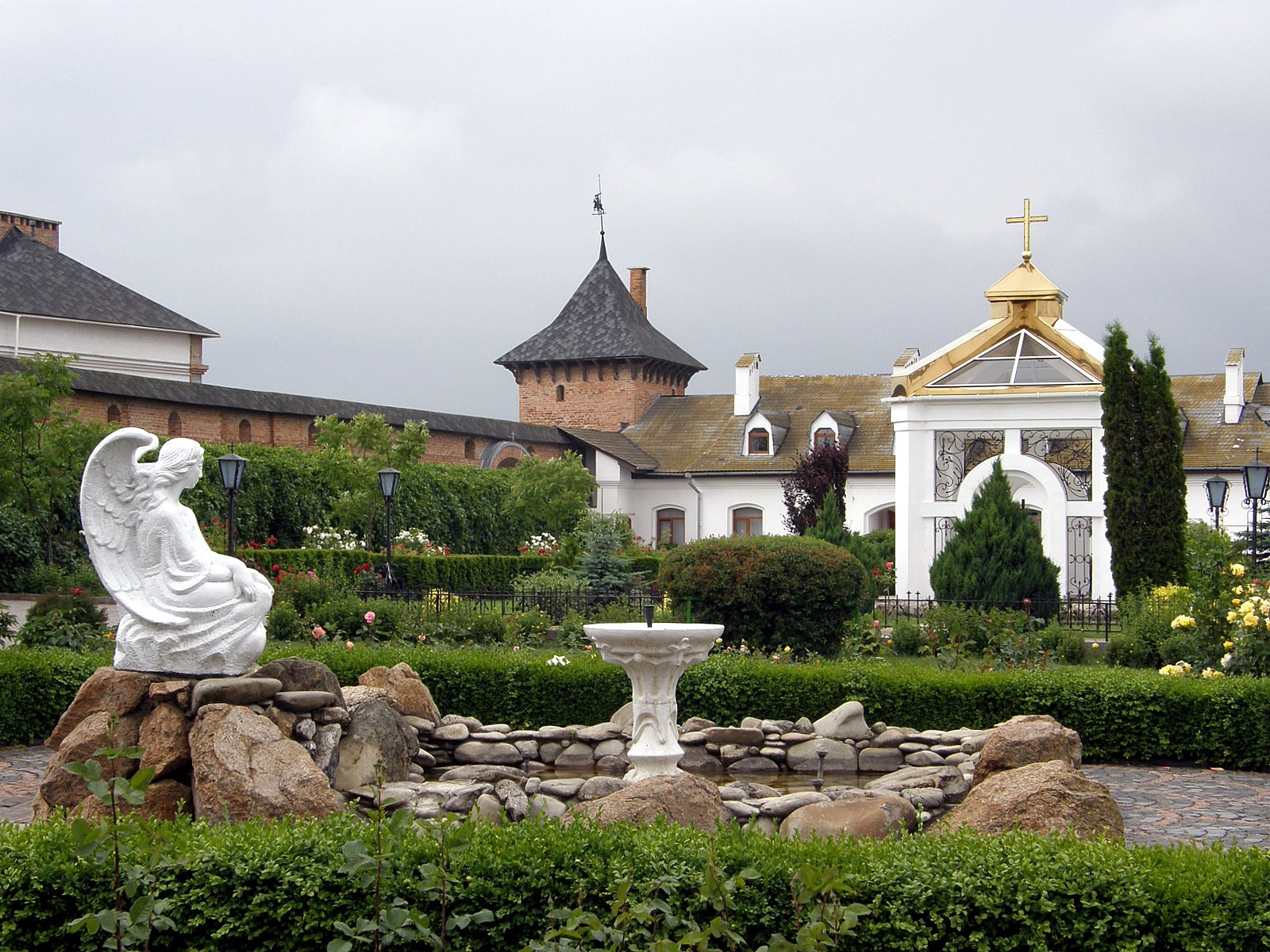
Zymne Monastery

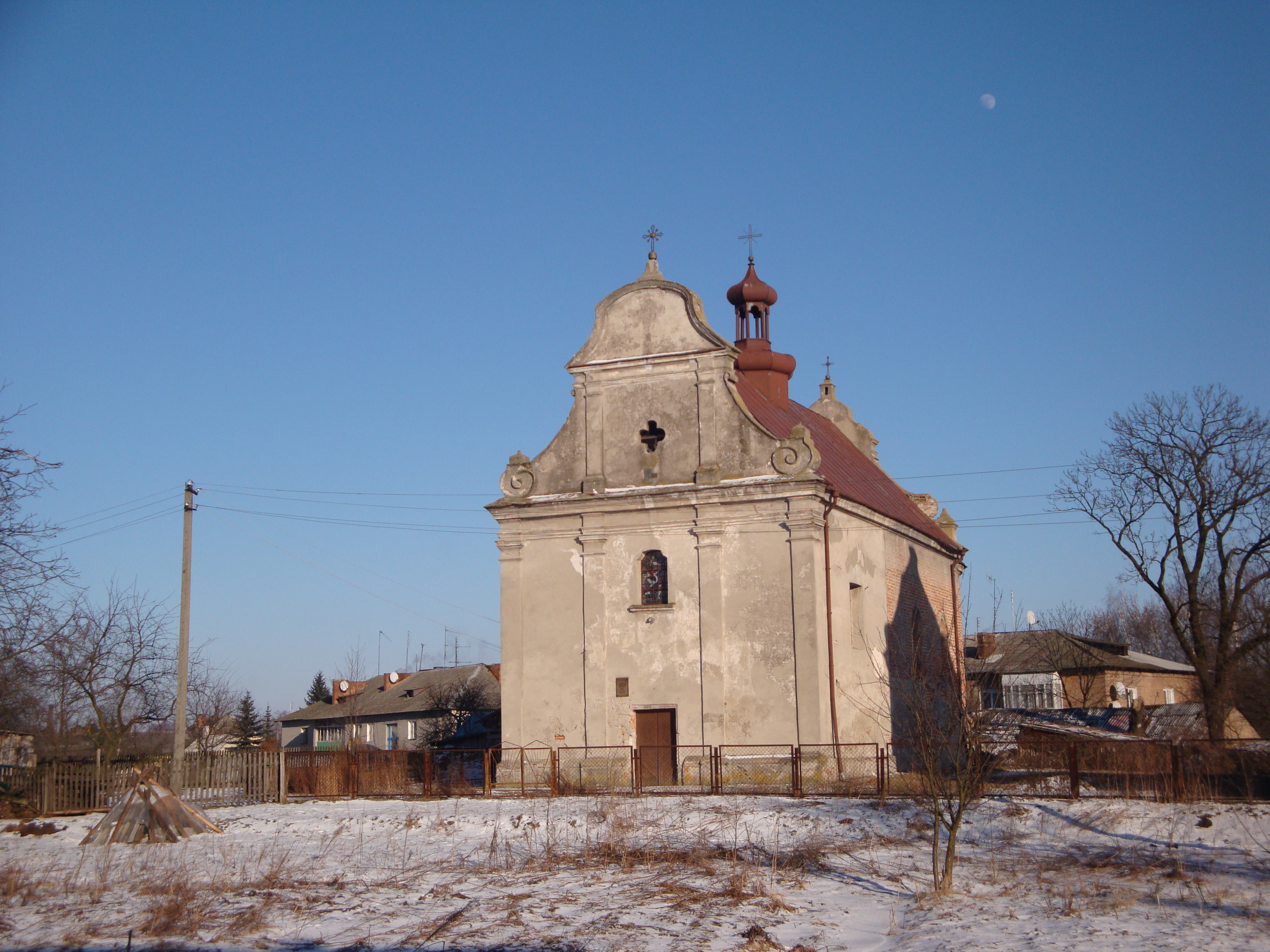
Church of the Holy Trinity in Liuboml

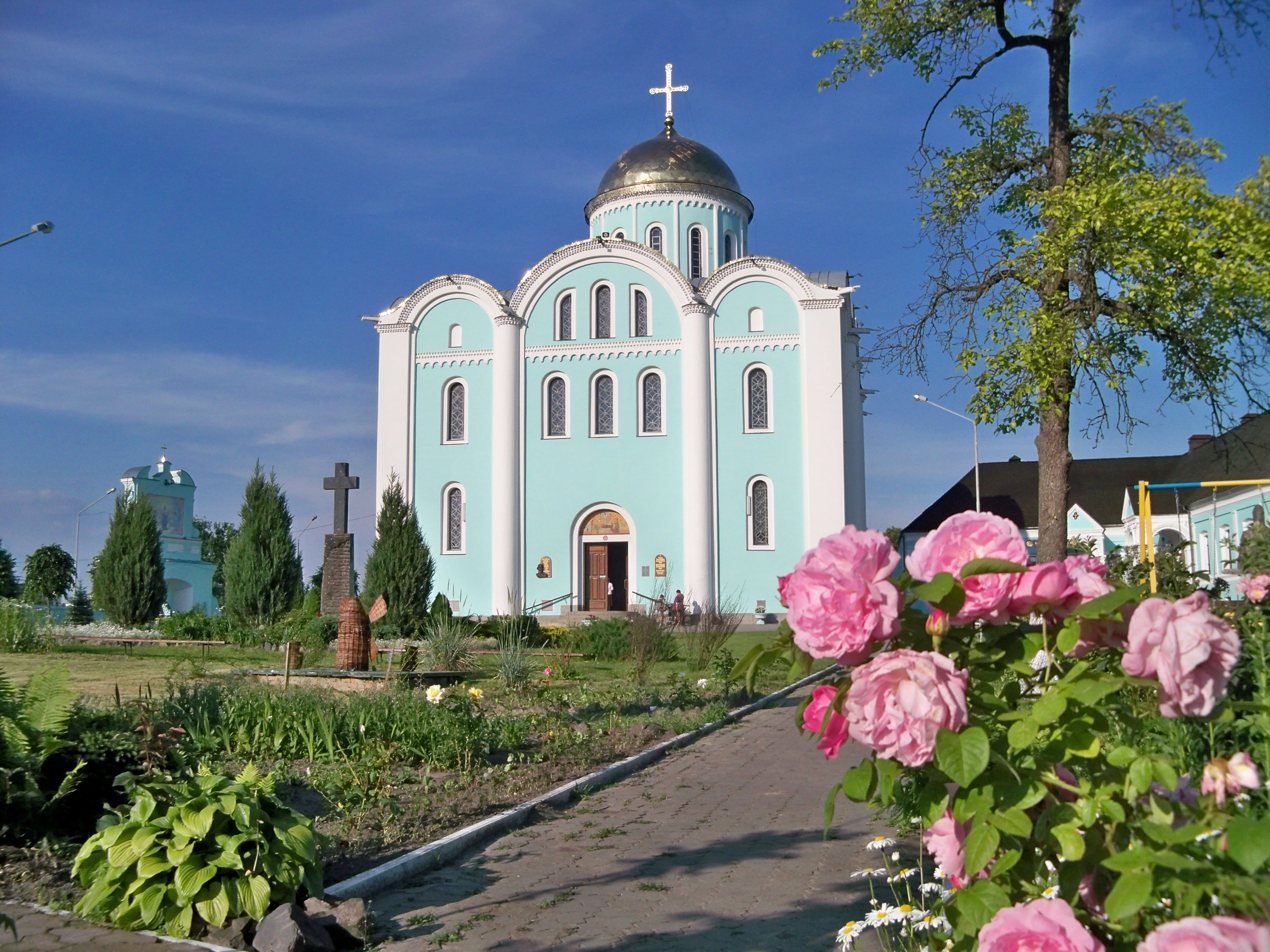
Dormition Monastery in Volodymyr

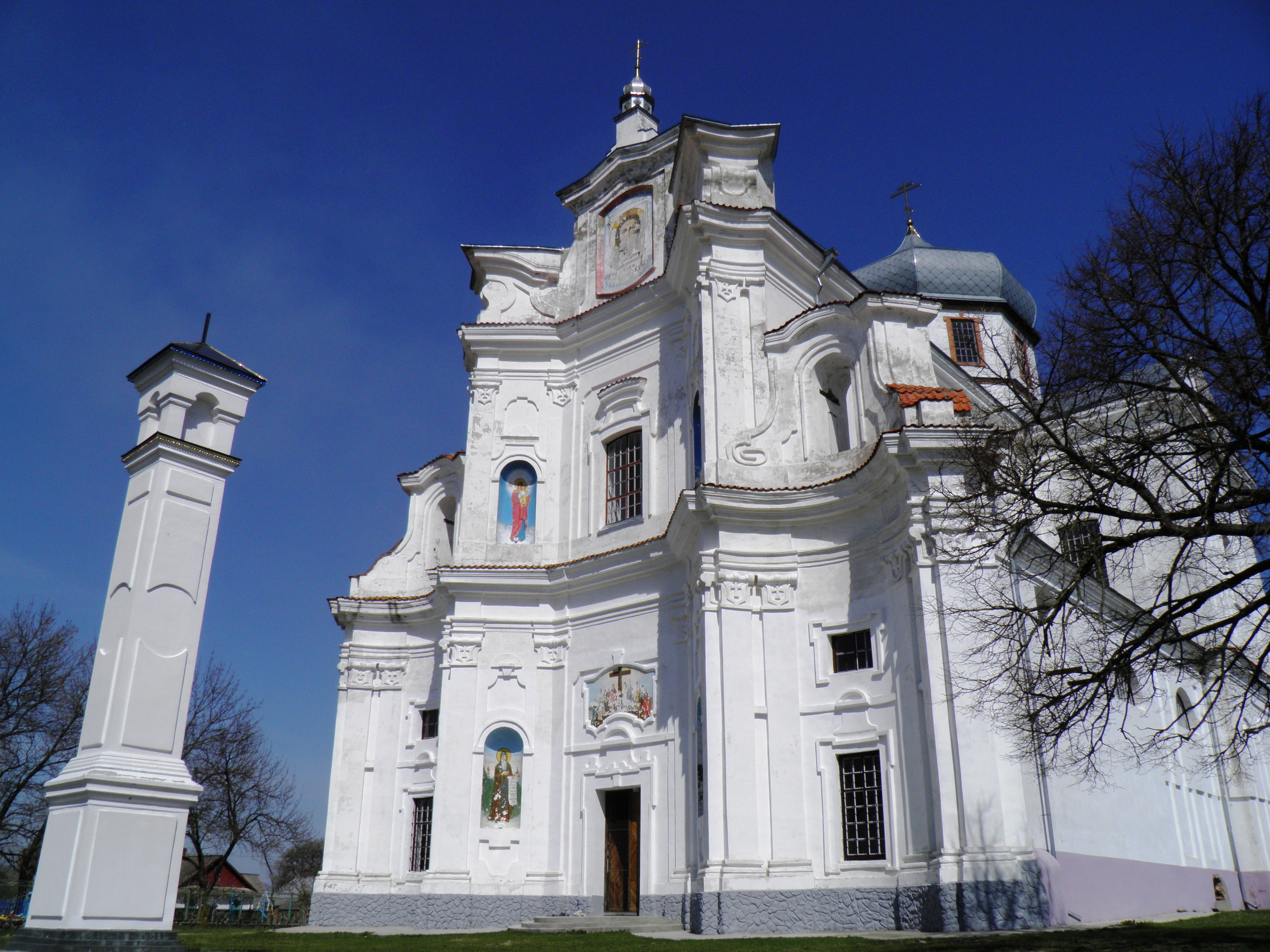
Dominican Church in Staryi Chortoryisk

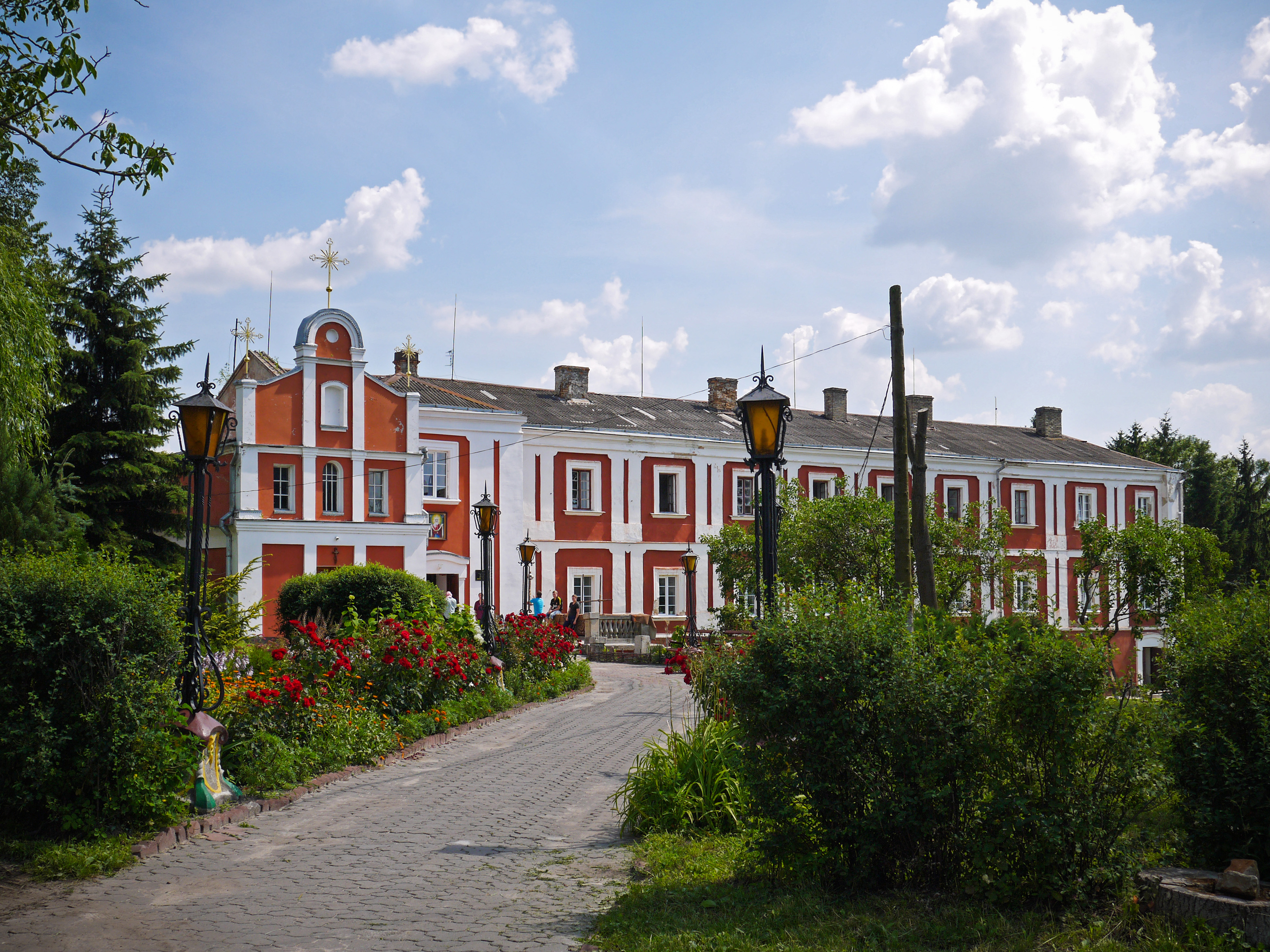
Dominican Monastery in Lutsk

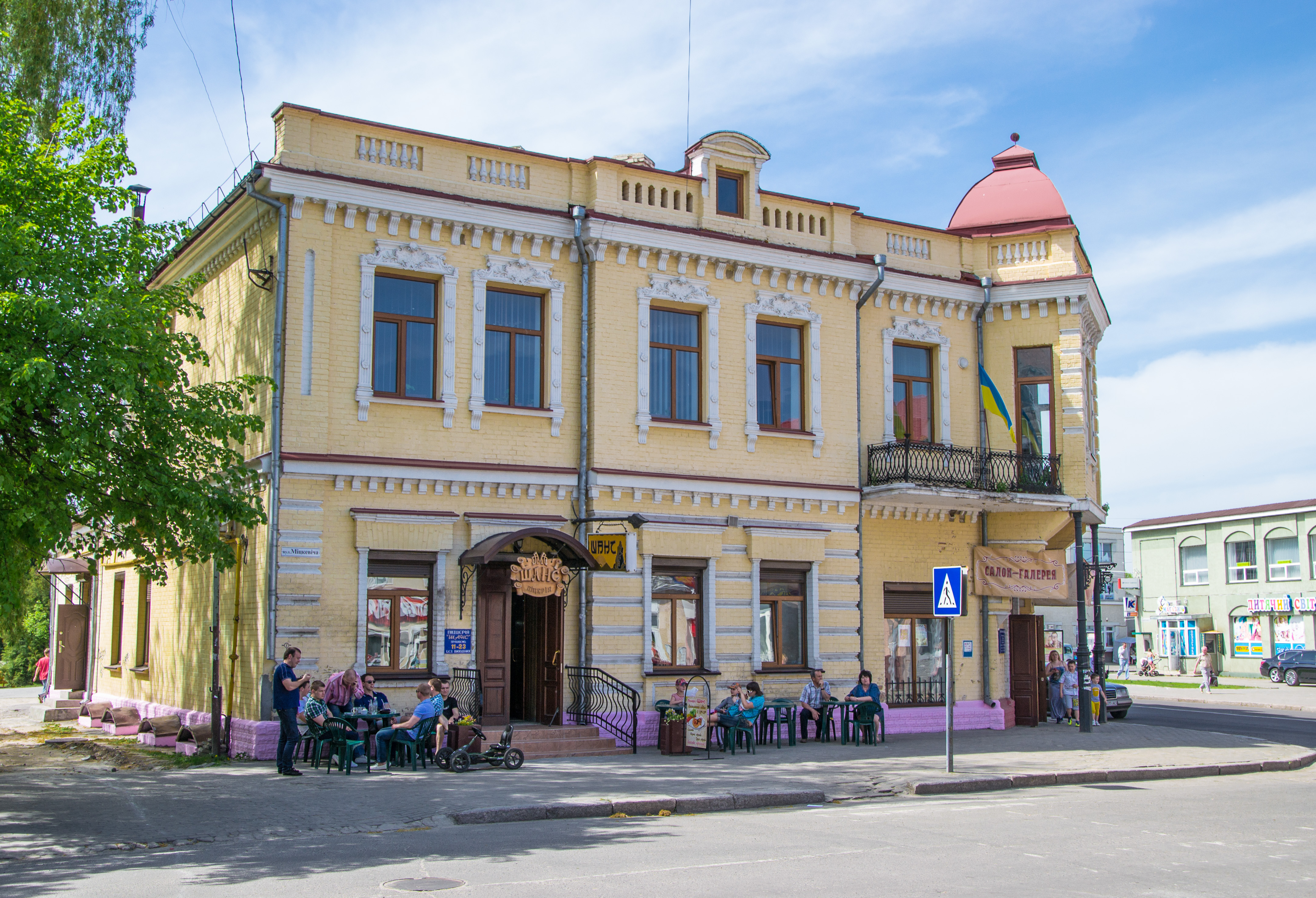
Former pharmacy in Kovel

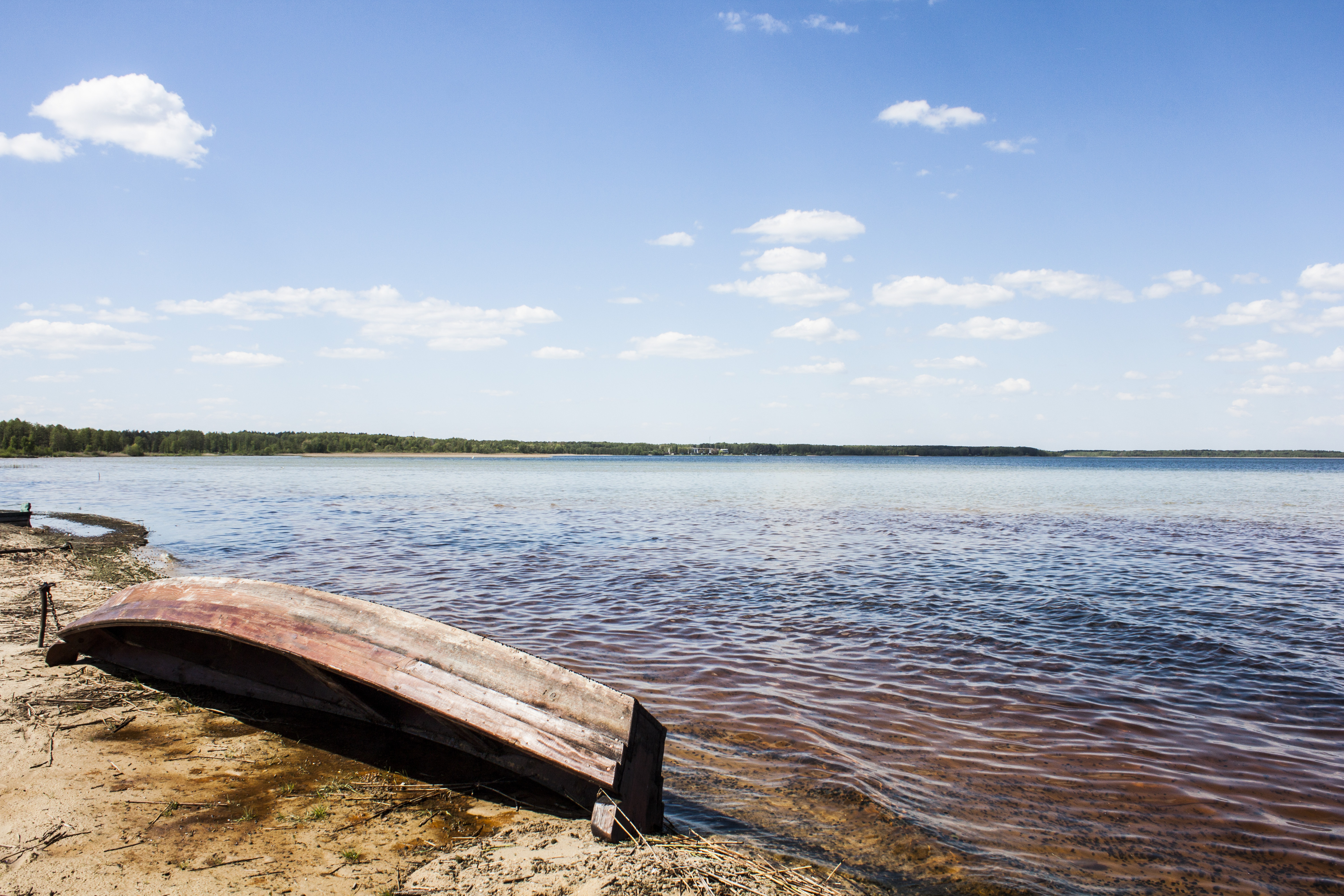
Lake Svitiaz

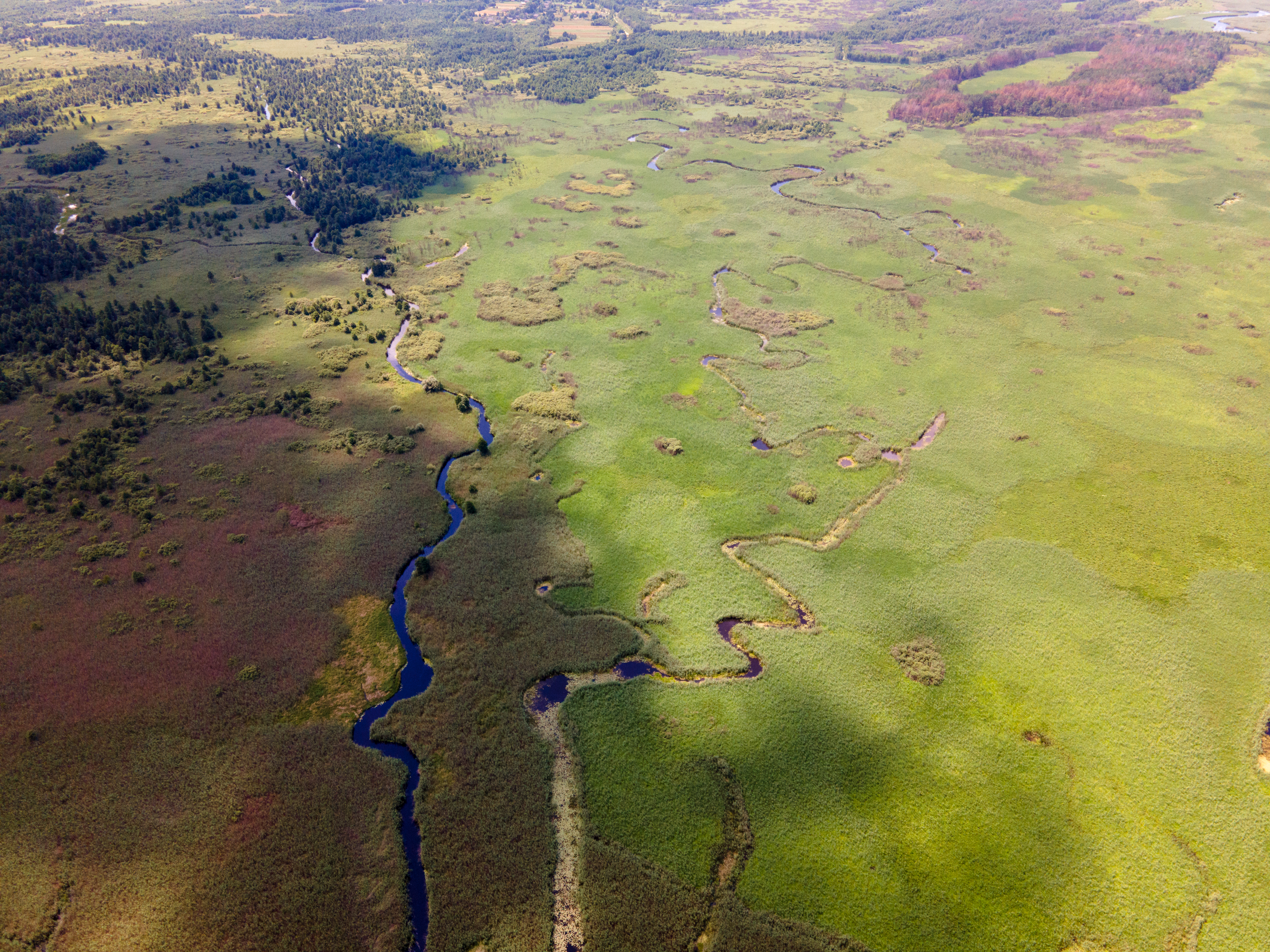
Aerial view of the Stokhid River

== See also ==
- List of villages in Volyn Oblast
