= Ostrozhsky Uyezd =

- Uezd
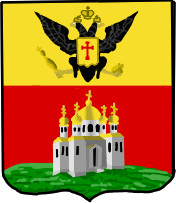
- Coat of arms

- Location in the Volhynian Governorate
- Country: Russian Empire
- Governorate: Poltava
- Established: 1781
- Abolished: 1923
- Capital: Ostroh

Population (1897)
  - Total: 169,351

Ostrozhsky Uyezd (Острожский уезд) was one of the subdivisions of the Volhynian Governorate of the Russian Empire. It was situated in the southern part of the governorate. Its administrative centre was Ostroh.

== Demographics ==
At the time of the Russian Empire Census of 1897, Ostrozhsky Uyezd had a population of 169,351. Of these, 76.7% spoke Ukrainian, 10.8% Yiddish, 6.6% Polish, 2.5% Russian, 1.6% Czech, 1.5% German, 0.1% Tatar and 0.1% Belarusian as their native language.
