= Kremenetsky Uyezd =

- Uezd
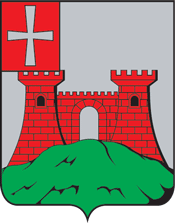
- Coat of arms

- Location in the Volhynian Governorate
- Country: Russian Empire
- Governorate: Poltava
- Established: 1781
- Abolished: 1923
- Capital: Kremenets

Population (1897)
  - Total: 219,934

Kremenetsky Uyezd (Кременецкий уезд; Кременецький повіт) was one of the subdivisions of the Volhynian Governorate of the Russian Empire. It was situated in the southern part of the governorate. Its administrative centre was Kremenets.

== Demographics ==
At the time of the Russian Empire Census of 1897, Kremenetsky Uyezd had a population of 219,934. Of these, 80.7% spoke Ukrainian, 12.2% Yiddish, 3.4% Russian, 3.0% Polish, 0.3% Tatar, 0.1% Czech and 0.1% German as their native language.
