= Dubensky Uyezd =

Subdivision of the Volhynian Governorate, Russian Empire

- Uezd
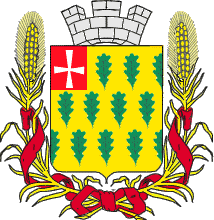
- Coat of arms

- Location in the Volhynian Governorate
- Country: Russian Empire
- Governorate: Poltava
- Established: 1781
- Abolished: 1923
- Capital: Dubno

Population (1897)
  - Total: 195,058

Dubensky Uyezd (Дубенский уезд) was one of the subdivisions of the Volhynian Governorate of the Russian Empire. It was situated in the southwestern part of the governorate. Its administrative centre was Dubno.

== Demographics ==
At the time of the Russian Empire Census of 1897, Dubensky Uyezd had a population of 195,058. Of these, 68.2% spoke Ukrainian, 11.5% Yiddish, 6.5% Polish, 5.3% Czech, 4.2% Russian, 3.6% German, 0.3% Tatar and 0.2% Belarusian as their native language.
