= Volhynia Governorate =

1795–1925 administrative unit

Coordinates: 50.2544°N 28.6578°E

(Zaslav Viceroyalty/Transslavic Viceroyalty) (1793–1795) Volhynia Viceroyalty (1795–1796) Volhynia Governorate (1835–1917)
- Viceroyalty 1793–1796; Governorate 1835–1917
- 1802–1925
- Coat of arms

- Location in the Russian Empire
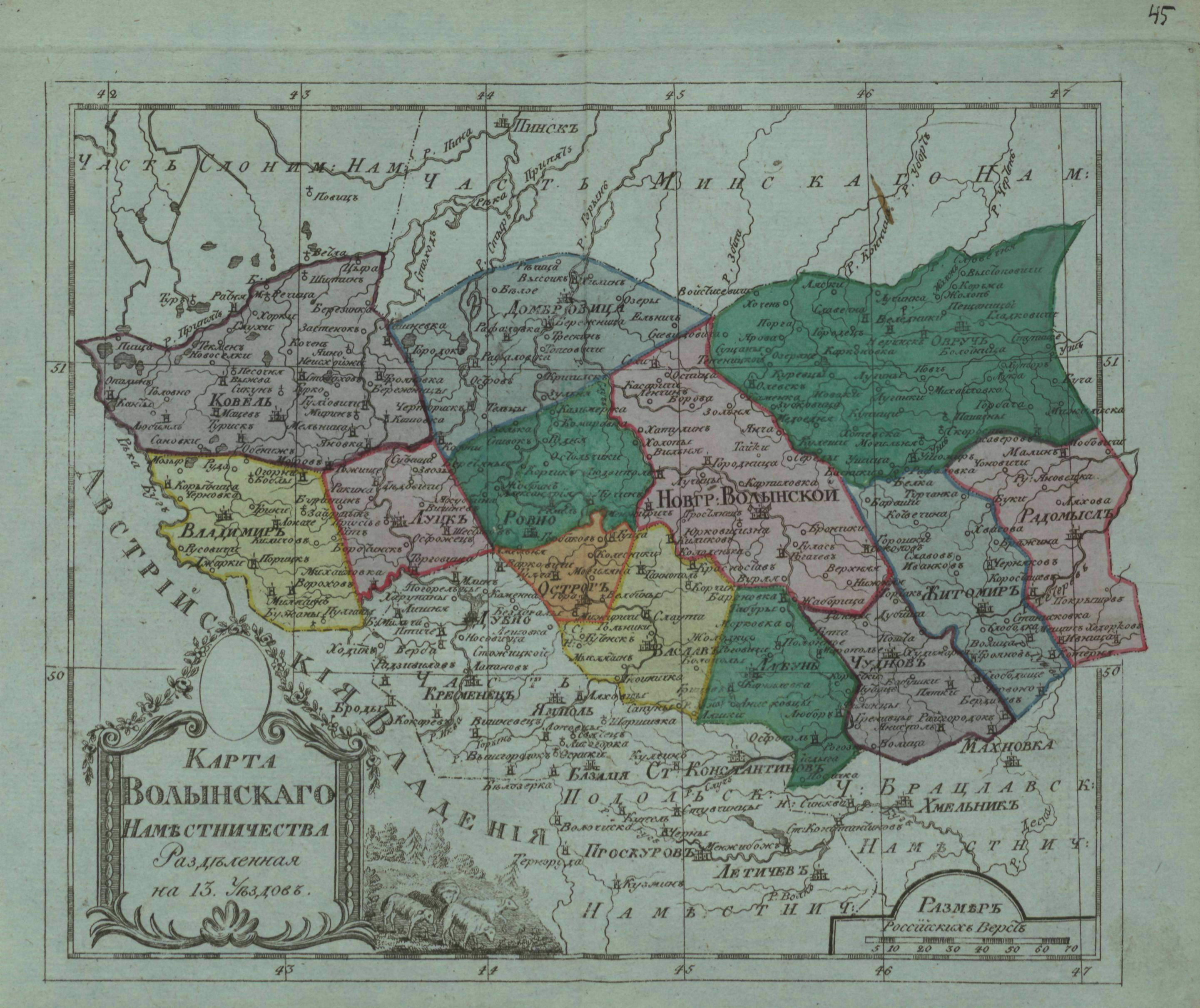
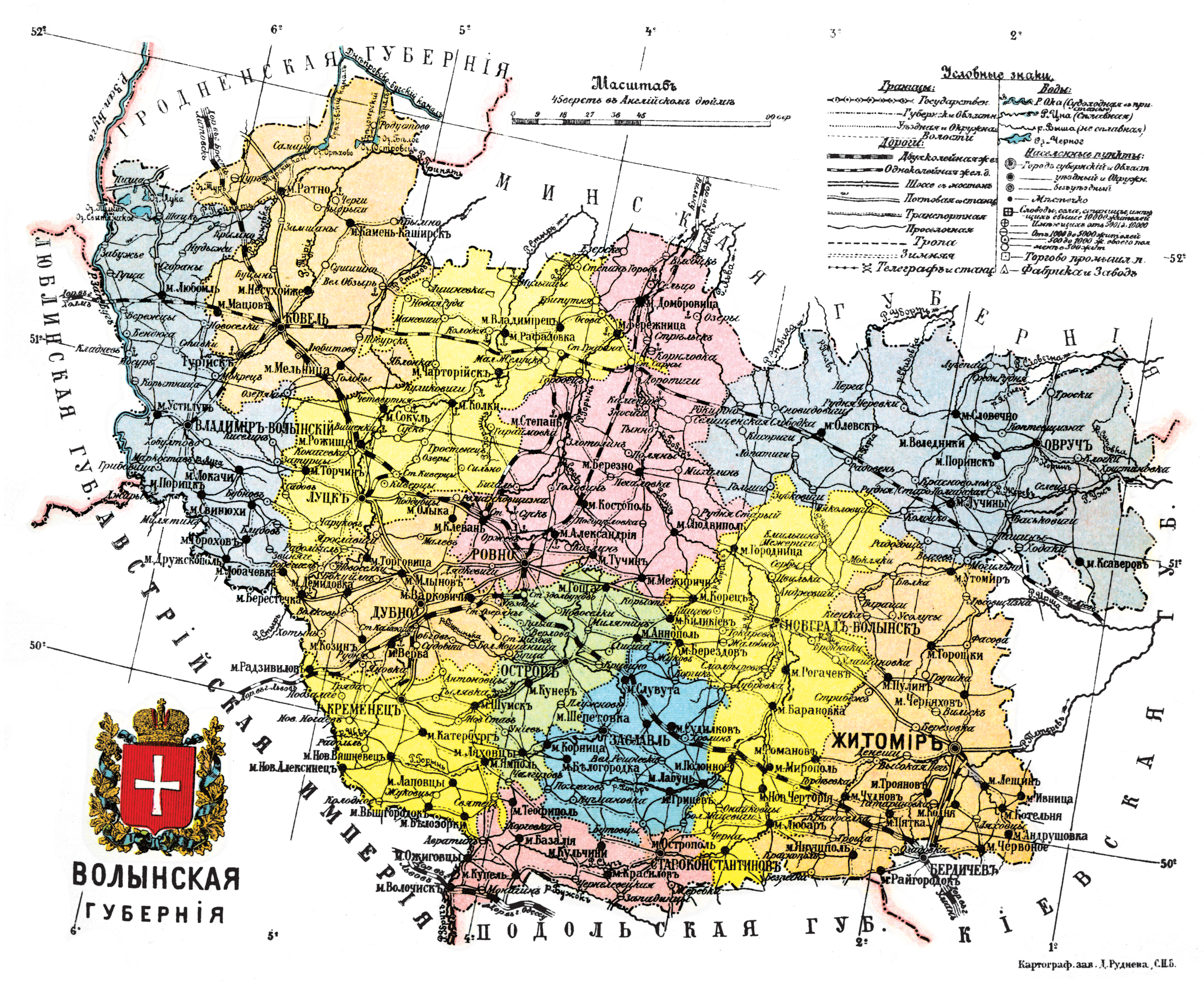
- Capital: Zaslav (1793-1796); Novograd-Volynsky (1796-1804); Zhitomir (1804-1925)
- Area
  - (1897): 71,736 km^{2} (27,697 sq mi)
- Population
  - (1897): 2,989,482
- History
  - Established: 1802
  - Abolished: 1925
Preceded by
Kyiv Voivodeship
Volhynian Voivodeship
Ruthenian Voivodeship
Succeeded by
Wołyń Voivodeship
Volyn Okruha
Shepetivka Okruha
Korosten Okruha
Berdychiv Okruha
Kiev Governorate

Volhynia Governorate, also known as Volyn Governorate, (Note: Russian: Волы́нская губе́рния, pre-1918: Волы́нская губе́рнія, romanized: Volýnskaya gubérniya; Ukrainian: Воли́нська губе́рнія, romanized: Volýnsʼka hubérniia) was an administrative-territorial unit (guberniya) of the Southwestern Krai of the Russian Empire, established in the historical region of Volhynia. It consisted of an area of 71,736 square kilometres (27,697 mi^{2}) and a population of 2,989,482 inhabitants. The governorate bordered Grodno and Minsk Governorates to the north, Kiev Governorate to the east, Podolia Governorate to the south, Lublin and Siedlce Governorates, and after 1912, Kholm Governorate and Austria to the west. Its capital was in Novograd-Volynsky until 1804, and then Zhitomir. It corresponded to most of modern-day Volyn, Rivne and Zhytomyr Oblasts of Ukraine and some parts of Brest and Gomel Regions of Belarus.

It was created at the end of 1796 after the Third Partition of Poland from the territory of the short-lived Volhynian Vice-royalty and Wołyń Voivodeship. After the Peace of Riga, part of the governorate became the new Wołyń Voivodeship in the Second Polish Republic, while the other part stayed as a part of the Ukrainian SSR until 1925 when it was abolished on resolution of the All-Ukrainian Central Executive Committee and Counsel of People's Commissars.

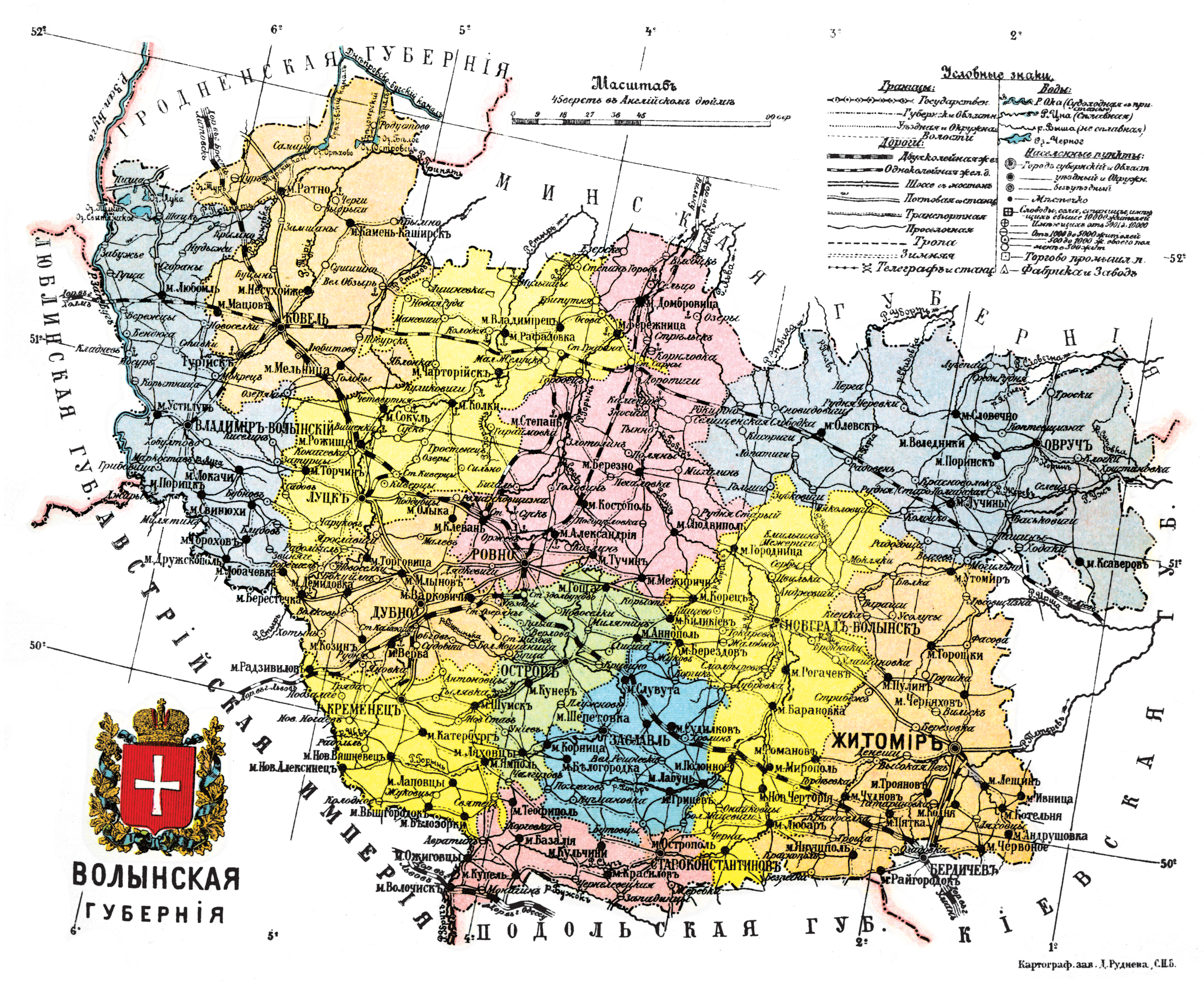
Volyn Governorate map in 1913

== History ==
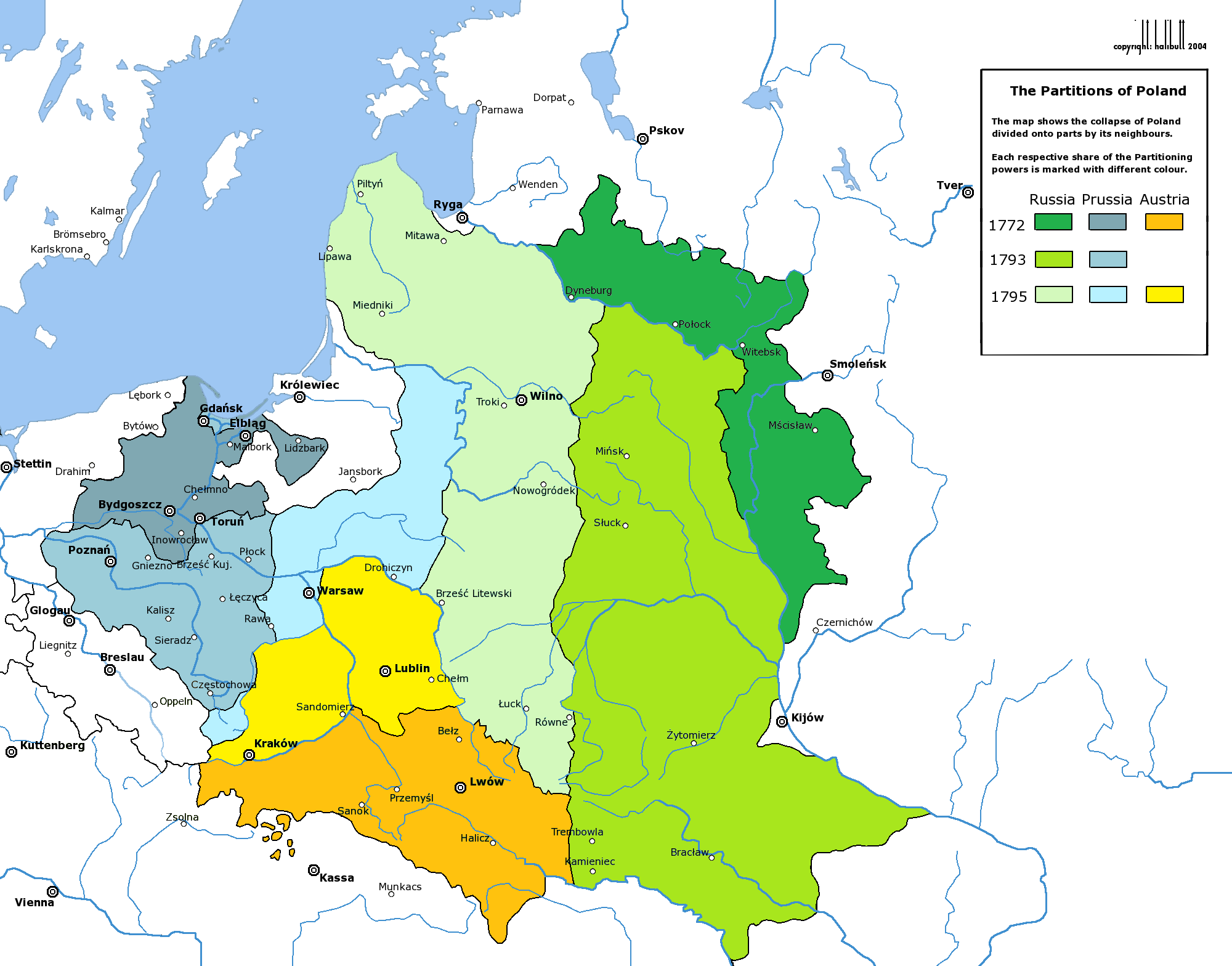
Three partitions of Polish-Lithuanian Commonwealth

Until 1796, the guberniya was administered as a Viceroyalty (namestnichestvo). It was initially centred in Zaslav and was called the Zaslav Viceroyalty. It was primarily created from the Kyiv Voivodeship and in 1795 Volhynian Voivodeship whit boder lands of Ruthenian Voivodeship.

On 24 October 1795, the Third Partition of Poland was imposed by Prussia, the Habsburg monarchy, and the Russian Empire.

Then, on 12 December 1796, Volhynia Governorate was established, encompassing the remaining territory of the Wolyn Voivodeship and the Kyiv Voivodeship.

In 1796, the administration moved to Novograd-Volynsky. However, due to the lack of suitable buildings for administrative purposes, the capital was moved once again to Zhitomir (Zhytomyr).

In 1802, Zhitomir was purchased the properties of Prince Ilyinsky, and in 1804, it officially became the seat of Volhynia Governorate.

From 1832 to 1915, Volhynia Governorate, along with Kiev Governorate and Podolia Governorate, formed part of the Southwestern Krai General-Governorate–a militarized administrative-territorial unit.

In the 1880s, the general-governorate was extended to include other governorates.

In 1897, the population of the guberniya was 2,989,482 and by 1905, it had grown to 3,920,400. The majority of the population in the governorate spoke the Ukrainian language with slight variety of dialects.

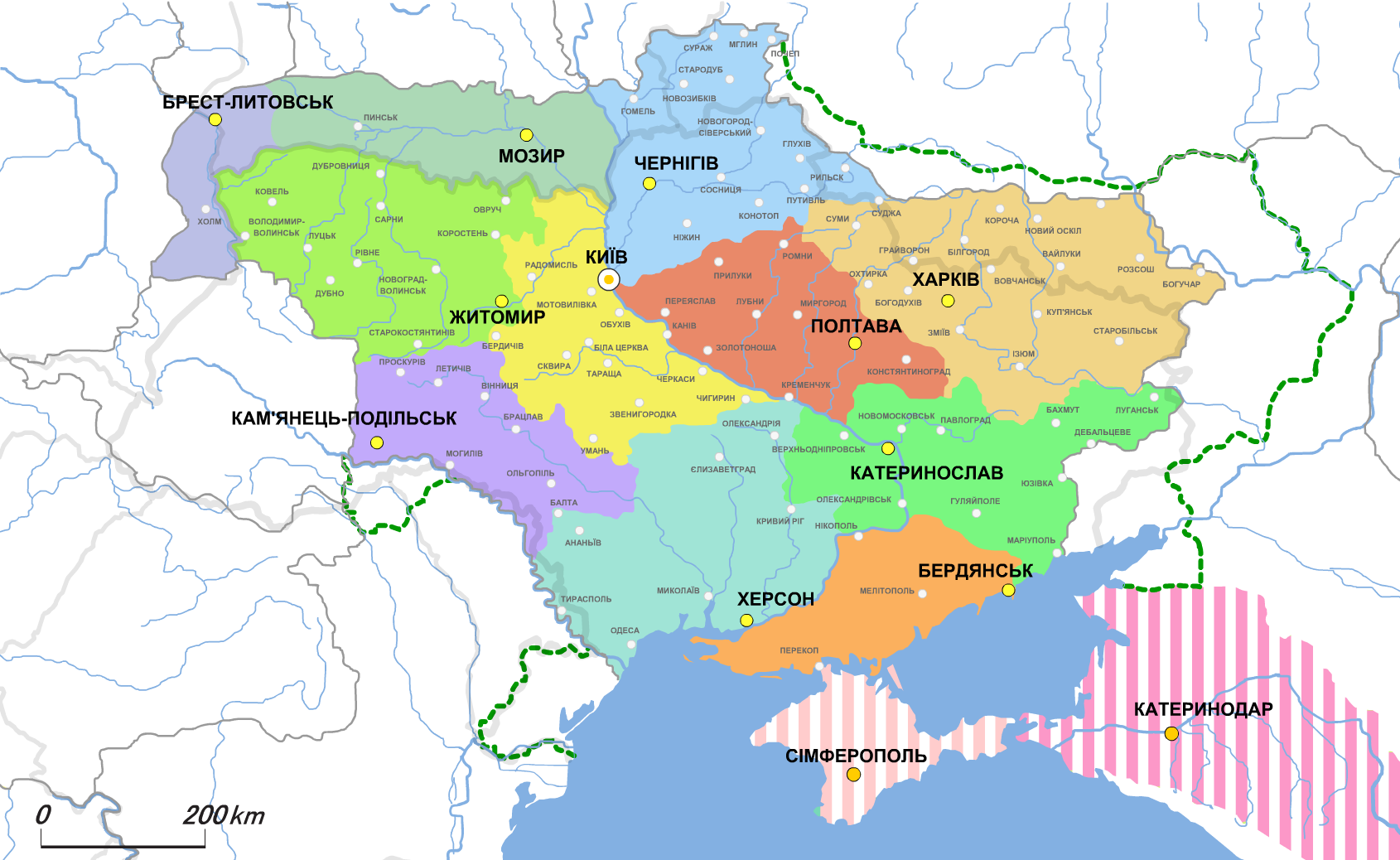
Volhynia Governorate (green) in the Ukrainian State

Under the Russian Provisional Government administrative power in the governorates was transferred to commissars, who preserved their positions after the proclamation of Ukrainian People's Republic in November 1917. Their power was mostly nominal due to the growth of Bolshevik Soviet influence, especially in industrial areas. During that time Andrii Vyazlov served as the gubernial commissar of Volhynia.

During the Ukrainian–Soviet War Zhitomir served as the provisional capital of Ukraine in 1918.

After the return of Central Rada in March 1918 new commissars were appointed along with military commandants. After the establishment of the Hetmanate, in May 1918 those were replaced with Governorate starosts.

After the Polish-Soviet war in 1920, and according to the Peace of Riga (1921) most of the territory became part of the Second Polish Republic and transformed into the Wołyń Voivodeship, with the capital in Łuck (Lutsk). The eastern portion existed until 1925 and was later split into three okruhas: Shepetivka Okruha, Zhytomyr Okruha, and Korosten Okruha.

=== Heads of Guberniya ===
Revkom

- 1919 Mikhail Kruchinskiy (concurrently the head of Volyn Cheka)

Volyn Executive Committee

- 1920 Oleksandr Shumsky
- 1920 Vasiliy Averin
- – 1921 Danylevych
- 1921–1922 Ivan Nikolayenko

=== Head of Security Services ===
Cheka

- 1919 Vasyl Viliavko
- 1919 M.Shuf
- 1919 Mikhail Kruchinskiy
- November 1919 – December 1919 Vsevolod Balytsky
- December 1919 Vasyl Levotsky (acting)
- – 2 November 1921 Semen Kesselman (Zapadny)
- January 1922 – 2 June 1922 Janis Biksons

GPU

- -1923 Pavel Ivonin
- March 1923 – October 1923 Foma Leoniuk
- 1 July 1923 – 1 September 1924 Symon Dukelsky
- 1924 – 1925 Aleksandr Safes (Grozny)

== Principal cities ==
Russian Census of 1897

- Zhytomir – 65 895 (Jewish – 30 572, Russian – 16 944, Ukrainian – 9 152)
- Rovno – 24 573 (Jewish – 13 704, Russian – 4 278, Ukrainian – 4 071)
- Kremenets – 17 704 (Ukrainian – 8 322, Jewish – 6 476, Russian – 1 863)
- Kovel – 17 697 (Jewish – 8 502, Russian – 4 828, Ukrainian – 2 093)
- Novograd-Volynsky – 16 904 (Jewish – 9 363, Russian – 2 939, Ukrainian – 2 662)
- Starokonstantinov – 16 377 (Jewish – 9 164, Ukrainian – 4 886, Russian – 1 402)
- Lutsk – 15 804 (Jewish – 9 396, Russian – 2 830, Ukrainian – 1 478)
- Ostrog – 14 749 (Jewish – 9 185, Ukrainian – 2 446, Russian – 2 199)
- Dubno – 14 257 (Jewish – 7 096, Russian – 2 962, Ukrainian – 2 474)
- Zaslavl – 12 611 (Jewish – 5 991, Ukrainian – 3 990, Russian – 1 722)

=== Administrative division ===
County		Capital	Arms of capital	Area	Population (1897 census)
Transliteration name	Russian Cyrillic	Capital	Arms of capital	Area	Population (1897 census)
Vladimir-Volynsky	Владиміро-Волынскій	Vladimir-Volynsky		6,482.1 km^{2} (2,502.8 sq mi)	198,688
Dubensky	Дубенскій	Dubno		3,963.8 km^{2} (1,530.4 sq mi)	158,734
Zhitomirsky	Житомірскій	Zhitomir		7,670.5 km^{2} (2,961.6 sq mi)	281,387
Zaslavsky	Заславскій	Zaslavl		3,476.7 km^{2} (1,342.4 sq mi)	93,381
Kovelsky	Ковельскій	Kovel		7,656.8 km^{2} (2,956.3 sq mi)	121,326
Kremenetsky	Кременецкій	Kremenets		3,460.8 km^{2} (1,336.2 sq mi)	196,751
Lutsky	Луцкій	Lutsk		7,540.8 km^{2} (2,911.5 sq mi)	203,761
Novograd-Volynsky	Новоградъ-Волынскій	Novograd-Volynsky		7,205 km^{2} (2,782 sq mi)	273,123
Ovruchsky	Овручскій	Ovruch		10,616.9 km^{2} (4,099.2 sq mi)	194,796
Ostrozhsky	Острожскій	Ostrog		3,065.9 km^{2} (1,183.8 sq mi)	166,882
Rovensky	Ровенскій	Rovno		8,568.4 km^{2} (3,308.3 sq mi)	275,119
Starokonstantinovsky	Староконстантиновскій	Starokostiantinov		2,560.4 km^{2} (988.6 sq mi)	211,768

== Demographics ==
=== Language ===
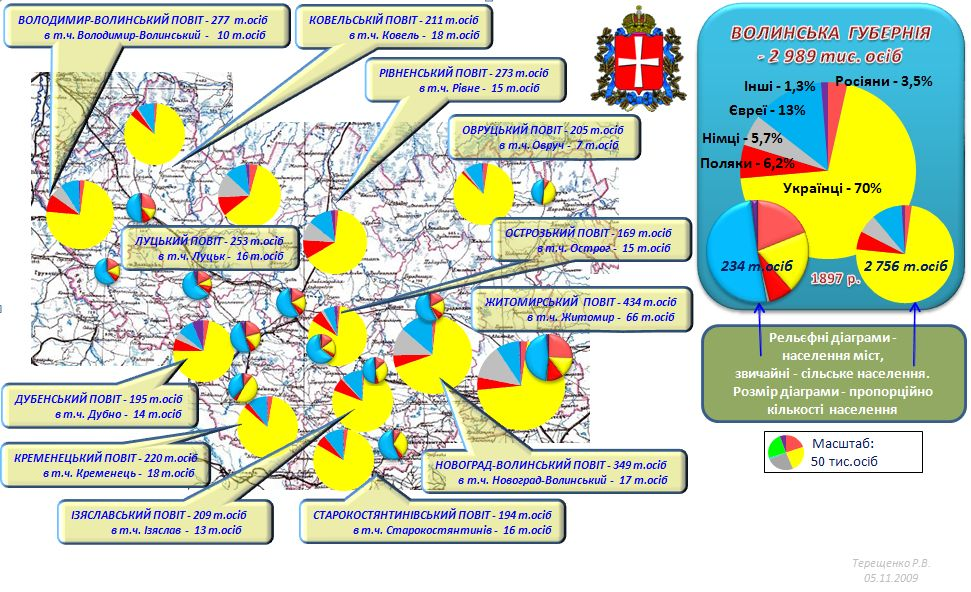
Imperial census of 1897.

According to the Russian Empire Census on 28 January [O.S. 1897] 15 January, the Volhynian Governorate had a population of 2,982,482, including 1,502,803 men and 1,486,679 women. The majority of the population indicated Ukrainian (Note: Prior to 1918, the Imperial Russian government classified Russians as the Great Russians, Ukrainians as the Little Russians, and Belarusians as the White Russians. Also, the Belarusian Democratic Republic which the White Russians identified themselves as "Belarusian".) to be their mother tongue, with significant Jewish, Polish, German, and Russian speaking minorities.

Linguistic composition of the Volhynian Governorate in 1897
Language	Native speakers	Percentage
Ukrainian	2,095,537	70.26
Jewish	394,774	13.24
Polish	184,161	6.17
German	171,331	5.74
Russian	104,889	3.52
Czech	27,670	0.93
Tatar	3,817	0.13
Belarusian	3,794	0.13
Bashkir	983	0.03
Mordovian	375	0.01
Romanian	314	0.01
Chuvash	308	0.01
Gypsi	286	0.01
French	154	0.00
Cheremis	143	0.00
Latvian	113	0.00
Lithuanian	103	0.00
Votyak	102	0.00
Not-specified	97	0.00
Others	531	0.01
Total	2,982,482	100.00

=== Religion ===
- By the Imperial census of 1897. In **bold** are religions with more members than the Eastern Orthodox.

Religion	Number	percentage (%)	males	females
Eastern Orthodox	2,106,521	70.46		
Judaism	395,782	13.24		
Roman Catholics	298,110	9.97		
Lutherans	163,990	5.49		
Baptists	10 375	0.35		
Other (Old Believers, Magometians)	14 704	0.49		
