= Lutsky Uyezd =

- Uezd
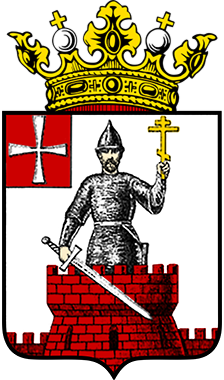
- Coat of arms

- Location in the Volhynian Governorate
- Country: Russian Empire
- Governorate: Poltava
- Established: 1781
- Abolished: 1923
- Capital: Lutsk

Population (1897)
  - Total: 252,550

Lutsky Uyezd (Луцкий уезд) was one of the subdivisions of the Volhynian Governorate of the Russian Empire. It was situated in the northwestern part of the governorate. Its administrative centre was Lutsk.

== Demographics ==
At the time of the Russian Empire Census of 1897, Lutsky Uyezd had a population of 252,550. Of these, 57.0% spoke Ukrainian, 14.1% Yiddish, 12.0% German, 9.7% Polish, 5.1% Russian, 1.5% Czech, 0.4% Tatar and 0.1% Belarusian as their native language.
