= Zhitomirsky Uyezd =

Administrative district of the Russian Empire

Zhitomirsky Uyezd Житомирский уезд
- Uezd
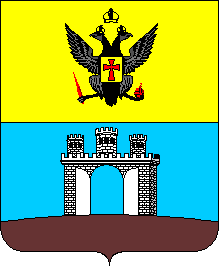
- Coat of arms

- Location in the Volhynian Governorate
- Country: Russian Empire
- Governorate: Volhynian Governorate
- Capital: Zhytomyr

Population (1897)
  - Total: 433,859

Zhitomirsky Uyezd (Житомирский уезд) was one of the subdivisions of the Volhynian Governorate of the Russian Empire. It was situated in the southeastern part of the governorate. Its administrative centre was Zhytomyr.

== Demographics ==
At the time of the Russian Empire Census of 1897, Zhitomirsky Uyezd had a population of 433,859. Of these, 62.4% spoke Ukrainian, 14.3% Yiddish, 10.8% German, 5.9% Russian, 5.7% Polish, 0.6% Czech, 0.1% Bashkir and 0.1% Tatar as their native language.
