= Rovensky Uyezd =

- Uezd
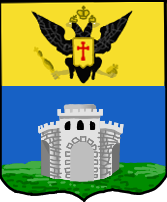
- Coat of arms

- Location in the Volhynian Governorate
- Country: Russian Empire
- Governorate: Poltava
- Established: 1781
- Abolished: 1923
- Capital: Rovno

Population (1897)
  - Total: 273,001

Rovensky Uyezd (Ровенский уезд) was one of the subdivisions of the Volhynian Governorate of the Russian Empire. It was situated in the northern part of the governorate. Its administrative centre was Rivne.

== Demographics ==
At the time of the Russian Empire Census of 1897, Rovensky Uyezd had a population of 273,001. Of these, 60.5% spoke Ukrainian, 16.0% Yiddish, 9.2% Polish, 8.9% German, 3.2% Russian, 1.7% Czech, 0.3% Belarusian and 0.1% Tatar as their native language.
