= Novograd-Volynsky Uyezd =

- Uezd
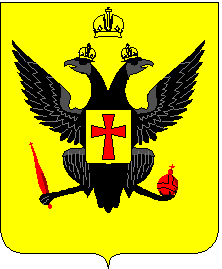
- Coat of arms

- Location in the Volhynian Governorate
- Country: Russian Empire
- Governorate: Poltava
- Established: 1781
- Abolished: 1923
- Capital: Novohrad-Volynskyi

Population (1897)
  - Total: 348,950

Novograd-Volynsky Uyezd (Russian: Новоград-Волынский уезд; Ukrainian: Новоград-Волинський повіт, romanized: Novohrad-Volyns'kyi povit) was one of the subdivisions of the Volhynian Governorate of the Russian Empire. It was situated in the southeastern part of the governorate. Its administrative centre was Novohrad-Volynskyi (now Zviahel).

== Demographics ==
At the time of the Russian Empire Census of 1897, Novograd-Volynsky Uyezd had a population of 348,950. Of these, 65.5% spoke Ukrainian, 15.6% Yiddish, 10.9% German, 5.2% Polish, 2.4% Russian, 0.1% Czech and 0.1% Bashkir as their native language.
