= Kovelsky Uyezd =

Former subdivision of the Russian Empire

- Uezd
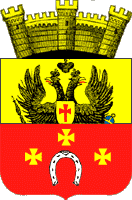
- Coat of arms

- Location in the Volhynian Governorate
- Country: Russian Empire
- Governorate: Poltava
- Established: 1781
- Abolished: 1923
- Capital: Kovel

Population (1897)
  - Total: 211,493

Kovelsky Uyezd (Ковельский уезд) was one of the subdivisions of the Volhynian Governorate of the Russian Empire. It was situated in the northwestern part of the governorate. Its administrative centre was Kovel.

== Demographics ==
At the time of the Russian Empire Census of 1897, Kovelsky Uyezd had a population of 211,493. Of these, 78.5% spoke Ukrainian, 11.9% Yiddish, 4.6% Polish, 3.5% Russian, 0.9% German, 0.3% Belarusian, 0.1% Tatar and 0.1% Moldovan or Romanian as their native language.
