= Coat of arms of Volyn Oblast =

Coat of arms of Volyn Oblast

The coat of arms of the Volyn Oblast in Ukraine shows a silver cross in the red field of the shield. The coat of arms was adopted in 1997.

The cross as a symbol of Volhynia has appeared on the seals of the Grand Dukes of Lithuania since the 15th century. After the annexation of Volhynia to Crown Lands of Poland, the cross supplemented with an eagle placed on the shield at the crossing of the cross arms was the coat of arms of the Volhynian Voivodeship.

The coat of arms of the Volhynian Voivodeship in the Polish-Lithuanian Commonwealth

The coat of arms of the Volhynian Governorate in the Russian Empire

Coat of arms of the Wołyń Voivodeship of the Second Republic of Poland
