= Bratslav Viceroyalty =

Viceroyalty within the Russian Empire

Bratslav Viceroyalty Брацлавское наместничество (Bratslavskoye namestnichestvo)
- Viceroyalty of the Russian Empire
- 1793–1796
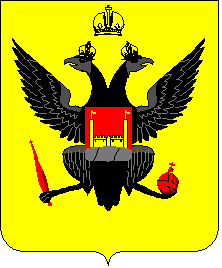
- Coat of arms

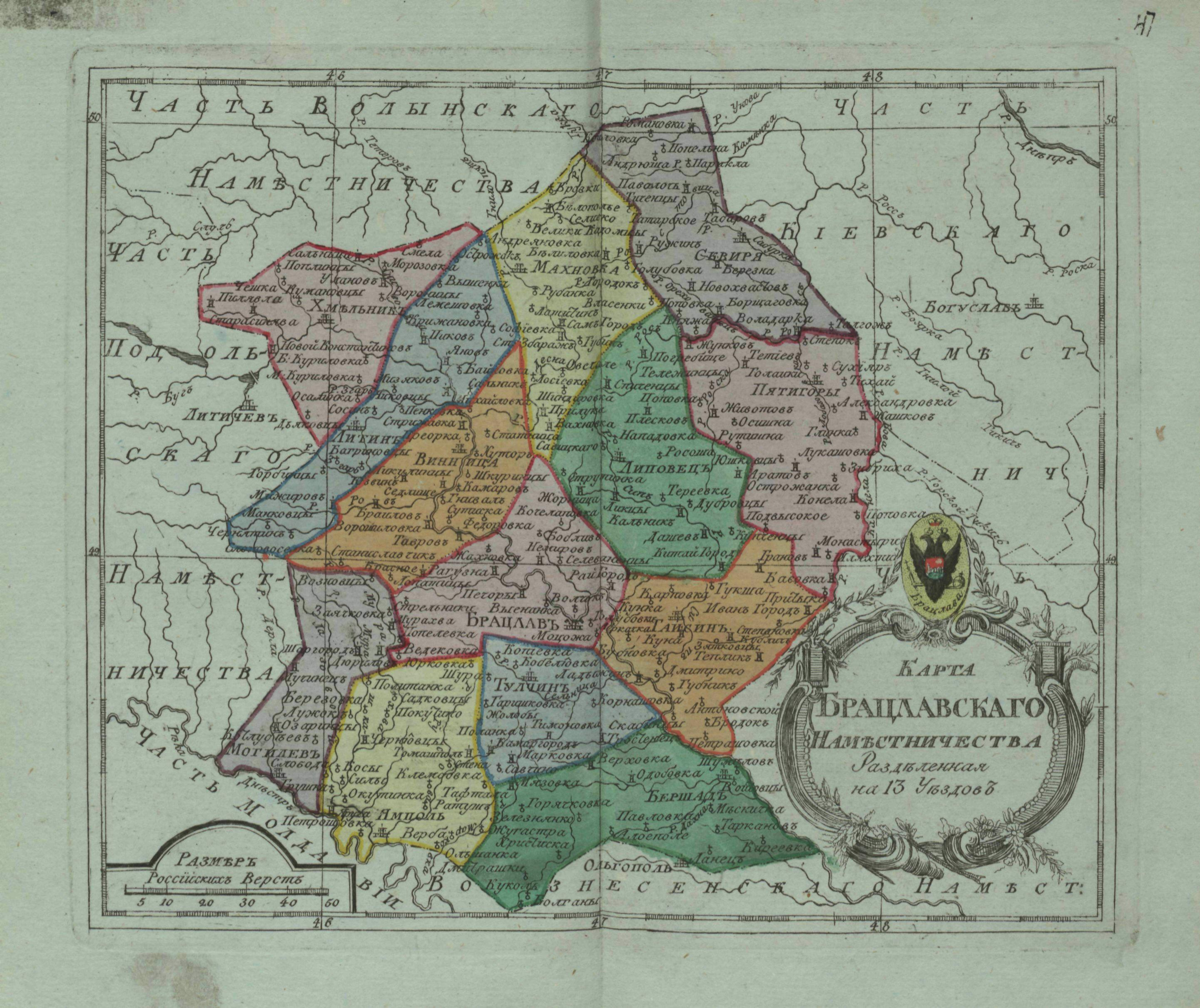
- Bratslav Viceroyalty, 1796
- Capital: Bratslav
- History
  - Second Partition of the Polish-Lithuanian Commonwealth: 24 April [O.S. 13 April] 1793
  - Abolished: 23 December [O.S. 12 December] 1796
- Political subdivisions: Viceroyalties of the Russian Empire
Preceded by	Succeeded by
Podolian Voivodeship; Bracław Voivodeship	Podolian Governorate; Kiev Governorate

The Bratslav Viceroyalty (Russian: Брацлавское наместничество) was a viceroyalty within the Russian Empire that existed between 1793 and 1796.

== History ==
The territory of the Bratslav Viceroyalty was previously part of the Bracław and Podolian Voivodeships of the Polish-Lithuanian Commonwealth. The Bracław Voivodeship was created in 1566 as part of the Grand Duchy of Lithuania, and was passed to the Crown of Poland in 1569. After the Second Partition of Poland in 1793, the voivodeship was incorporated into the Russian Empire and was replaced by the Bratslav Governate on 24 April [O.S. 13 April] 1793. By Imperial decree it was designated the Bratslav Viceroyalty on 22 May [O.S. 11 May] 1795, consisting of thirteen districts, or uyezds, with the city of Bratslav as its initial administrative centre, though this was transferred to Vinnytsia in 1795. On 23 December [O.S. 12 December] 1796, shortly after his ascension to the throne, Emperor Paul I ordered the liquidation of the viceroyalty as part of wider administrative reforms. The territory was divided between the Podolian Governorate, which received nine uyezds; Bratslavsky, Vinnitsky, Litinsky, Bershadsky, Gaysinsky, Yampolsky, Mogilyovsky, Tulchinsky and Khmelnitsky; and Kiev Governorate receiving four; Makhnovsky, Skvirsky, Lipovetsky and Pyatigorsky.
