= Letichev uezd =

Letichev uezd Летичевскій уѣздъ
- Uezd
- Coat of arms

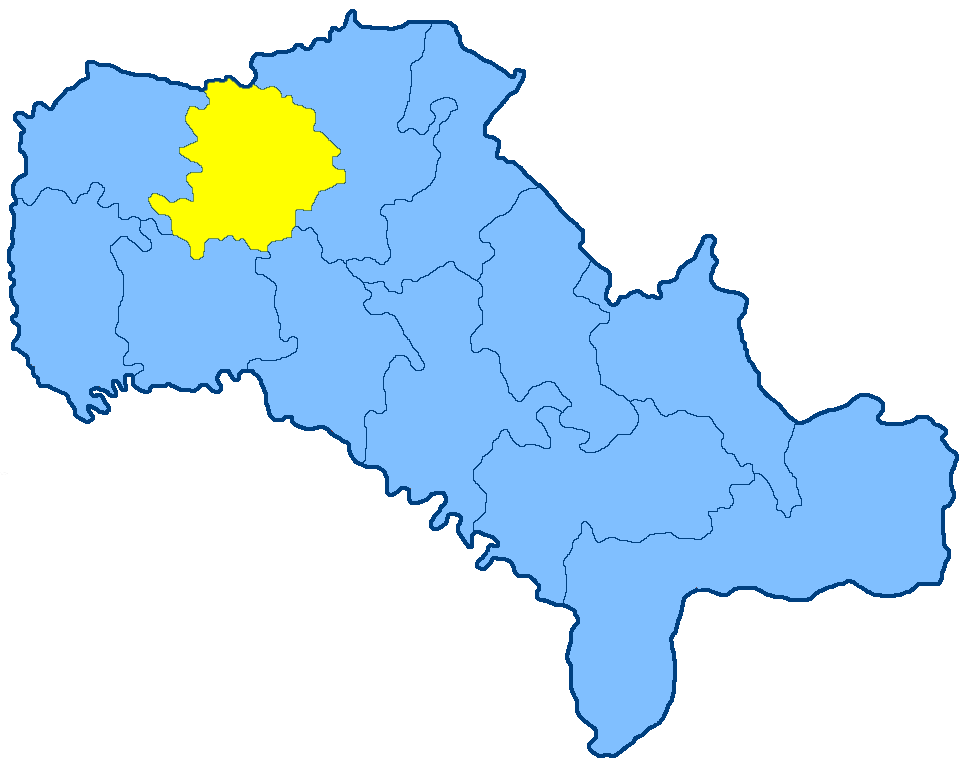
- Location in the Podolia Governorate
- Country: Russian Empire
- Krai: Southwestern
- Governorate: Podolia
- Established: 1795
- Abolished: 1923
- Capital: Letichev

Area
  - Total: 2,699.14 km^{2} (1,042.14 sq mi)

Population (1897)
  - Total: 184,477
  - Density: 68.3466/km^{2} (177.017/sq mi)
  - Urban: 3.93%
  - Rural: 96.07%

The Letichev uezd (Note: Russian: Лети́чевскій уѣ́здъ, romanized: Letíchevskiy uyézd; Ukrainian: Лети́чівський пові́т, romanized: Letýchivsʼkyi povít) was a county (uezd) of the Podolian Governorate of the Russian Empire. The uezd bordered the Starokonstantinov uezd of the Volhynian Governorate, the Litin uezd to the east, the Mogilev uezd to the southeast, the Ushitsa uezd to the south, and the Proskurov uezd to the west. The area of the uezd encompassed most of Khmelnytskyi Raion of Ukraine. The administrative centre of the county was Letichev (contemporary Letychiv).

== Administrative divisions ==
The subcounties (volosts) of the Letichev uezd in 1912 were as follows:

Name	Name in Russian	Capital
Bakhmatov volost	Бахматовецкая волость	Bakhmatov
Voitovtsy volost	Войтовецкая волость	Voitovtsy
Derazhnya volost	Деражнянская волость	Derazhnya
Zhenishkov volost	Женишковецкая волость	Zhenishkov
Zinkov volost	Зиньковская волость	Zinkov
Medzhibozh volost	Меджибожская волость	Stavnitsa
Mikhalpol volost	Михалпольская волость	Mikhalpol
Suslovtsy volost	Сусловецкая волость	Suslovtsy

== Demographics ==
At the time of the Russian Empire Census on 28 January [O.S. 15 January] 1897, the Letichev uezd had a population of 184,477, including 92,618 men and 91,859 women. The majority of the population indicated Little Russian (Note: Prior to 1918, the Imperial Russian government classified Russians as the Great Russians, Ukrainians as the Little Russians, and Belarusians as the White Russians. After the creation of the Ukrainian People's Republic in 1918, the Little Russians identified themselves as "Ukrainian". Also, the Belarusian Democratic Republic which the White Russians identified themselves as "Belarusian".) to be their mother tongue, with a significant Jewish speaking minority.

Linguistic composition of the Letichev uezd in 1897
Language	Native speakers	Percentage
Little Russian	149,120	80.83
Jewish	24,387	13.22
Great Russian	6,809	3.69
Polish	3,164	1.72
Bashkir	405	0.22
Romanian	136	0.07
German	133	0.07
Tatar	121	0.07
Czech	51	0.03
White Russian	27	0.01
French	16	0.01
Chuvash	13	0.01
Cheremis	7	0.00
Mordovian	5	0.00
Votyak	3	0.00
Gipsy	2	0.00
Latvian	2	0.00
Other	76	0.04
Total	184,477	100.00
