= Yampil-Babchyntsi rebellion =

- Part of Russian Civil War and Ukrainian War of Independence
Date	3–10 February 1921
Location	Yampol and Mogilev uezd, Podolia Governorate, Ukrainian SSR
Result	Bolshevik victory: Suppression of the rebellion; Later the leaders of the rebellion were captured; Massacre of Ukrainian civilians

Belligerents
(Ukrainian Soviet Socialist Republic) Bolsheviks	Ukrainian rebels

Commanders and leaders
(Ukrainian Soviet Socialist Republic) Fedir Hankevych (surrendered) (Ukrainian Soviet Socialist Republic) Andriy Reva	Fedir Lozan (POW) (executed); Yakiv Hinets (Lunets) (executed); Tymofiy Pohonets (POW) (executed)

Units involved
Red Army: Kiev Military District; 24th Rifle Division; 66th Regiment; 208th Regiment; 209th Regiment; 210th Regiment; 12th Rifle Division; 35th Brigade; Militsiya	Ukrainian armed peasants

Strength
: c. 8,000–12,000	17,000 rebels

Casualties and losses
: Unknown	>300 rebels killed
- c. 370–400 civilians killed in Olenivka c. 500–1500 civilians killed in Yampol and Mogilev uezd

Yampil-Babchyntsi rebellion broke out in February 1921. Its slogan was For Soviet power without communists and communism.

The formal reason for it was an incident that was almost like a joke: the local militsya and the commandant's team in the village of Babchynci found and confiscated a moonshine still, and the entire population rose to defend its owner. It spread across the territories of the modern Yampol and Mogilev uezd.

The uprising began in the village of Babchyntsi on 3 February 1921, spreading to the Yaruga, Yampol, Babchyntsi and Velykokisnytsia volosts of the Yampol uezd and part of the villages of Mogilev uezd — Shenderivka, Liudvikivka and Sadkivtsi. The actions were coordinated by headquarters: the main (underground) headquarters in Yampil and the field headquarters in Babchyntsi.

The uprising was led by Fedir Ivanovych Lozan, an ensign in the tsarist army, with Yakiv Hinets (Lunets) as his deputy.

The headquarters of the 12th Rifle Division reported that there were 12,000 rebels in the Yampol uezd and 5,000 in the Mogilev uezd, including 200 horsemen ‘without saddles’. The ‘counterrevolutionary movement’ spread to the settlements of Hruska, Sadky, Kosy, Vyla, Bukatynka, Mervyntsi, Bush, Ivankiv, Mykilsk, Babchyntsi, Subotivka, Yaruga, Mykhailivka, Bila, Halzhbiivka, Petrashivka, Myronivka, Porohy, Dobryanka, Dzygiv Brid, Velyka Kysnytsia, Tsekinivka, Volfanivka, Trostianets in the Yampol uezd, and Shenderivka, Liudvikivka, and Sadkivtsi. The rebels drove the Bolsheviks out of the town of Yaruga and the village of Trostyanets, where Ataman Lozan's detachment of three thousand men, half of whom had firearms, dispersed the local Soviet authorities, disarming nearly a hundred Red Army soldiers. However, even after this, the Cossack cavalry – about 500 men – mostly did not have saddles.

The rebels eliminated the Yaruga volost military commissar, an investigator from the special Rumkordon department, and a machine gunner from the penal battalion. Earlier, Ensign Fedir Antonovych Hankevych (born in 1888) had organised underground cells in the villages of Trostianets and Dzygivtsi. During the uprising itself, he served as a senior officer in the Bolshevik guard battalion in Yampil. In February, near Halzhbiivka, where the platoon was supposed to fight the peasants from this village, Bila and Fleminda (a total of about 1,500 people), Hankevych spread panic among his subordinates, which led to their escape to Yampil. The peasants rushed in pursuit, and, influenced by their failures, the Bolsheviks began evacuating their institutions from Mohyliv-Podilskyi and preparing to defend the city.

The rebels stayed in Yampil from 5 to 9 February 1921. They issued a series of orders – on the free circulation of all money (except Soviet money), freedom of trade, proclamations calling for an uprising against the commune, and formed an administration. But the forces were unequal.

On 7 February, the 66th, 208th, 209th and 210th regiments, the 35th brigade of the 12th division, and detachments of police officers from the Mogilev uezd launched an offensive against the rebels.

On 10 February, the uprising was suppressed, the leaders of the uprising were destroyed, more than 300 rebels were killed, and the village of Olenivka in the Mogilev uezd was completely burned down by the 66th regiment of the 24th division. Mobile tribunal sessions were held in the villages, and participants in the uprising were publicly shot.

Fedir Lozan remained in hiding for a long time. On 25 November 1925, he was captured. An extraordinary session of the Mogilev uezd Court sentenced him to death by firing squad. Tymofii Semenovych Pohonets, an otaman from the village of Subotivka, was shot on 17 April 1928.
