= Bratslav uezd =

Bratslav uezd Брацлавскій уѣздъ
- Uezd
- Coat of arms

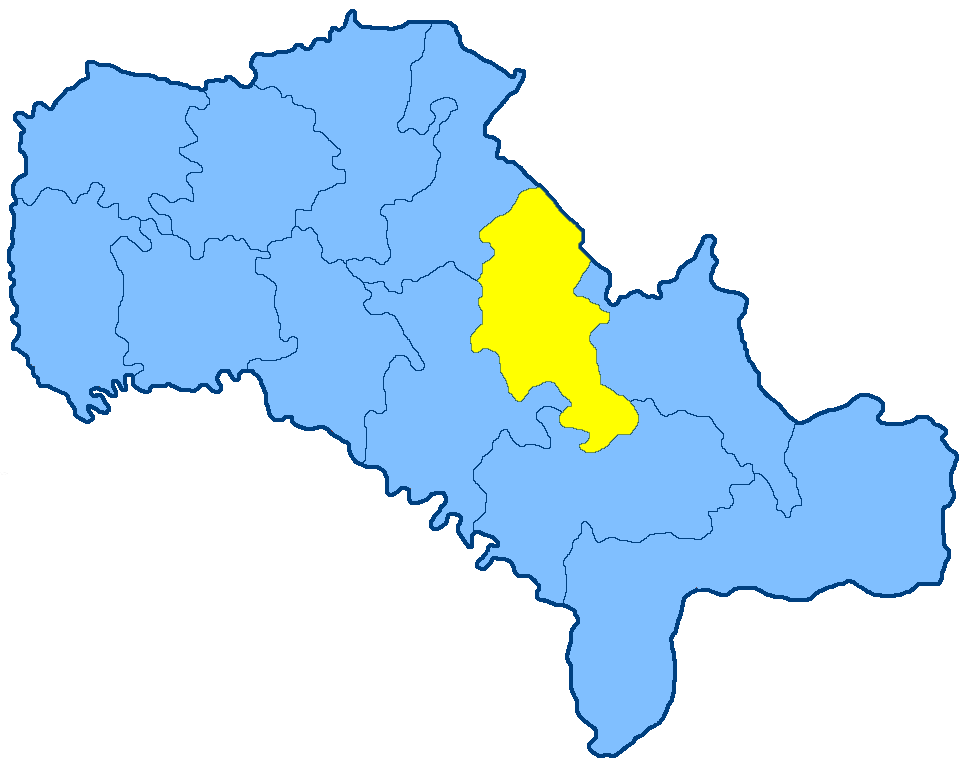
- Location in the Podolia Governorate
- Country: Russian Empire
- Krai: Southwestern
- Governorate: Podolia
- Established: 1797
- Abolished: 1923
- Capital: Bratslav

Area
  - Total: 3,079.93 km^{2} (1,189.17 sq mi)

Population (1897)
  - Total: 241,868
  - Density: 78.5304/km^{2} (203.393/sq mi)
  - Urban: 3.25%
  - Rural: 96.75%

The Bratslav uezd (Note: Russian: Бра́цлавскій уѣ́здъ, romanized: Brátslavskiy uyézd; Ukrainian: Бра́цлавський пові́т, romanized: Brátslavsʼkyi povít) was a county (uezd) of the Podolian Governorate of the Russian Empire. It bordered the Lipovets uezd of the Kiev Governorate to the north, the Gaysin uezd to the east, the Olgopol uezd to the south, the Yampol uezd to the southwest, and the Vinnitsa uezd to the north. The Bratslav uezd was eponymously named for its administrative center, Bratslav.

== Administrative divisions ==
The subcounties (volosts) of the Bratslav uezd in 1912 were as follows:

Name	Name in Russian	Capital
Zhuravlevka volost	Журавлевская волость	Zhuravlevka
Kleban volost	Клебанская волость	Kleban
Luka volost	Лучанская волость	Luka
Grabovtsy volost	Монастырская волость	Grabovtsy
Nemirov volost	Немировская волость	Nemirov
Obodnoe volost	Ободнянская волость	Obodnoe
Ruban volost	Рубанская волость	Ruban
Savintsy volost	Савинецкая волость	Savintsy
Trostyanets volost	Тростянецкая волость	Trostyanets
Kholodovka volost	Холодовская волость	Kholodovka
Shpikov volost	Шпиковская волость	Shpikov

== Demographics ==
At the time of the Russian Empire Census of 28 January [O.S. 15 January] 1897, the Bratslav uezd had a population of 241,868, including 120,261 men and 121,607 women. The majority of the population indicated Little Russian (Note: Prior to 1918, the Imperial Russian government classified Russians as the Great Russians, Ukrainians as the Little Russians, and Belarusians as the White Russians. After the creation of the Ukrainian People's Republic in 1918, the Little Russians identified themselves as "Ukrainian". Also, the Belarusian Democratic Republic which the White Russians identified themselves as "Belarusian".) to be their mother tongue, with a significant Jewish speaking minority.

Linguistic composition of the Bratslav uezd in 1897
Language	Native speakers	Percentage
Little Russian	199,859	82.63
Jewish	28,142	11.64
Great Russian	7,948	3.29
Polish	4,824	1.99
Romanian	331	0.14
German	284	0.12
Tatar	212	0.09
Votyak	65	0.03
Czech	54	0.02
French	47	0.02
White Russian	46	0.02
Bashkir	14	0.01
Cheremis	1	0.00
Chuvash	1	0.00
Latvian	1	0.00
Mordovian	1	0.00
Other	38	0.02
Total	241,868	100.00
