= Balta uezd =

Balta uezd Балтскій уѣздъ
- Uezd
- Coat of arms

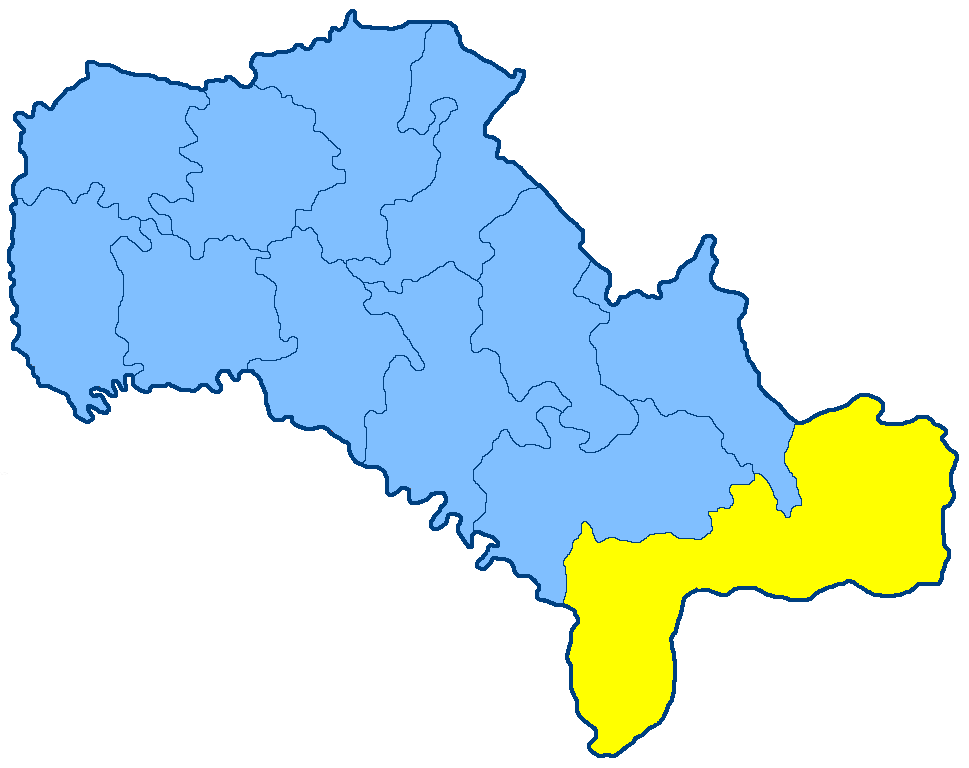
- Location in the Podolia Governorate
- Country: Russian Empire
- Krai: Southwestern
- Governorate: Podolia
- Established: 1796
- Abolished: 12 April 1923
- Capital: Balta

Area
  - Total: 7,766.25 km^{2} (2,998.57 sq mi)

Population (1897)
  - Total: 391,018
  - Density: 50.3484/km^{2} (130.402/sq mi)
  - Urban: 5.97%
  - Rural: 94.03%

The Balta uezd (Note: Russian: Ба́лтскій уѣ́здъ, romanized: Báltskiy uyézd; Ukrainian: Ба́лтський пові́т, romanized: Báltsʼkyi povít) was a county (uezd) of the Podolian Governorate of the Russian Empire. It bordered the Olgopol and Gaysin uezds to the north, the Uman uezd of the Kiev Governorate to the northeast, the Kherson Governorate's Elisavetgrad uezd to the east, and Ananev uezd to the south, and the Orgeev uezd of the Bessarabia Governorate to the west. Its administrative centre was Balta.

== Administrative divisions ==
The subcounties (volosts) of the Balta uezd in 1912 were as follows:

Name	Name in Russian	Capital
Baksha volost	Башканская волость	Baksha
Bandurovka volost	Бандуровская волость	unknown
Bogopol volost	Богопольская волость	Bogopol
Budei volost	Будейская волость	Budei
Velikiy-Bobrik volost	Велико-Бобрикская волость	Velikiy-Bobrik
Velikaya-Mechetna volost	Велико-Мечетнянская волость	Velikaya-Mechetna
Verbovka volost	Вербовская волость	Verbovka
Voronkovo volost	Воронковская волость	Voronkovo
Golovanevsk volost	Голованьская волость	Golovanevsk
Danilova volost	Даниловская волость	Danilova-Balka
Korytno volost	Корытнянская волость	Korytno
Krivo-Ozerskoe volost	Криво-Озерская волость	Krivo-Ozerskoe
Kruty volost	Крутянская волость	Kruty
Lipovenka volost	Липовеньская волость	Lipovenka
Molokish volost	Молокишская волость	Molokish
Moshnyagi volost	Мошнягская волость	Moshnyagi
Nestoita volost	Нестоитская волость	Nestoika
Pereimka volost	Переймская волость	Sarazhinka
Peschany volost	Песчанская волость	Peschany
Pisarevka volost	Писаревская волость	Pisarevka
Savran volost	Савраньская волость	Savran
Triduby volost	Тридубская волость	Triduby
Troyanka volost	Троянская волость	Troyanka
Troyany volost	Трояновская волость	Troyany
Tsybulevka volost	Цыбулевская волость	Tsybulevka
Cherna volost	Чернянская волость	Cherna
Yuzefpol volost	Юзефпольская волость	Yuzefpol

== Demographics ==
At the time of the Russian Empire Census on 28 January [O.S. 15 January] 1897, the Balta uezd had a population of 391,018, including 196,111 men and 194,907 women. The majority of the population indicated Little Russian (Note: Prior to 1918, the Imperial Russian government classified Russians as the Great Russians, Ukrainians as the Little Russians, and Belarusians as the White Russians. After the creation of the Ukrainian People's Republic in 1918, the Little Russians identified themselves as "Ukrainian". Also, the Belarusian Democratic Republic which the White Russians identified themselves as "Belarusian".) to be their mother tongue, with significant Jewish, Romanian and Russian speaking minorities.

Linguistic composition of the Balta uezd in 1897
Language	Native speakers	Percentage
Little Russian	300,543	76.86
Jewish	53,066	13.57
Romanian	17,583	4.50
Great Russian	15,188	3.88
Polish	3,344	0.86
German	260	0.07
Gipsy	243	0.06
Tatar	242	0.06
Czech	205	0.05
Belarusian	109	0.03
Latvian	46	0.01
Mordovian	29	0.01
Chuvash	25	0.01
French	18	0.00
Bashkir	5	0.00
Votyak	3	0.00
Cheremis	1	0.00
Other	108	0.03
Total	391,018	100.00
