= Olgopol uezd =

Olgopol uezd Ольгопольскій уѣздъ
- Uezd
- Coat of arms

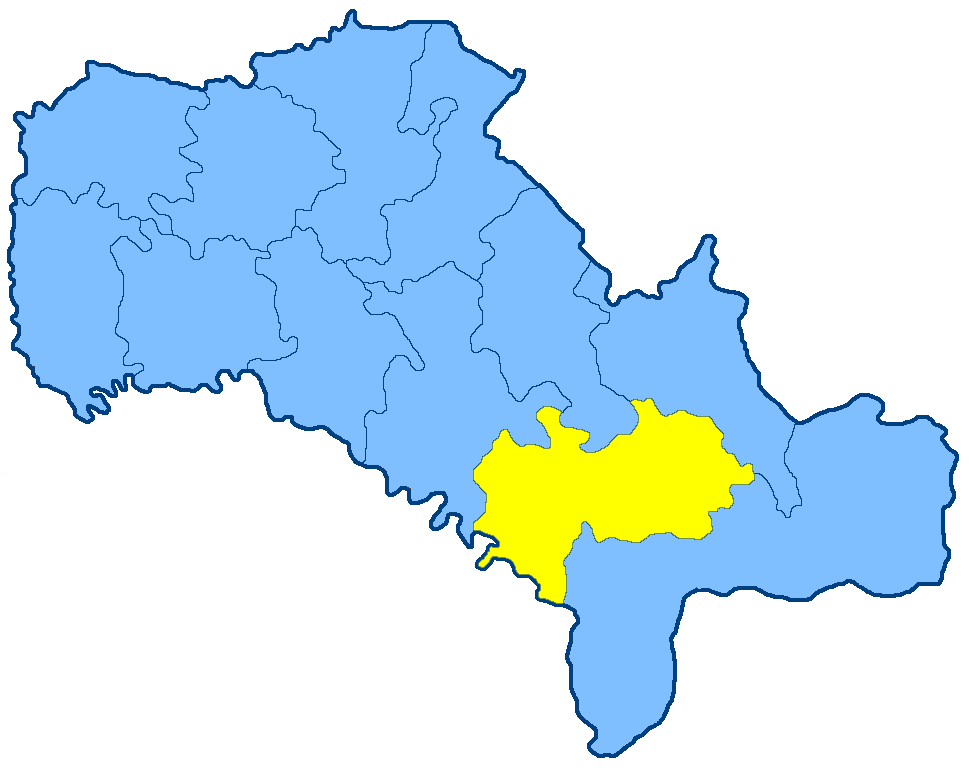
- Location in the Podolia Governorate
- Country: Russian Empire
- Krai: Southwestern
- Governorate: Podolia
- Established: 1795
- Abolished: 1923
- Capital: Olgopol

Area
  - Total: 4,008.14 km^{2} (1,547.55 sq mi)

Population (1897)
  - Total: 284,253
  - Density: 70.9189/km^{2} (183.679/sq mi)
  - Urban: 2.86%
  - Rural: 97.14%

The Olgopol uezd (Note: Russian: Ольго́польскій уѣ́здъ, romanized: Olʼgópolʼskiy uyézd; Ukrainian: Ольго́пільський пові́т, romanized: Olʼhópilʼsʼkyi povít) was a county (uezd) of the Podolia Governorate of the Russian Empire, with its administrative centre in Olgopol (modern-day Olhopil). It bordered the Bratslav and Gaysin uezds to the north, the Balta uezd, the Orgeev uezd of the Bessarabia Governorate to the south, the Yampol uezd to the west.

== Administrative divisions ==
The subcounties (volosts) of the Olgopol uezd in 1912 were as follows:

Name	Name in Russian	Capital
Bershad volost	Бершадская волость	Bershad
Voitovka volost	Войтовская волость	Voitovka
Demovka volost	Демовская волость	Demovka
Zhabokrych volost	Жабокрычская волость	Zhabokrych
Kamenka volost	Каменская волость	Kamenka
Lugi volost	Лугская волость	Lugi
Myastkovka volost	Мястковская волость	Myastkovka
Obodovka volost	Ободовская волость	Obodovka
Peschanka volost	Песчанская волость	Peschanka
Pyatkovka volost	Пятковская волость	Pyatkovka
Rashkov volost	Рашковская волость	Rashkov
Uste volost	Устьянская волость	Uste
Chebotarka volost	Чеботарская волость	Chebotarka
Chechelnik volost	Чечельницкая волость	Chechelnik

== Demographics ==
At the time of the Russian Empire Census on 28 January [O.S. 15 January] 1897, the Olgopol uezd had a population of 284,253, including 140,810 men and 143,443 women. The majority of the population indicated Little Russian (Note: Prior to 1918, the Imperial Russian government classified Russians as the Great Russians, Ukrainians as the Little Russians, and Belarusians as the White Russians. After the creation of the Ukrainian People's Republic in 1918, the Little Russians identified themselves as "Ukrainian". Also, the Belarusian Democratic Republic which the White Russians identified themselves as "Belarusian".) to be their mother tongue, with a significant Jewish speaking minority.

Linguistic composition of the Olgopol in 1897
Language	Native speakers	Percentage
Little Russian	231,991	81.61
Jewish	32,555	11.45
Romanian	8,135	2.86
Great Russian	6,321	2.22
Polish	4,325	1.52
German	592	0.21
Tatar	92	0.03
Czech	72	0.03
White Russian	52	0.02
Romani	39	0.01
French	21	0.01
Chuvash	17	0.01
Latvian	11	0.00
Bashkir	4	0.00
Mordovian	3	0.00
Other	23	0.01
Total	284,253	100.00
