= Kamenets-Podolsky uezd =

Kamenets-Podolsky uezd Каменецъ-Подольскій уѣздъ
- Uezd
- Coat of arms

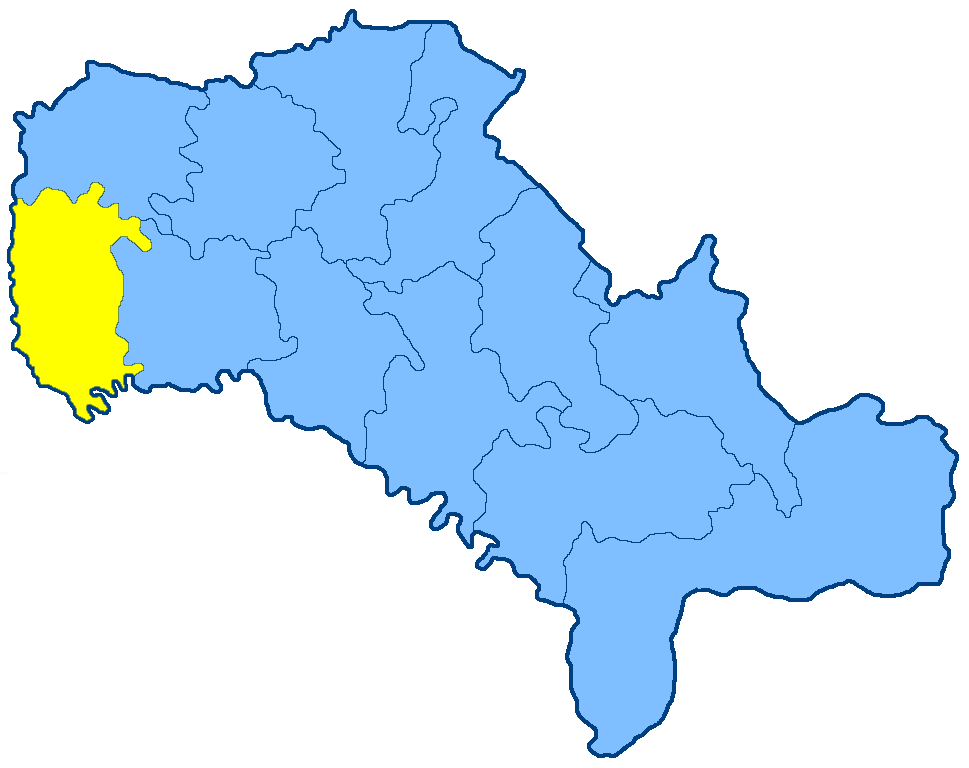
- Location in the Podolia Governorate
- Country: Russian Empire
- Krai: Southwestern
- Governorate: Podolia
- Established: 1795
- Abolished: 1923
- Capital: Kamenets-Podolsky

Area
  - Total: 2,884.19 km^{2} (1,113.59 sq mi)

Population (1897)
  - Total: 266,350
  - Density: 92.348/km^{2} (239.18/sq mi)
  - Urban: 13.49%
  - Rural: 86.51%

The Kamenets-Podolsky uezd (Note: Russian: Ка́менецъ-Подо́льскій уѣ́здъ, romanized: Kámenets-Podólʼskiy uyézd; Ukrainian: Ка́м'янець-Поді́льський пові́т, romanized: Kámianetsʼ-Podílʼsʼkyi povít) was a county (uezd) of the Podolian Governorate of the Russian Empire. The uezd bordered the Proskurov uezd to the north, the Ushitsa uezd to the east, the Khotin uezd to the south, and Austria to the west. Its administrative centre of the county was Kamenets-Podolsky (modern-day Kamianets-Podilskyi). The county covered most of the area of Kamianets-Podilskyi Raion.

== Administrative divisions ==
The subcounties (volosts) of the Kamenets-Podolsky uezd in 1912 were as follows:

Name	Name in Russian	Capital
Bogovitsa volost	Баговицкая волость	Bogovitsa
Balin volost	Балинская волость	Balin
Berezhanka volost	Бережанская волость	Berezhanka
Gavrilovtse volost	Гавриловецкая волость	Gavrilovtse
Gorodok volost	Городокская волость	Gorodok
Dolzhok volost	Должецкая волость	Dolzhok
Kupin volost	Купинская волость	Kupin
Kuyavy volost	Куявская волость	Kuyavy
Lyantskorun volost	Лянцкорунская волость	Lyantskorun
Makov volost	Маковская волость	Makov
Olkhovets volost	Ольховецкая волость	Olkhovets
Orynin volost	Орынинская волость	Orynin
Rykhta volost	Рыхтецкая волость	Rykhta
Smotrich volost	Смотричская волость	Smotrich
Tsykova volost	Цыковская волость	Tsykova

== Demographics ==
At the time of the Russian Empire Census on 28 January [O.S. 15 January] 1897, the Kamenets-Podolsky uezd had a population of 266,350, including 132,750 men and 133,600 women. The majority of the population indicated Little Russian (Note: Prior to 1918, the Imperial Russian government classified Russians as the Great Russians, Ukrainians as the Little Russians, and Belarusians as the White Russians. After the creation of the Ukrainian People's Republic in 1918, the Little Russians identified themselves as "Ukrainian". Also, the Belarusian Democratic Republic which the White Russians identified themselves as "Belarusian".) to be their mother tongue, with significant Jewish and Great Russian speaking minorities.

Linguistic composition of the Kamenets-Podolsky uezd in 1897
Language	Native speakers	Percentage
Little Russian	210,264	92.89
Jewish	37,114	16.40
Great Russian	10,922	4.83
Polish	7,275	3.21
German	230	0.10
Tatar	218	0.10
White Russian	94	0.04
Votyak	76	0.03
French	32	0.01
Czech	30	0.01
Romanian	10	0.00
Bashkir	9	0.00
Cheremis	9	0.00
Mordovian	5	0.00
Chuvash	2	0.00
Gipsy	1	0.00
Latvian	1	0.00
Other	58	0.03
Total	226,350	100.00
