= Proskurov uezd =

Proskurov uezd Проскуровскій уѣздъ
- Uezd
- Coat of arms

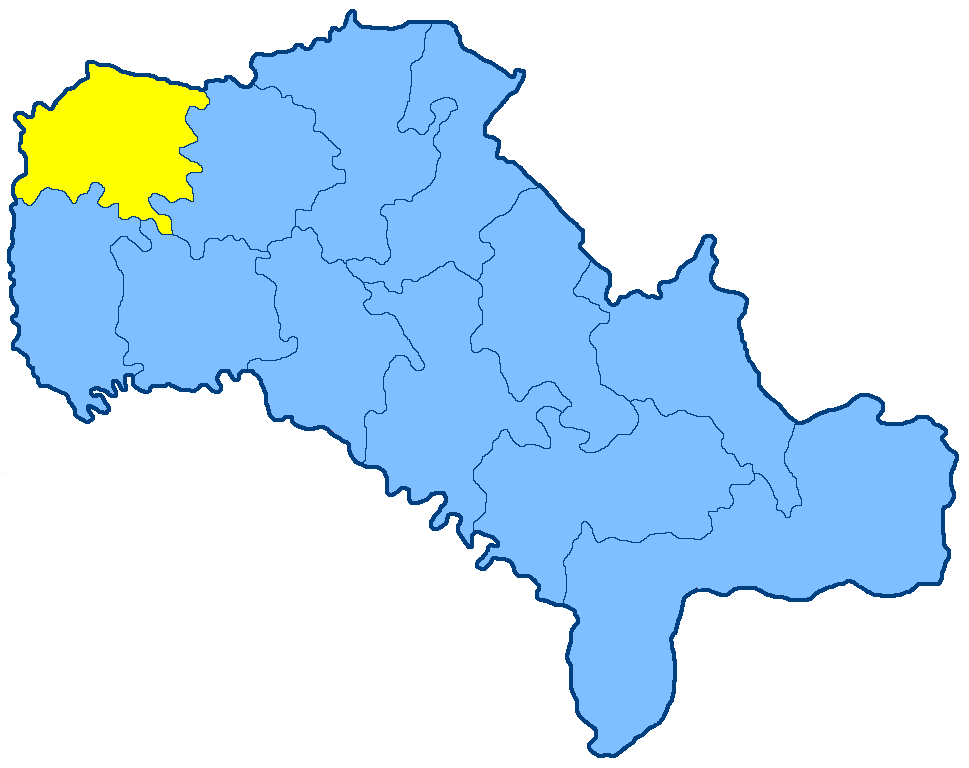
- Location in the Podolia Governorate
- Country: Russian Empire
- Krai: Southwestern
- Governorate: Podolia
- Established: 1795
- Abolished: 1923
- Capital: Proskurov

Area
  - Total: 2,691.06 km^{2} (1,039.02 sq mi)

Population (1897)
  - Total: 226,091
  - Density: 84.0156/km^{2} (217.599/sq mi)
  - Urban: 10.11%
  - Rural: 89.89%

The Proskurov uezd (Note: Russian: Проску́ровскій уѣ́здъ, romanized: Proskúrovskiy uyézd; Ukrainian: Проску́рівський пові́т, romanized: Proskúrivsʼkyi povít) was a county (uezd) of the Podolia Governorate of the Russian Empire, with its administrative centre in Proskurov (contemporary Khmelnytskyi). It border the Starokonstantinov uezd of the Volhynian Governorate to the north, the Letichev uezd to the east, the Kamenets-Podolsky uezd to the south, and Austria to the west. The area of the uezd covered most of Ukraine's Khmelnytskyi Raion.

== Administrative divisions ==
The subcounties (volosts) of the Proskurov uezd in 1912 were as follows:

Name	Name in Russian	Capital
Kuzmino volost	Кузьминская волость	Kuzmino
Malinichi volost	Малиническая волость	Malinichi
Pashkovtsy volost	Пашковецкая волость	Pashkovtsy
Sarnovo volost	Сарновская волость	Sarnovo
Trerelniki volost	Третельникская волость	Tretelniki
Felshtin volost	Фельштинская волость	Felshtin
Cherno-Ostrov volost	Черно-Островская волость	Cherno-Ostrov
Sharovka volost	Шаровская волость	Sharovka
Yurintsy volost	Юринецкая волость	Yurintsy
Yarmolintsy volost	Ярмолинецкая волость	Yarmolintsy

== Demographics ==
At the time of the Russian Empire Census on 28 January [O.S. 15 January] 1897, the Proskurov uezd had a population of 226,091, including 114,020 men and 112,071 women. The majority of the population indicated Little Russian (Note: Prior to 1918, the Imperial Russian government classified Russians as the Great Russians, Ukrainians as the Little Russians, and Belarusians as the White Russians. After the creation of the Ukrainian People's Republic in 1918, the Little Russians identified themselves as "Ukrainian". Also, the Belarusian Democratic Republic which the White Russians identified themselves as "Belarusian".) to be their mother tongue, with significant Jewish and Polish speaking minorities.

Linguistic composition of the Proskurov uezd in 1897
Language	Native speakers	Percentage
Little Russian	176,685	78.15
Jewish	27,299	12.07
Polish	14,512	6.42
Great Russian	6,586	2.91
Tatar	570	0.25
German	179	0.08
Romanian	60	0.03
White Russian	44	0.02
Czech	32	0.01
Chuvash	22	0.01
French	9	0.00
Mordovian	9	0.00
Bashkir	8	0.00
Cheremis	6	0.00
Votyak	5	0.00
Latvian	3	0.00
Other	62	0.03
Total	226,091	100.00
