= Ushitsa uezd =

Ushitsa uezd Ушицкій уѣздъ
- Uezd
- Coat of arms

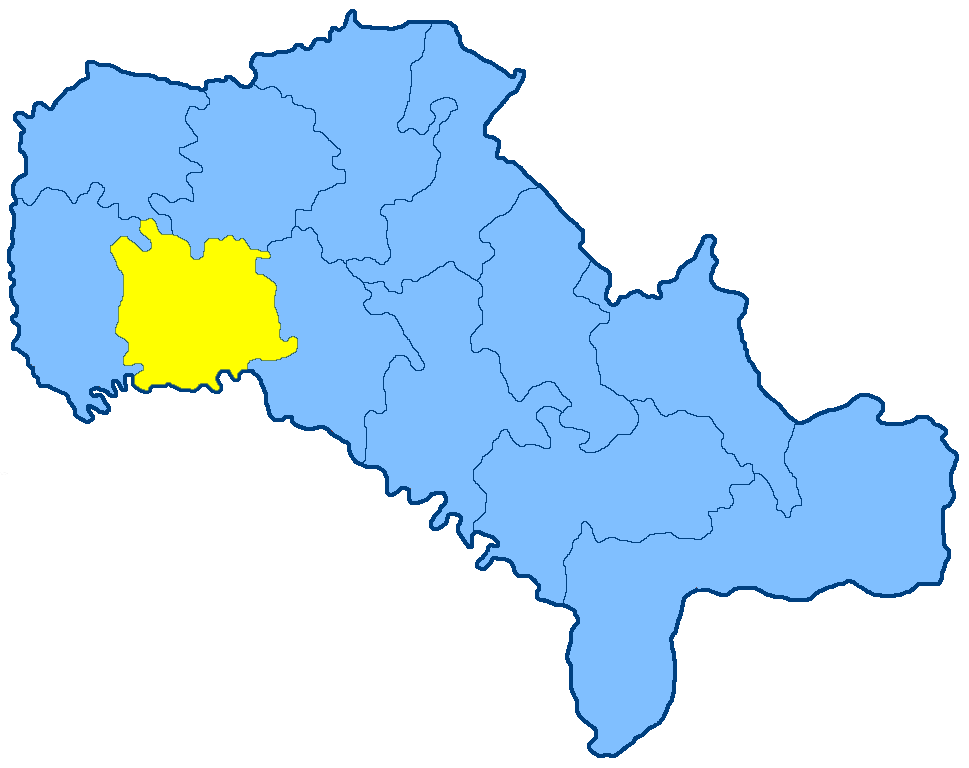
- Location in the Podolia Governorate
- Country: Russian Empire
- Krai: Southwestern
- Governorate: Podolia
- Established: 1795
- Abolished: 1923
- Capital: Novaya Ushytsa

Area
  - Total: 2,840.26 km^{2} (1,096.63 sq mi)

Population (1897)
  - Total: 223,312
  - Density: 78.6238/km^{2} (203.635/sq mi)
  - Urban: 5.76%
  - Rural: 94.24%

The Ushitsa uezd (Note: Russian: У́шицкій уѣ́здъ, romanized: Úshitskiy uyézd; Ukrainian: У́шицький пові́т, romanized: Úshytsʼkyi povít) was a county (uezd) of the Podolia Governorate of the Russian Empire. The uezd bordered Letichev uezd to the north, the Mogilev uezd to the east, the Khotin uezd of the Bessarabia Governorate to the south, and the Kamenets-Podolsky uezd to the west. It included most of Kamianets-Podilskyi Raion of Ukraine. The district was eponymously named for its administrative center, Novaya Ushitsa (modern-day Nova Ushytsia).

== Administrative divisions ==
The subcounties (volosts) of the Ushitsa uezd in 1912 were as follows:

Name	Name in Russian	Capital
Grushka volost	Грушская волость	Grushka
Dunaevtsy volost	Дунаевецкая волость	Dunaevtsy
Kalyus volost	Калюсская волость	Kalyus
Kapustyantsy volost	Капустянская волость	Kapustyantsy
Kitai-Gorod volost	Китай-Городская волость	Kitai-Gorod
Kosikovtsy volost	Косиковецкая волость	Kosikovtsy
Lystsy volost	Лысецская волость	Zhvanchik
Minkovtsy volost	Миньковецкая волость	Minkovtsy
Mukarov volost	Мукаровская волость	Podlesnyi-Mukarov
Murovannye-Kurilovtsy volost	Мурованно-Куриловецкая волость	Murovannye-Kurilovtsy
Oslamov volost	Осламовская волость	Oslamov
Pilipkovtsy volost	Пилипковецкая волость	Pilipkovtsy
Rakhnovka volost	Рахновецкая волость	Rakhnovka
Solobkovtsy volost	Солобковецкая волость	Solobkovtsy
Strugi volost	Стругская волость	Strugi

== Demographics ==
At the time of the Russian Empire Census of 1897, Ushitsky Uyezd had a population of 223,312. Of these, 84.6% spoke Ukrainian, 11.4% Yiddish, 2.3% Russian, 1.2% Polish, 0.4% German and 0.1% Moldovan or Romanian as their native language.
