= Stanisław Chlebowski =

Polish painter (1835–1884)

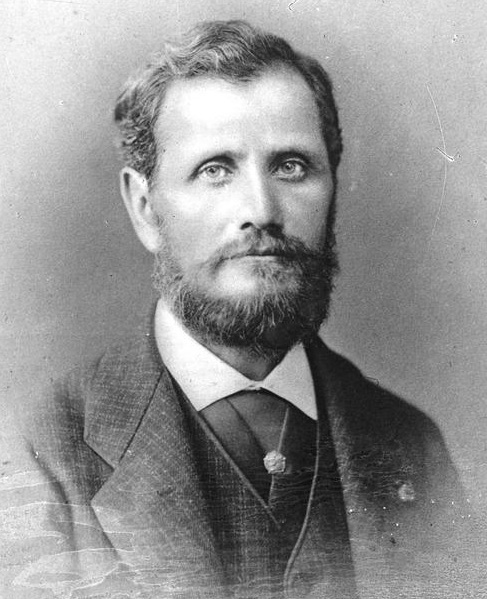
- Born: 1835; Pokutyntsi, Russian Empire
- Died: 1884 (aged 48–49); Kowanówko, German Empire
- Resting place: Rakowicki Cemetery, Kraków, Poland
- Education: Grekov Odessa Art school Imperial Academy of Arts; Jean-Léon Gérôme
- Movement: Orientalist
- Awards: Big Gold Medal of the Imperial Academy of Arts (1859)

Stanisław Chlebowski (1835–1884) was a Polish painter. He was a renowned specialist in Oriental themes and history painting.

== Biography ==
Chlebowski was born to Polish parents in the village of Pokutyntsi (Pokutyńce), which was then in the Ushitsky Uyezd and Podolian Governorate of the Russian Empire and is now Khmelnytskyi Raion, Ukraine. The village and its region once constituted the easternmost periphery of the Polish–Lithuanian Commonwealth prior to the Partitions of Poland at the end of the 18th century. Following the partitions, the area was annexed by Russia.

Chlebowski initially learned drawing in Grekov Odessa Art school. Between 1853 and 1859, he studied at the Academy of Fine Arts in St. Petersburg, and then on a scholarship for six years in Paris as the pupil of the French Orientalist painter Jean-Léon Gérôme. Chlebowski traveled to Spain, Italy, Germany, and Belgium. His first success was selling his painting Joanne d’Arc in Amiens Prison to Napoleon III of France.

In the years 1864-1876 Chlebowski was the master painter under the service of Sultan Abdülaziz and took up residence in Constantinople. Chlebowski became popular in the empire. During his services, he had obtained permission to bring with him a large icon of Mother of God Leading Our Way having been rescued from the Hodegon Monastery in 1453. He had come across it in one of the antique stores in Constantinople, untouched by its Turkish conservator. This account is certified in a letter by the Comité National Polonais à Constantinople, dated June 27, 1938.

In 1876 he moved to Paris. In 1881 he returned permanently to Kraków. The subject matter of his watercolours and oil paintings is diverse. He painted images of historical battles related to the history of Turkey and Ottoman Empire, oriental genre scenes, landscapes, and portraits of Ottoman sultans.

He died in Kowanówko (then officially named Rundhausen in what was then the German Empire, now Poland) at age 49, and was buried at the Rakowicki Cemetery in Kraków.

Chlebowski lived abroad for a long time and as a result his paintings were very rare in Poland. The National Museum in Kraków houses some of his other important Orientalist works such as Entrée de Mahomet II à Stamboul.

== Selected works ==
- Entry of Sultan Mehmed II to Constantinople at the Gate of the City (1873, Entrée de Mahomet II à Stamboul)
- Turkish sentry (1880)
- The time of prayer
- Sultan Bayezid in captivity of Tamerlane (1878)
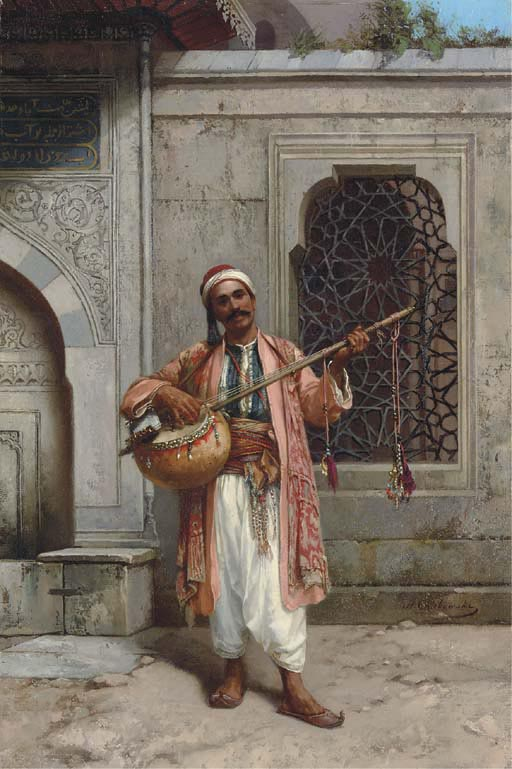
Musician in Constantinople

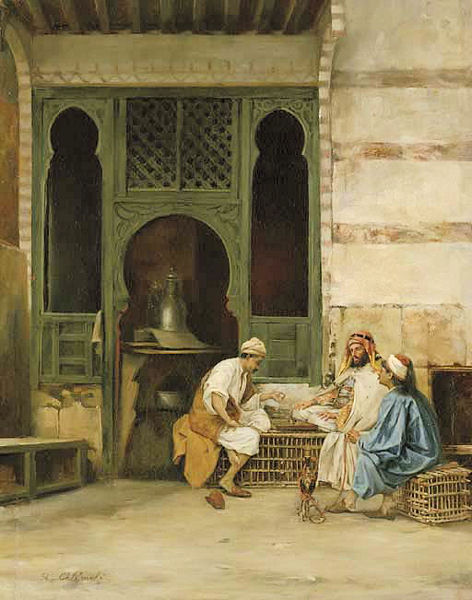
Chess Players, Cairo

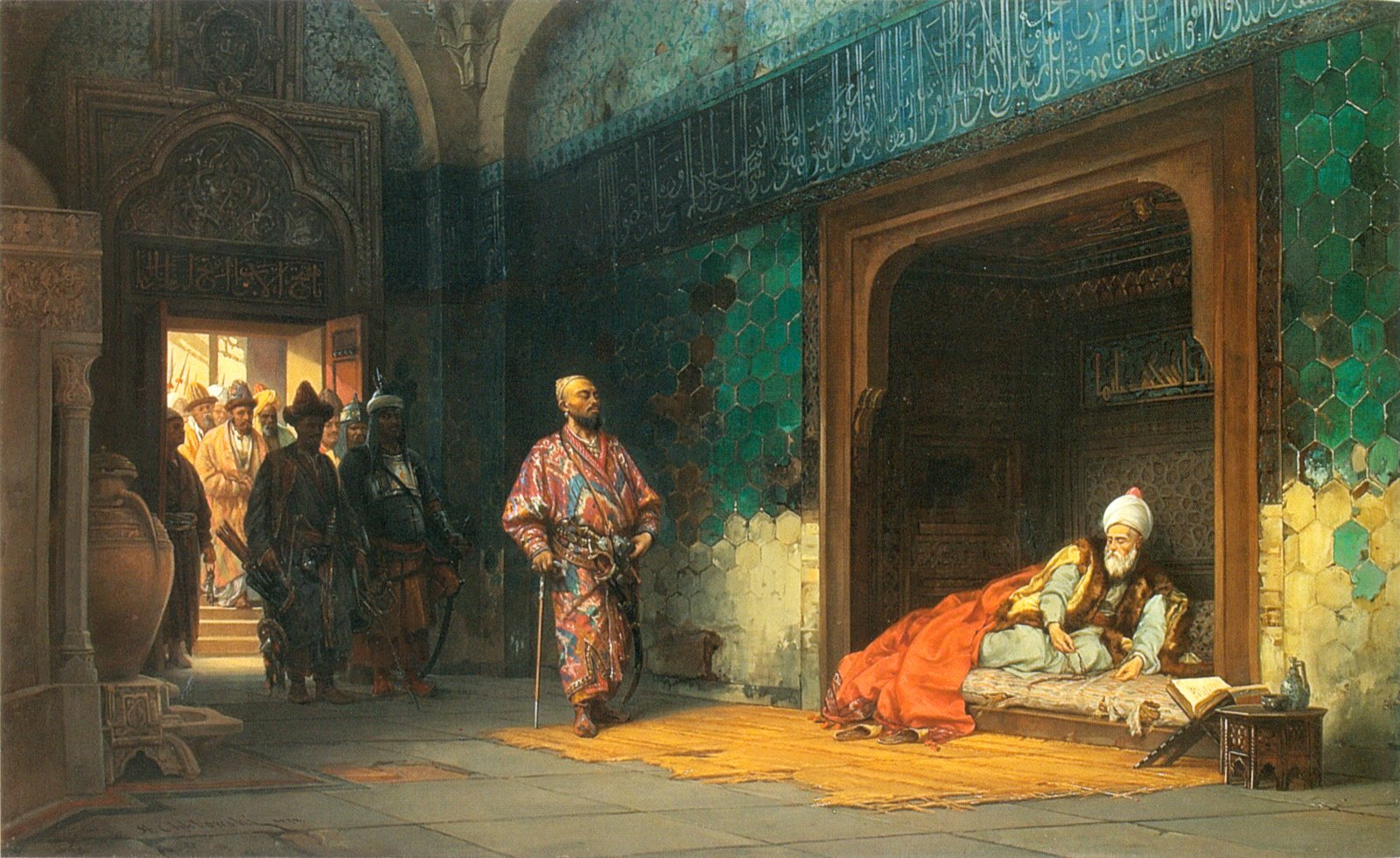
Sultan Bayezid prisoned by Timur

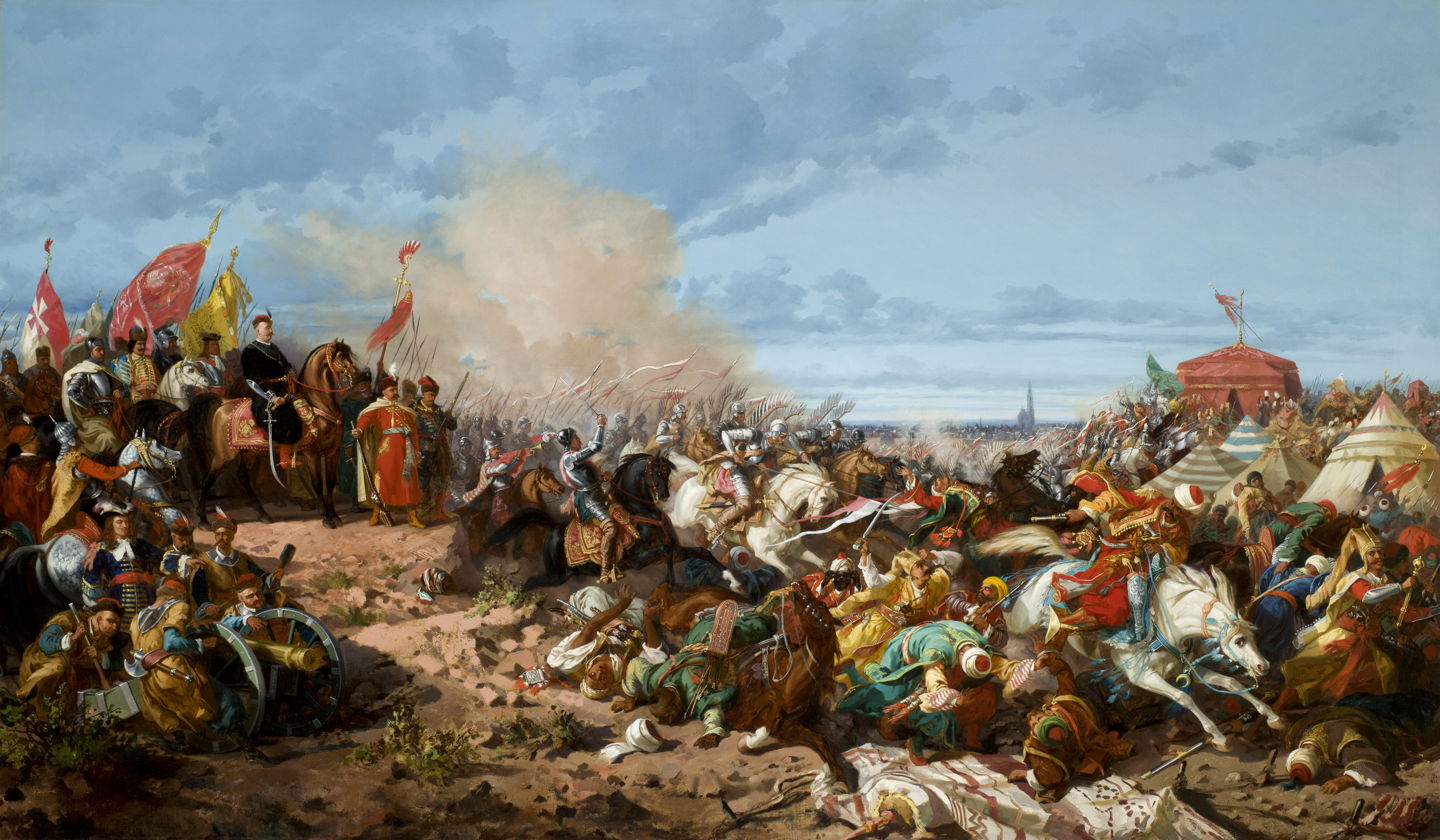
Sobieski at Vienna

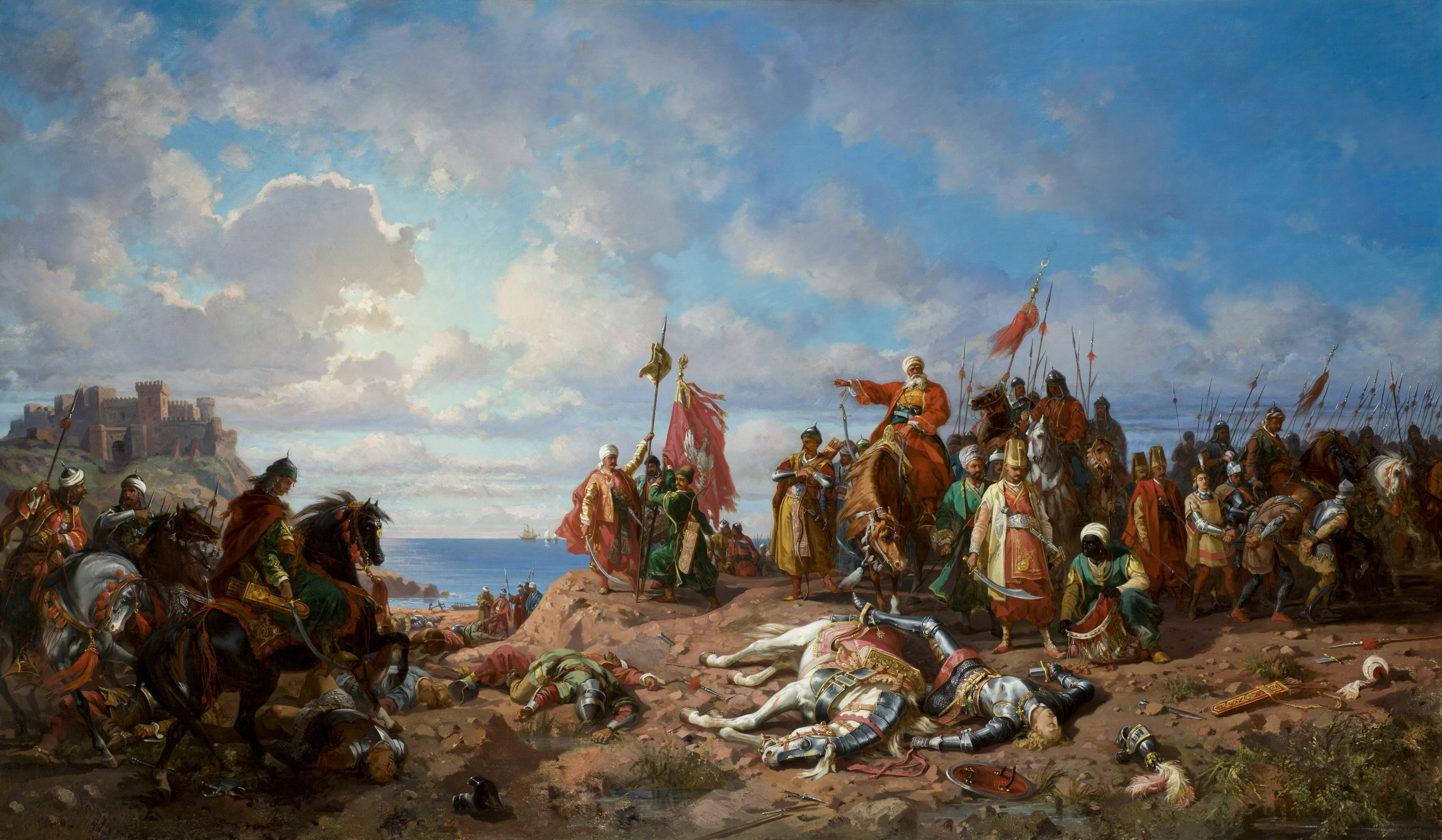
Death of Władysław III of Poland at the Battle of Varna

== See also ==
- List of Orientalist artists
- Orientalism
