= Vinnitsa uezd =

Vinnitsa uezd Винницкій уѣздъ
- Uezd
- Coat of arms

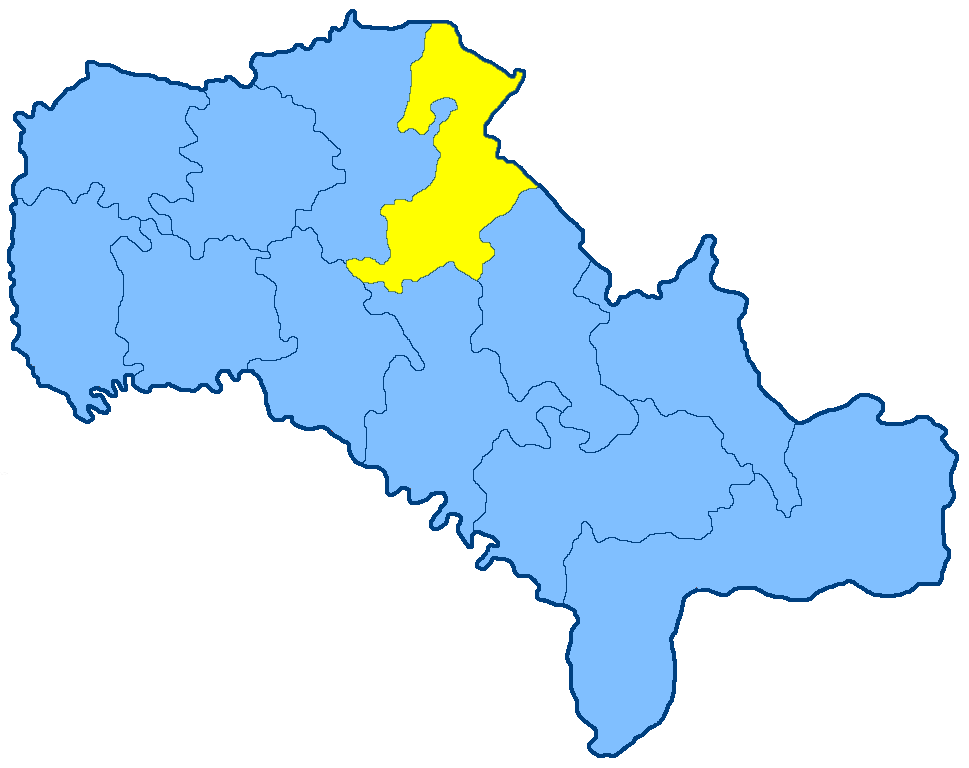
- Location in the Podolia Governorate
- Country: Russian Empire
- Krai: Southwestern
- Governorate: Podolia
- Established: 1795
- Abolished: 1923
- Capital: Vinnitsa

Area
  - Total: 2,980.92 km^{2} (1,150.94 sq mi)

Population (1897)
  - Total: 248,314
  - Density: 83.3011/km^{2} (215.749/sq mi)
  - Urban: 12.31%
  - Rural: 87.69%

The Vinnitsa uezd (Note: Russian: Ви́нницкій уѣ́здъ, romanized: Vínnitskiy uyézd; Ukrainian: Ві́нницький повіт, romanized: Vínnytsʼkyi povít) was a county (uezd) of the Podolian Governorate of the Russian Empire. The uezd bordered the Zhitomir uezd of the Volhynian Governorate to the north, the Berdichev uezd of the Kiev Governorate to the northeast, the Bratslav uezd to the east, the Yampol uezd to the south, and the Litin uezd to the west. The administrative centre of the county was Vinnitsa (modern-day Vinnytsia). The county composed most of Vinnytsia Raion of contemporary Ukraine.

== Administrative divisions ==
The subcounties (volosts) of the Vinnitsa uezd in 1912 were as follows:

Name	Name in Russian	Capital
Bolshoi-Ostrozhek volost	Больше-Острожецкая волость	Bolshoi-Ostrozhek
Brailov volost	Браиловская волость	Brailov
Gavrishovka volost	Гавришовская волость	Gavrishovka
Kalinovka volost	Калиновская волость	Kalinovka
Maloe-Kutyshche volost	Мало-Кутыщанская волость	Maloe-Kutyshche
Pikov volost	Пиковская волость	Pikov
Stanislavchik volost	Станиславчикская волость	Stanislavchik
Strizhavka volost	Стрижавская волость	Strizhavka
Tyvrov volost	Тывровская волость	Tyvrov
Yuzvin volost	Юзвинская волость	Yuzvin

== Demographics ==
At the time of the Russian Empire Census on 28 January [O.S. 15 January] 1897, the Vinnitsa uezd had a population of 248,314, including 127,006 men and 121,308 women. The majority of the population indicated Little Russian (Note: Prior to 1918, the Imperial Russian government classified Russians as the Great Russians, Ukrainians as the Little Russians, and Belarusians as the White Russians. After the creation of the Ukrainian People's Republic in 1918, the Little Russians identified themselves as "Ukrainian". Also, the Belarusian Democratic Republic which the White Russians identified themselves as "Belarusian".) to be their mother tongue, with significant Jewish, Great Russian and Polish speaking minorities.

Linguistic composition of the Vinnitsa uezd in 1897
Language	Native speakers	Percentage
Little Russian	184,847	74.44
Jewish	30,742	12.38
Russian	17,664	7.11
Polish	12,690	5.11
Bashkir	634	0.26
Tatar	539	0.22
German	352	0.14
White Russian	231	0.09
Czech	186	0.07
Mordovian	80	0.03
Chuvash	56	0.02
Gipsy	56	0.02
Cheremis	53	0.02
Latvian	37	0.01
French	26	0.01
Votyak	25	0.01
Romanian	19	0.00
Other	77	0.03
Total	248,314	100.00
