= Mogilev uezd (Podolia Governorate) =

Mogilev uezd Могилевскій уѣздъ
- Uezd
- Coat of arms

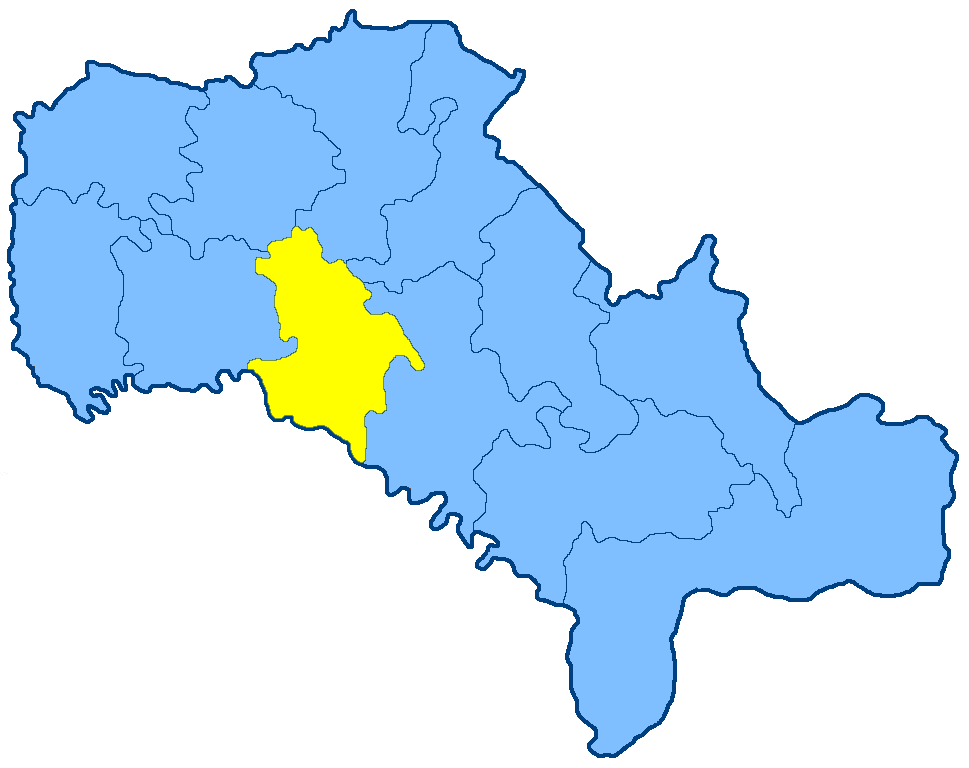
- Location in the Podolia Governorate
- Country: Russian Empire
- Krai: Southwestern
- Governorate: Podolia
- Established: 1795
- Abolished: 1923
- Capital: Mogilev-Podolsky

Area
  - Total: 2,746.14 km^{2} (1,060.29 sq mi)

Population (1897)
  - Total: 227,672
  - Density: 82.9062/km^{2} (214.726/sq mi)
  - Urban: 14.19%
  - Rural: 85.81%

The Mogilev uezd (Note: Russian: Могиле́вскій уѣ́здъ, romanized: Mogilévskiy uyézd; Ukrainian: Могилі́вський пові́т, romanized: Mohylívsʼkyi povít) was a county (uezd) of the Podolia Governorate of the Russian Empire. It bordered the Letichev and Litin uezds to the north, the Yampol uezd to the east, the Soroka uezd to the south, and the Ushitsa uezd to the west. The administrative centre of the county was Mogilev-Podolsky (modern-day Mohyliv-Podilskyi). The uezd included most of Mohyliv-Podilskyi and Zhmerynka Raions of Ukraine.

== Administrative divisions ==
The subcounties (volosts) of the Mogilev uezd in 1912 were as follows:

Name	Name in Russian	Capital
Bronitsa volost	Броницкая волость	Bronitsa
Vendychany volost	Вендычанская волость	Vendychany
Kopai-Gorod volost	Копай-Городская волость	Kopai-Gorod
Kotyuzhany volost	Котюжанская волость	Vysshiy Olchedaev
Kukavka volost	Кукавская волость	Kukavka
Luchinets volost	Лучинецкая волость	Luchinets
Maryanovka volost	Марьяновская волость	Maryanovka
Ozarintsy volost	Озаринецкая волость	Ozarintsy
Belyany-Shargorod volost	Сербянская волость	Belyany-Shargorod
Snitkov volost	Снитковская волость	Snikov
Tereshki volost	Терешковская волость	Tereshki
Khonkovtsy volost	Хоньковская волость	Khonkovtsy
Shargorod volost	Шаргородская волость	Shargorod
Yaryshev volost	Ярышевская волость	Yaryshev

== Demographics ==
At the time of the Russian Empire Census on 28 January [O.S. 15 January] 1897, the Mogilev uezd had a population of 227,672, including 112,856 men and 114,816 women. The majority of the population indicated Little Russian (Note: Prior to 1918, the Imperial Russian government classified Russians as the Great Russians, Ukrainians as the Little Russians, and Belarusians as the White Russians. After the creation of the Ukrainian People's Republic in 1918, the Little Russians identified themselves as "Ukrainian". Also, the Belarusian Democratic Republic which the White Russians identified themselves as "Belarusian".) to be their mother tongue, with a significant Jewish speaking minority.

Linguistic composition of the Mogilev uezd in 1897
Language	Native speakers	Percentage
Little Russian	183,353	80.53
Jewish	33,036	14.51
Great Russian	6,377	2.80
Polish	4,249	1.87
German	175	0.08
Tatar	121	0.05
Czech	101	0.04
White Russian	98	0.04
Cheremis	40	0.02
French	25	0.01
Romanian	23	0.01
Bashkir	19	0.01
Cheremis	18	0.01
Latvian	3	0.00
Gipsy	2	0.00
Other	32	0.01
Total	227,672	100.00
