= Yampol uezd =

Yampol uezd Ямпольскій уѣздъ
- Uezd
- Coat of arms

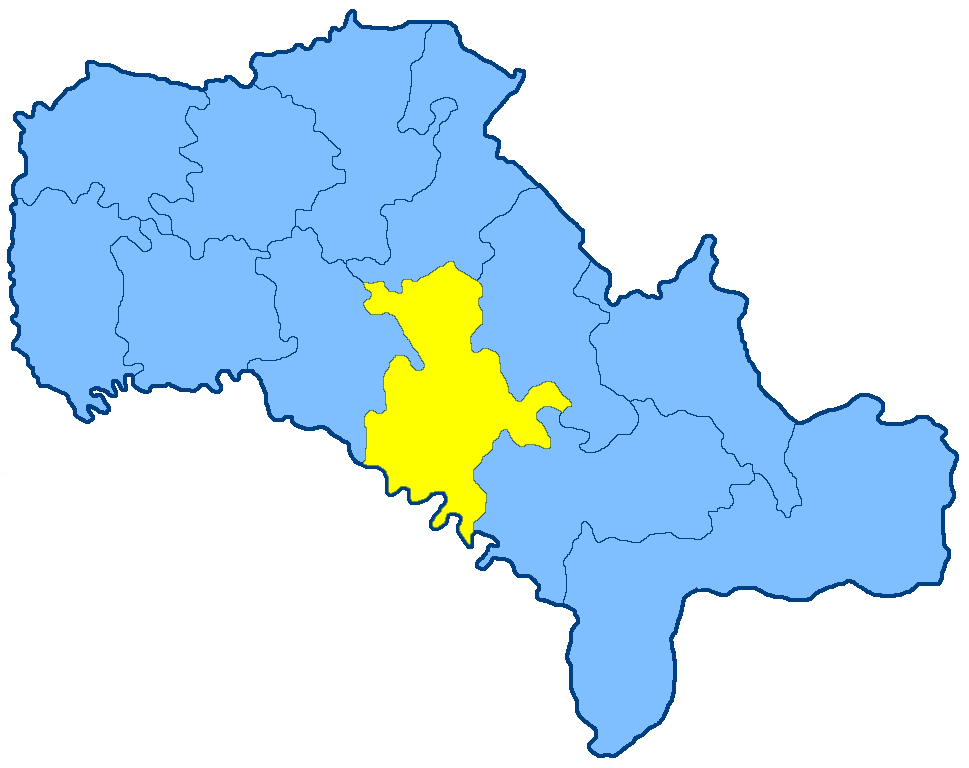
- Location in the Podolia Governorate
- Country: Russian Empire
- Krai: Southwestern
- Governorate: Podolia
- Established: 1795
- Abolished: 1923
- Capital: Yampol

Area
  - Total: 3,618.01 km^{2} (1,396.92 sq mi)

Population (1897)
  - Total: 266,300
  - Density: 73.60/km^{2} (190.6/sq mi)
  - Urban: 2.48%
  - Rural: 97.52%

The Yampol uezd (Note: Russian: Я́мпольскій уѣ́здъ, romanized: Yámpolʼskiy uyézd; Ukrainian: Я́мпільський пові́т, romanized: Yámpilʼsʼkyi povít) was a county (uezd) of the Podolia Governorate of the Russian Empire. It bordered the Vinnitsa uezd to the north, the Bratslav and Olgopol uezds to the east, the Soroka uezd to the south, and the Mogilev uezd to the west. The district was eponymously named for its administrative center, Yampol (modern-day Yampil).

== Administrative divisions ==
The subcounties (volosts) of the Yampol uezd in 1912 were as follows:

Name	Name in Russian	Capital
Babchintsy volost	Бабчинецкая волость	Babchintsy
Velikaya Kosnitsa volost	Велико-Косницкая волость	Velikaya Kosnitsa
Dzygovka volost	Дзыговская волость	Dzygovka
Klembovka volost	Клембовская волость	Klembovka
Komar-Gorod volost	Комаръ-Городская волость	Komar-Gorod
Krasnoe volost	Краснянская волость	Krasnoe
Murafa volost	Мурафская волость	Murafa
Penkovka volost	Пеньковская волость	Penkovka
Rozhnyatovka volost	Рожнятовская волость	Rozhnyatovka
Timanovskaya volost	Тимановская волость	Lipovka-Timanovskaya
Tomashpol volost	Томашпольская волость	Tomashpol
Chernovtsy volost	Черновецкая волость	Chernovtsy
Yampol volost	Ямпольская волость	Yampol
Yaruga volost	Яругаская волость	Yaruga

== Demographics ==
At the time of the Russian Empire Census on 28 January [O.S. 15 January] 1897, the Yampol uezd had a population of 266,300, including 131,330 men and 134,970 women. The majority of the population indicated Little Russian (Note: Prior to 1918, the Imperial Russian government classified Russians as the Great Russians, Ukrainians as the Little Russians, and Belarusians as the White Russians. After the creation of the Ukrainian People's Republic in 1918, the Little Russians identified themselves as "Ukrainian". Also, the Belarusian Democratic Republic which the White Russians identified themselves as "Belarusian".) to be their mother tongue, with a significant Jewish speaking minority.

Linguistic composition of the Yampol uezd in 1897
Language	Native speakers	Percentage
Little Russian	228,102	85.66
Jewish	27,744	10.42
Great Russian	4,966	1.86
Polish	4,716	1.77
German	586	0.22
Romanian	50	0.02
Czech	39	0.01
French	26	0.01
Gipsy	23	0.01
White Russian	10	0.00
Mordovian	3	0.00
Tatar	3	0.00
Latvian	2	0.00
Votyak	1	0.00
Other	29	0.01
Total	266,300	100.00
