= Alexander Bezak =

Imperial Russian Army general

Alexander Pavlovich Bezak
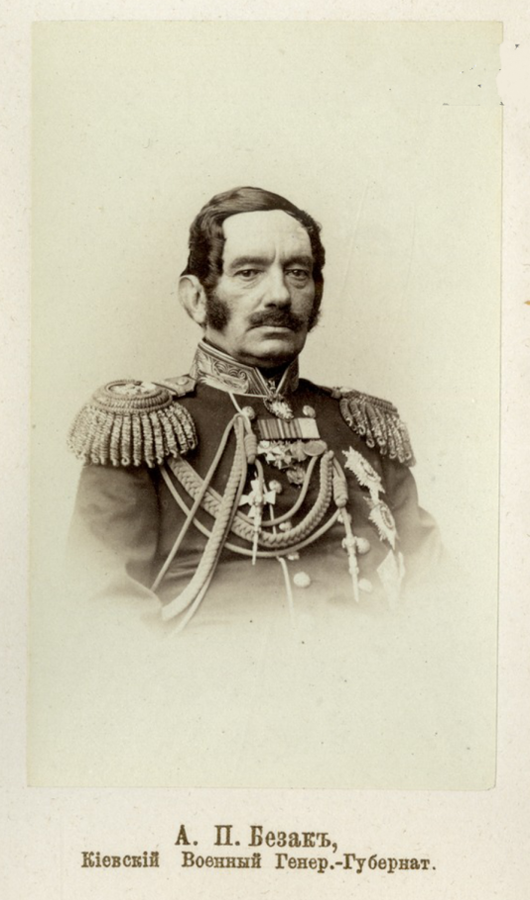
- Born: 1800
- Died: December 30, 1868 (aged 67–68) Saint Petersburg, Russian Empire
- Allegiance: Russian Empire
- Branch: Imperial Russian Army
- Commands: Kiev Military District
- Conflicts: Russo-Turkish War; November Uprising; Crimean War

Alexander Pavlovich Bezak (Russian: Александр Павлович Безак, 1800 – December 30, 1868) was an Imperial Russian Army general. He commanded the Kiev Military District from 1865 to 1868, and simultaneously was Governor-General of the Southwestern Krai. During his time as the governor-general of the Southwestern Krai, he implemented civil and economic reforms, which included promoting the advancement of ethnic Russian bureaucrats and reducing the rights available to the Polish szlachta and Jews.

Preceded by Nicholas Annenkov	Commander of the Kiev Military District; January 19, 1865 – December 30, 1868	Succeeded by
