= Lipovets uezd =

Lipovets uezd Липовецкий уезд
- Uezd
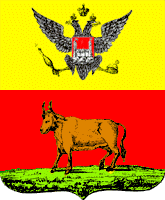
- Coat of arms

- Location in the Kiev Governorate
- Country: Russian Empire
- Krai: Southwestern
- Governorate: Kiev
- Established: 1796
- Abolished: 1923
- Capital: Lipovets

Area
  - Total: 2,891 km^{2} (1,116 sq mi)

Population (1897)
  - Total: 211,825
  - Density: 73.27/km^{2} (189.8/sq mi)

The Lipovets uezd (Russian: Липовецкий уезд; Ukrainian: Липовецький повіт, romanized: Lypovets'kyi povit) was one of the subdivisions of the Kiev Governorate of the Russian Empire. It was situated in the southwestern part of the governorate. Its administrative centre was Lipovets (Lypovets).

== Demographics ==
At the time of the Russian Empire Census of 1897, Lipovetsky Uyezd had a population of 211,825. Of these, 82.0% spoke Ukrainian, 15.0% Yiddish, 1.9% Polish and 1.1% Russian as their native language.
