= Bratslav =

Rural locality in Vinnytsia Oblast, Ukraine

Bratslav Брацлав Bracław בראַסלעװ
- Rural settlement
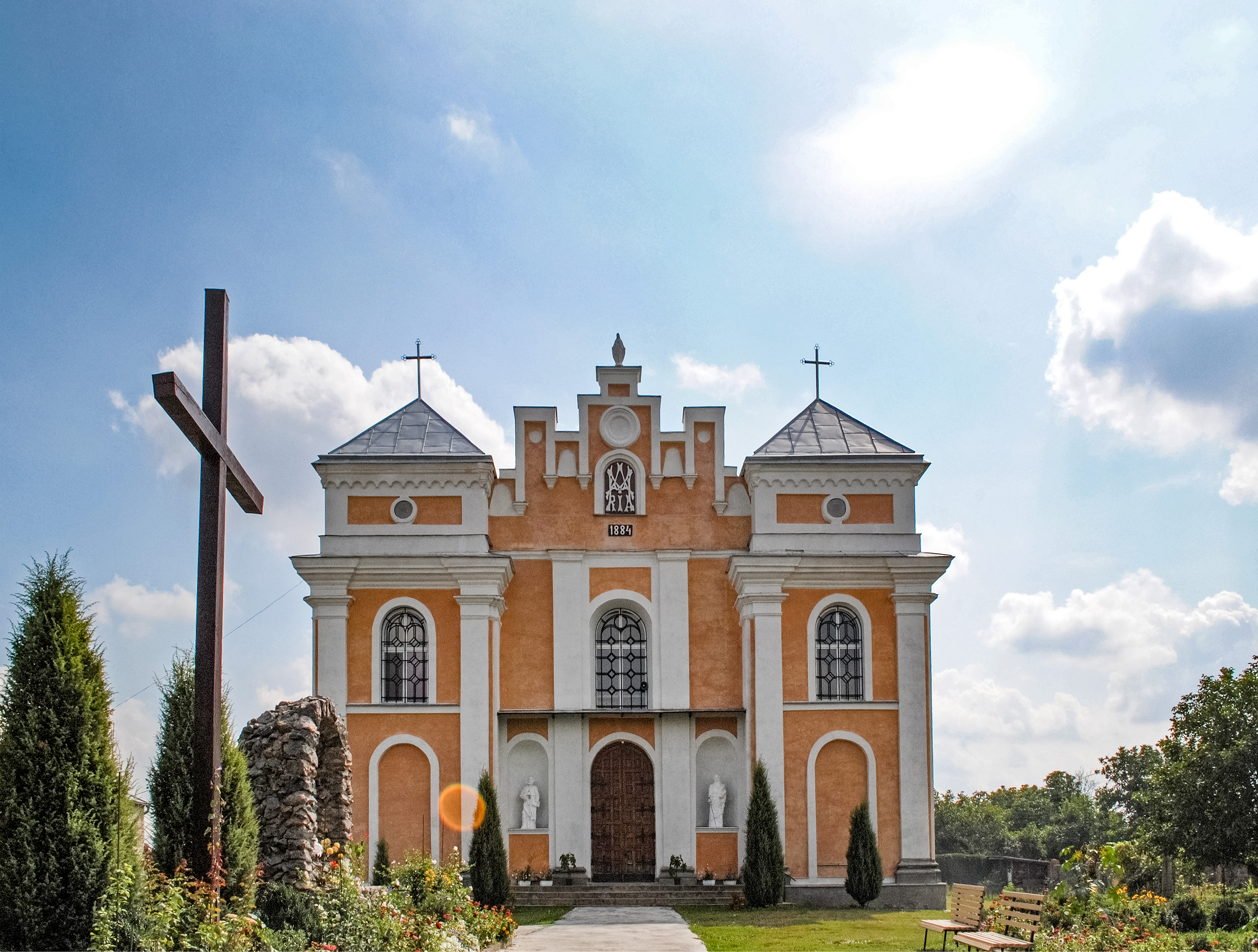
- Church of Our Lady of the Scapular

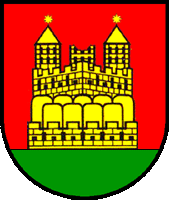
- Coat of arms
- Interactive map of Bratslav
- Location of Bratslav within Vinnytsia Oblast Location of Bratslav within Ukraine
- Coordinates: 48°48′53″N 28°56′41″E
- Country: Ukraine
- Oblast: Vinnytsia Oblast
- Raion: Tulchyn Raion
- Hromada: Bratslav settlement hromada
- Founded: 1362

Area
  - Total: 19.2 km^{2} (7.4 sq mi)
- Elevation: 201 m (659 ft)

Population (2022)
  - Total: 4,872
  - Density: 254/km^{2} (657/sq mi)
- Time zone: UTC+02:00 (EET)
  - Summer (DST): UTC+03:00 (EEST)
- Postal code: 22870—871
- Area code: +380 4331

Bratslav (Ukrainian: Брацлав, IPA: [ˈbrɑtslɐu̯]; Yiddish: בראַסלעװ) is a rural settlement in Tulchyn Raion, Vinnytsia Oblast, Ukraine, on the Southern Bug river. It is a historic centre of eastern Podolia and was formerly the capital of the Bracław Voivodeship of the Polish–Lithuanian Commonwealth. Population: 4,872 (2022 estimate).

== Name ==
In addition to the Ukrainian name Брацлав (Bratslav), the town is known in Polish as Bracław and in Yiddish as בראַסלעװ (Bratslev). The name is also rendered as Breslev or Breslov, particularly in connection with Breslov Hasidism, which originated in the town.

== History ==
The first written mention of Bratslav dates to 1362. It belonged to the Grand Duchy of Lithuania until the Union of Lublin in 1569, when it became part of the Crown of the Kingdom of Poland within the Polish–Lithuanian Commonwealth.

In the early 16th century, the Starosta of Bratslav and Vinnytsia was Hetman Konstanty Ostrogski, who commanded the Polish–Lithuanian army at the Battle of Orsha. Bratslav and its castle were destroyed during a Crimean Tatar raid in 1497. The castle was rebuilt and reinforced by order of King Alexander Jagiellon, but was destroyed again in 1551 during a raid led by Devlet I Giray.

In 1564, Bratslav was granted Magdeburg rights. Five years later, following the Union of Lublin, it became part of the Kingdom of Poland and the capital of the Bracław Voivodeship. Bracław was a royal town of Poland administered by royal starostas.

In 1570, a special commission of the Polish Sejm established the boundaries of the Bracław Voivodeship. The region extended westward to the Dniester and Murachwa rivers and northward to the so-called Black Tatar Trail. The area's fertile chernozem soils made it an important agricultural region of the Commonwealth. In 1589, the Sejm granted Bratslav a coat of arms consisting of a cross on a red field with a blue shield in the centre. In 1598, the Polish parliament transferred the seat of the local courts and sejmiks from Bracław to Vinnytsia, making the latter the de facto capital of the voivodeship.

On 5 October 1594, Zaporozhian Cossacks under Severyn Nalyvaiko attacked a tabor of local Polish nobles near Bratslav Castle during the Nalyvaiko Uprising. In 1648, during the Khmelnytsky Uprising, Bracław became a Cossack regimental town and the centre of the Bratslav Regiment of the Cossack Hetmanate. Following the Russo-Polish War (1654–1667), it returned to Polish control under the Treaty of Andrusovo.

Between 1672 and 1699, the city was ruled by the Ottoman Empire, after which it returned to Polish control. It became part of the Russian Empire following the Second Partition of Poland in 1793. Under Russian rule, Bratslav became an uezd centre in the Podolia Governorate. Its importance and population gradually declined during the 19th century, in part because it was bypassed by the railway.

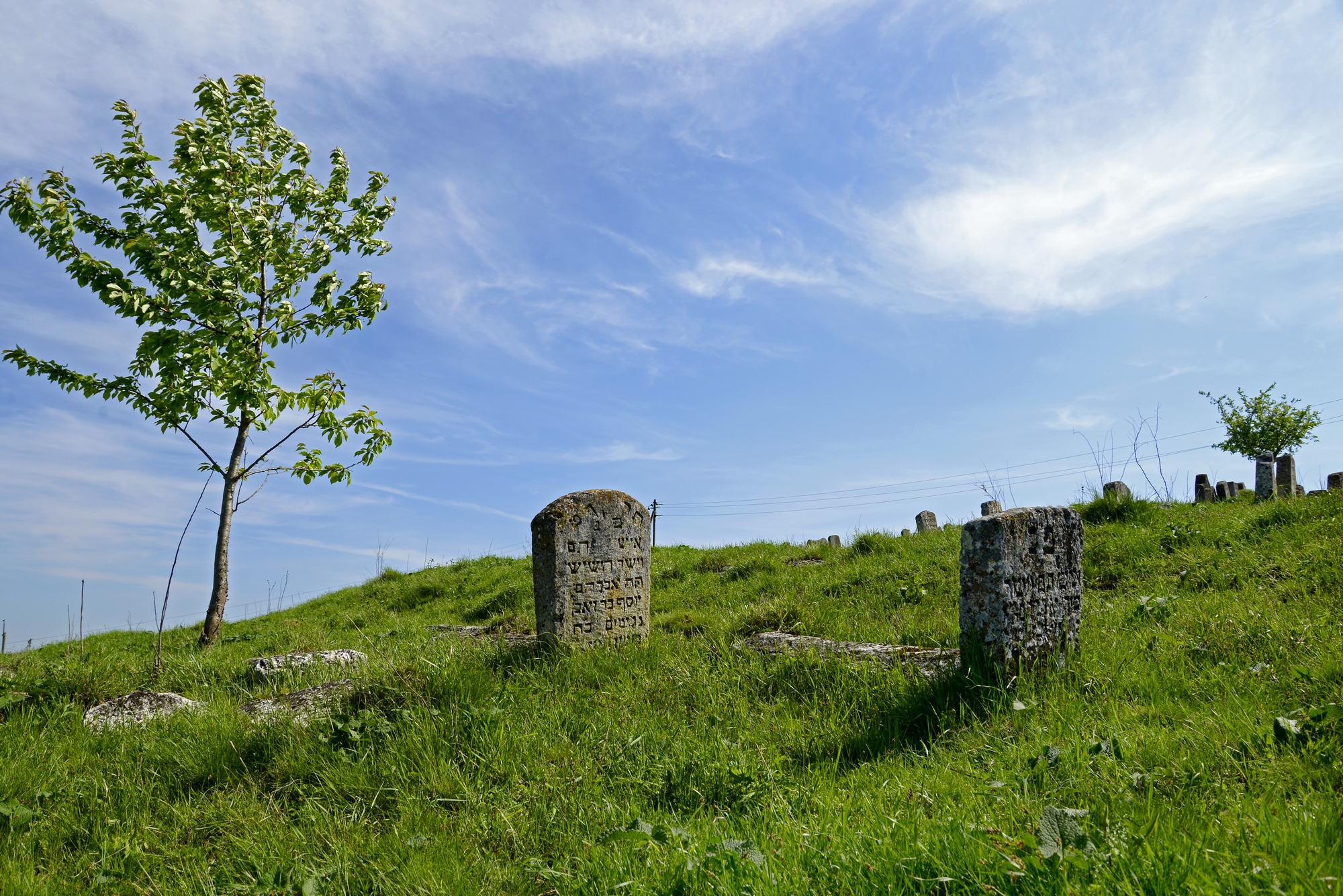
Remnants of the Jewish cemetery in Bratslav. The cemetery contains between 501 and 5,000 gravestones, with the oldest dating to 1648.

Bratslav is significant in the history of Judaism as the town where Rabbi Nachman of Breslov lived and taught from 1802 to 1810. He founded Breslov Hasidism and wrote several works of Jewish mysticism. Following the Russian Revolution, Soviet restrictions increasingly affected Jewish religious life. Rabbi Moishe Yankel Rabinovich served the Jewish community of Bratslav from 1919 until 1968.

In December 1919, Bratslav was the site of fighting between the Zaporozhian Corps and Denikin's Volunteer Army. In 1926, Bratslav had a population of 7,842.

=== World War II and the Holocaust ===
German forces occupied Bratslav on 22 July 1941. In September, the town was incorporated into the Romanian-administered Transnistria Governorate. Romanian authorities brought Jewish deportees from Bessarabia and Bukovina to the area, where they were confined alongside local Jews.

A ghetto was established near the Bratslav prison in September 1941. It held Jews who had remained in the town, deportees from Bessarabia and Bukovina, and Jews from the surrounding district. The inmates were permitted to leave the ghetto once a week to obtain water and buy food at the local market because there was no well within the ghetto. Approximately 750 people were confined there by the end of December 1941. Prisoners were subjected to robbery, mistreatment and forced labour.

During the night of 31 December 1941–1 January 1942, most of the ghetto's inmates were transferred to the Pechora concentration camp, where many subsequently died from starvation, disease, exposure or shootings. Some Jews were retained in Bratslav for road construction. In February 1942, approximately 50 Jews, primarily children and elderly people, were murdered on the bank of the Southern Bug. Further prisoners were transferred to Pechora during the spring of 1942.

In August 1942, two forced-labour camps were established in Bratslav to supply Jewish labour to German construction companies. Their prisoners included Ukrainian Jews, many from Bratslav itself, as well as deportees from Bukovina and Bessarabia. They were employed in quarries and road construction under harsh conditions. Periodic selections and executions took place in the camps, although Jewish labourers remained there through the end of 1943.

A 16-member Jewish underground also operated in Bratslav during the occupation. The group was eventually discovered and its members were executed. Most prisoners in the Bratslav labour camps were murdered in a series of killing operations during 1942 and 1943.

The Red Army recaptured Bratslav on 17 March 1944. At liberation, approximately 200 Ukrainian Jews and between 20 and 30 Jewish deportees from Bukovina and Bessarabia remained alive in the town.

The Bratslav Jewish Cemetery in Ukraine features a shared monument complex dedicated to Holocaust victims, the victims of the 1919–1921 pogroms, and local Ukrainian rescuers recognized as Righteous Among the Nations. The town's small remaining Jewish community maintains a localized Museum of Jewish Life.

Until 26 January 2024, Bratslav was designated an urban-type settlement. On that date, a new law abolishing this status came into force, and Bratslav became a rural settlement.

== Population ==
355 yard (1849), 5,085 (1858), 7,217 (1885), 6,148 (1888), 8,260 (1893), 7,863 (1897), 10,342 (1905), 5,607 (1923), 7,842 (1926), 3,974 (1939), 3,964 (1959), 4,359 (1970), 6,622 (1979), 6,386 (1989), 6,044 (2001), 5,643 (2011), 4,995 (2021)

=== Language ===
Distribution of the population by native language according to the 2001 census:

Language	Percentage
Ukrainian	91.7%
Russian	8.1%
other/undecided	0.2%

== Notable people ==
- Ivan Bohun — Ukrainian Cossack
- Ivan Volosheniuk — Ukrainian writer

== Sources ==
- (in Russian) Елена Цвелик, "Еврейская Атлантида", M-Graphics Publishing, Boston, MA.
