= Gaysin uezd =

Gaysin uezd Гайсинскій уѣздъ
- Uezd
- Coat of arms

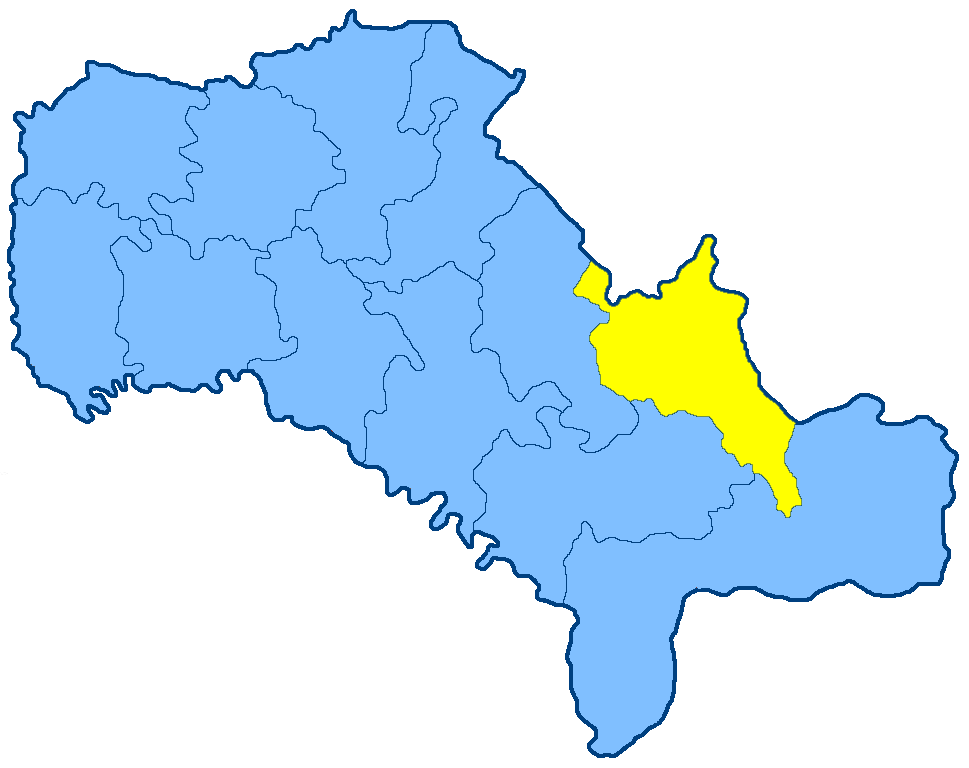
- Location in the Podolia Governorate
- Country: Russian Empire
- Krai: Southwestern
- Governorate: Podolia
- Established: 1795
- Abolished: 1923
- Capital: Gaysin

Area
  - Total: 3,383.11 km^{2} (1,306.23 sq mi)

Population (1897)
  - Total: 248,142
  - Density: 73.3473/km^{2} (189.969/sq mi)
  - Urban: 3.78%
  - Rural: 96.22%

The Gaysin uezd (Note: Russian: Га́йсинскій уѣ́здъ, romanized: Gáysinskiy uyézd; Ukrainian: Га́йсинський пові́т, romanized: Háisynsʼkyi povít) was a county (uezd) of the Podolian Governorate of the Russian Empire, with its administrative centre in Gaysin (modern-day Haisyn). The area of the Gaysin uezd covered the area of modern-day Haisyn Raion.

== Administrative divisions ==
The subcounties (volosts) of the Bratslav uezd in 1912 were as follows:

Name	Name in Russian	Capital
Granov volost	Грановская волость	Granov
Kiblich volost	Кибличская волость	Kiblich
Kislyak volost	Кислякская волость	Kislyak
Krasnaya-Polka volost	Красно-Полкская волость	Krasnaya-Polka
Krasnoselka volost	Красноселкская волость	Krasnoselka
Kuna volost	Кунянская волость	Kuna
Ladyzhino volost	Ладыжинская волость	Ladyzhino
Nizhekrapivna volost	Ниже-Крапивнянская волость	Krapivna
Sobolevka volost	Соболевская волость	Sobolevka
Teplik volost	Тепликская волость	Teplik
Ternov volost	Терновская волость	Ternov
Khashchevata volost	Хащеватская волость	Khashchevata

== Demographics ==
At the time of the Russian Empire Census on 28 January [O.S. 15 January] 1897, the Gaysin uezd had a population of 248,142, including 123,305 men and 124,837 women. The majority of the population indicated Little Russian (Note: Prior to 1918, the Imperial Russian government classified Russians as the Great Russians, Ukrainians as the Little Russians, and Belarusians as the White Russians. After the creation of the Ukrainian People's Republic in 1918, the Little Russians identified themselves as "Ukrainian". Also, the Belarusian Democratic Republic which the White Russians identified themselves as "Belarusian".) to be their mother tongue, with a significant Jewish speaking minority.

Linguistic composition of the Gaysin uezd in 1897
Language	Native speakers	Percentage
Little Russian	214,218	86.33
Jewish	25,733	10.37
Great Russian	4,662	1.88
Polish	3,043	1.23
German	184	0.07
Tatar	121	0.05
Votyak	36	0.01
White Russian	24	0.01
Gipsy	23	0.01
Czech	19	0.01
Romanian	11	0.00
French	10	0.00
Cheremis	6	0.00
Latvian	6	0.00
Bashkir	2	0.00
Chuvash	1	0.00
Other	43	0.02
Total	248,142	100.00
