= Khotinsky Uyezd =

Subdivision of the Bessarabia Governorate of the Russian Empire

Khotinsky County (Russian: Хотинский уезд, romanized: Khotinsky Uyezd) was an uezd, one of the subdivisions of the Bessarabia Governorate of the Russian Empire. It was situated in the northwestern part of the governorate. Its administrative centre was Khotyn (Khotin).

== Demographics ==
At the time of the Russian Empire Census of 1897, Khotinsky Uyezd had a population of 307,532. Of these, 53.2% spoke Ukrainian, 23.8% Moldovan and Romanian, 15.6% Yiddish, 5.8% Russian, 0.7% Polish, 0.5% Belarusian and 0.2% German as their native language.

== See also ==
- Hotin County
