= Podolia Governorate =

1793–1925 administrative unit

Coordinates: 48.6806°N 26.5806°E

- 1793–1925
- Coat of arms

- Location in the Russian Empire
- Capital: Kamenets-Podolsky (until 1914); Vinnitsa (1914–1925)
- Area
  - (1897): 42,017 km^{2} (16,223 sq mi)
- Population
  - (1897): 3,018,299
- History
  - Established: 1793
  - Abolished: 1925
Preceded by
Podolian Voivodeship
Bracław Voivodeship
Bratslav Viceroyalty
Succeeded by
Odessa Governorate
Vinnytsia Okruha
Tulchyn Okruha
Mohyliv Okruha
Kamianets Okruha
Proskuriv Okruha
Haisyn Okruha

Podolia Governorate (Note: Russian: Подо́льская губе́рния, pre-1918: Подо́льская губе́рнія, romanized: Podólʼskaya gubérniya; Ukrainian: Поді́льська губе́рнія, romanized: Podílʼsʼka hubérniia) was an administrative-territorial unit (guberniya) of the Southwestern Krai of the Russian Empire. It bordered Volhynia Governorate to the north, Kiev Governorate to the east, Kherson Governorate to the southeast, Bessarabia Governorate to the south, and Austria to the west. Its administrative centre was Kamenets-Podolsky (Kamianets-Podilskyi), which later moved to Vinnitsa (Vinnytsia). The governorate covered part of Ukraine's Khmelnytskyi Oblast and most of Vinnytsia Oblast, along with the fractionally recognised state of Transnistria.

== Location ==
The Podolia Governorate occupied the southwestern frontier of the former Russian Empire, bordering Austria-Hungary, and had an area of about 42,000 km^{2}. The administrative centre was Kamenets-Podolskiy until 1914 when it moved to Vinnytsia.

Podolia Governorate was one of the three governorates of the Southwestern Krai administration. In 1917 it was recognized by the Russian Provisional Government to be governed by the General Secretariat of Ukraine as the representative of the Russian Provisional Government in the region.

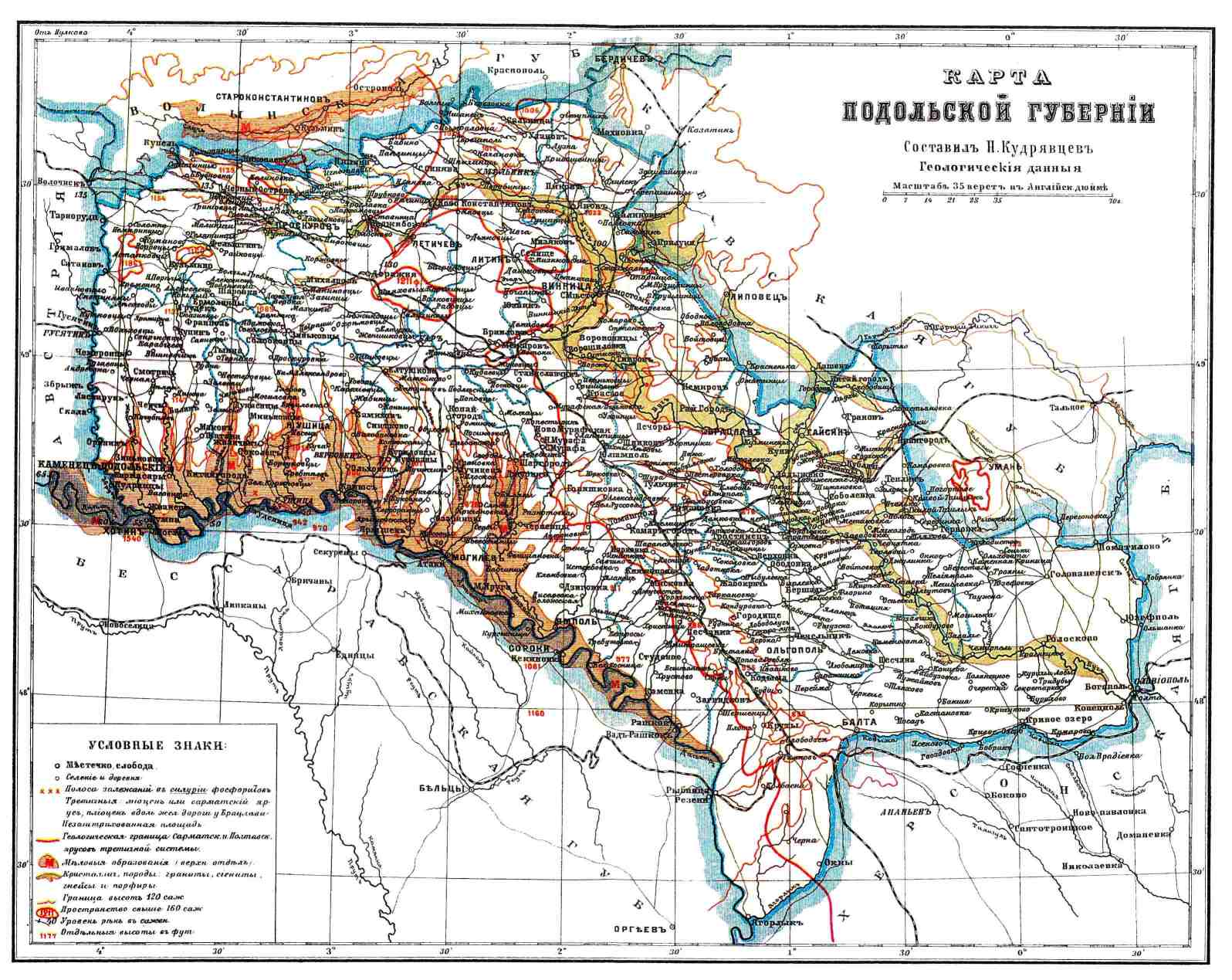
Old map of Podolia Governorate, Russian Empire.

== History ==
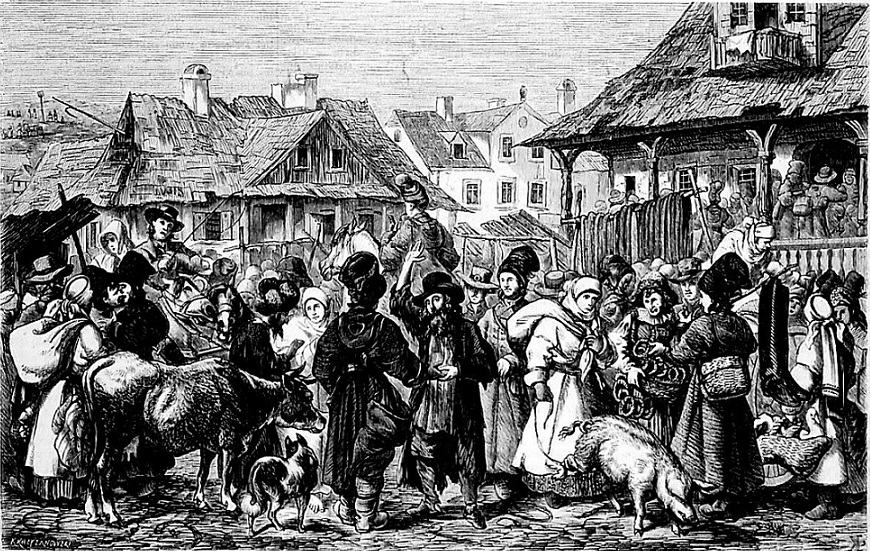
A market scene in Podolia, c. 1864

The Government of Podolia was established right after the Second Partition of Poland in place of the former Podole and Bracław Voivodeships in 1793. The governorate became part of the Southwestern Krai along with Volhynia and Kiev. Its capital was located in Kamenets-Podolsky, and later moved to Vinnitsa.

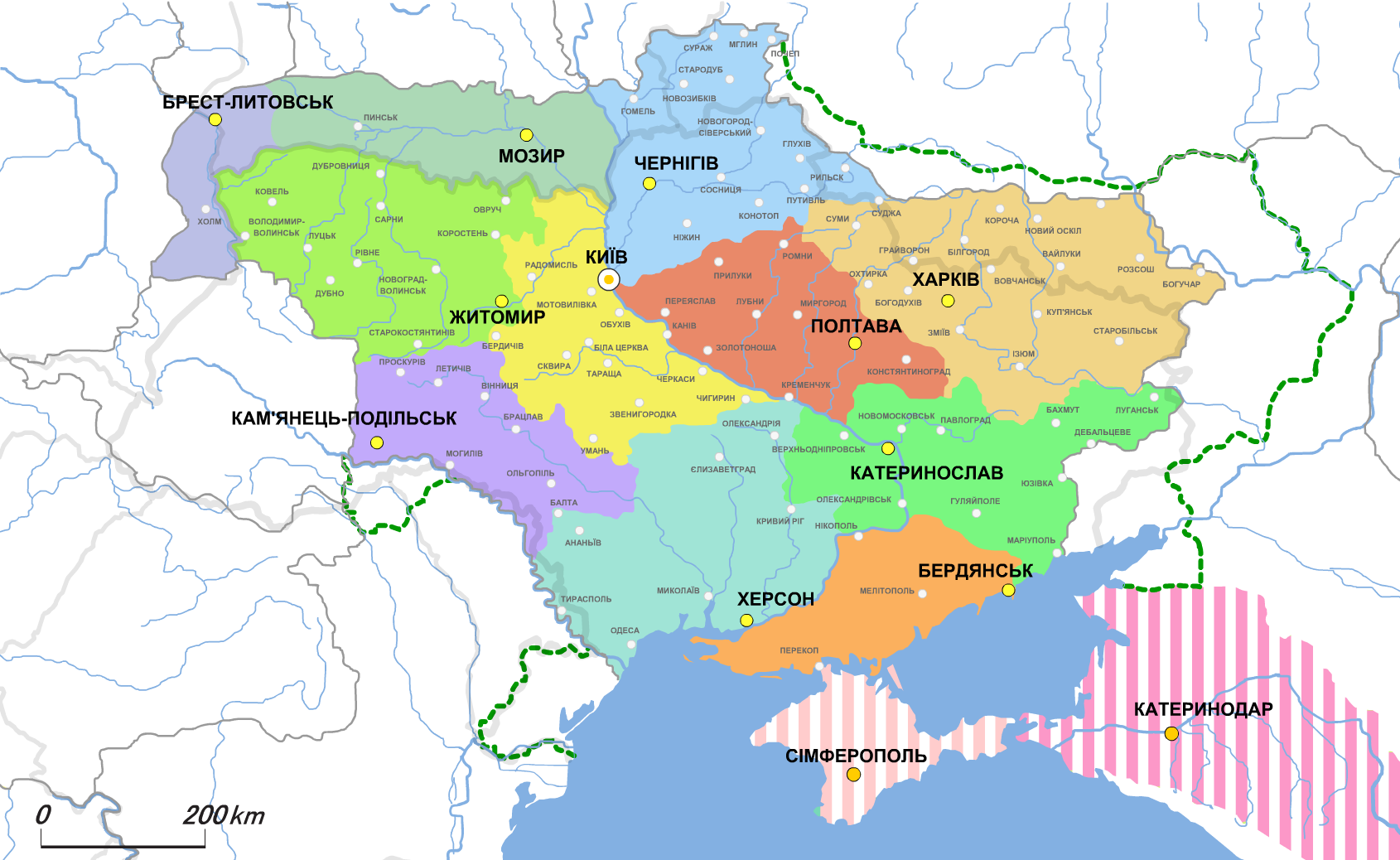
Podolia Governorate (violet) in the Ukrainian State

Under the Russian Provisional Government administrative power in the governorates was transferred to commissars, who preserved their positions after the proclamation of Ukrainian People's Republic in November 1917. Their power was mostly nominal due to the growth of Bolshevik Soviet influence, especially in industrial areas. During that time Mykola Stakhovsky served as the gubernial commissar of Podolia.

After the return of Central Rada in March 1918 new commissars were appointed along with military commandants. After the establishment of the Hetmanate, in May 1918 those were replaced with Governorate starosts. As a result of administrative reforms of the Ukrainian SSR, in 1924-1925 the government was dissolved into five okruhas.

== Administrative division ==
=== Uyezd subdivision ===
Until 1918 the governorate consisted of 12 uyezds (counties):

County		County Town	Arms of County Town	Area	Population (1897 census)
Transliteration name	Russian Cyrillic	County Town	Arms of County Town	Area	Population (1897 census)
Baltsky	Балтский	Balta		7,766.25 km^{2} (2,998.57 mi^{2})	391,018
Bratslavsky	Брацлавский	Bratslav		3,079.93 km^{2} (1,189.17 mi^{2})	241,868
Vinnitsky	Винницкий	Vinnitsa		2,980.92 km^{2} (1,150.94 mi^{2})	248,314
Gaysinsky	Гайсинский	Gaysin		3,383.11 km^{2} (1,306.23 mi^{2})	248,142
Kamenets-Podolsky	Каменец-Подольский	Kamenets-Podolsky		2,884.19 km^{2} (1,113.59 mi^{2})	266,350
Letichevsky	Летичевский	Letichev		2,699.14 km^{2} (1,042.14 mi^{2})	184,477
Litinsky	Литинский	Litin		3,322 km^{2} (1,283 mi^{2})	210,502
Mogilyovsky	Могилёвский	Mogilyov		2,746.14 km^{2} (1,060.29 mi^{2})	227,672
Novoushitsky	Новоушицкий	Novaya Ushitsa		2,840.26 km^{2} (1,096.63 mi^{2})	223,312
Olgopolsky	Ольгопольский	Olgopol		4,008.14 km^{2} (1,547.55 mi^{2})	284,253
Proskurovsky	Проскуровский	Proskurov		2,691.06 km^{2} (1,039.02 mi^{2})	226,091
Yampolsky	Ямпольский	Yampol		3,618.01 km^{2} (1,396.92 mi^{2})	266,300

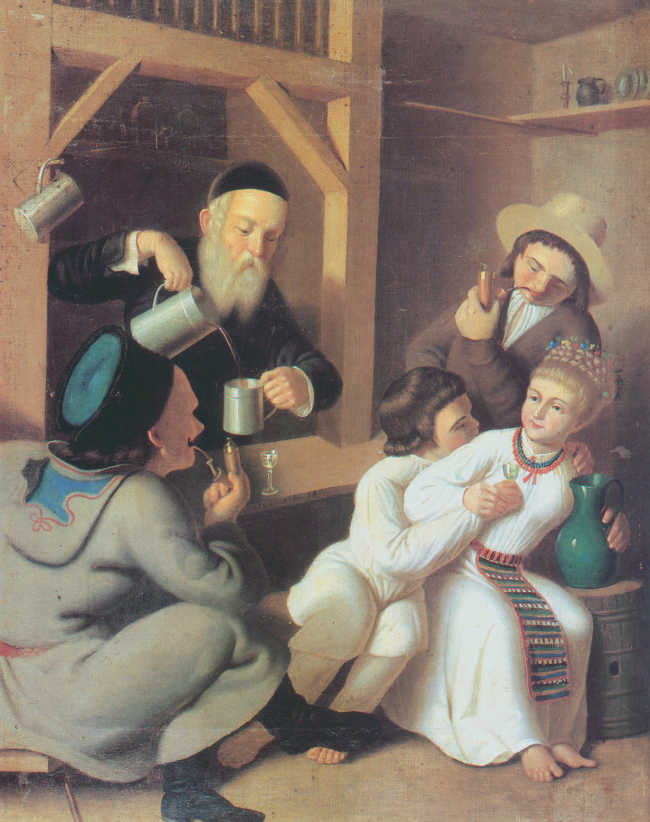
Podolian korchma

=== Okruha subdivision ===
On 12 April 1923 all uyezds (counties) were transformed into okruhas (counties), while volosts (districts) – into raions (districts). Okruhas served as a subdivision of government until it was abolished on 1 August 1925. Together with the government of Podilia, the Haisyn okruha was dissolved as well. Some territory of Tulchyn okruha were included into the newly formed Moldavian Autonomous Soviet Socialist Republic.

- Vinnytsia
- Haisyn
- Kamianets
- Mohyliv
- Proskuriv
- Tulchyn

== Principal cities ==
Russian Census of 1897:

Kamenets/Podolsky

- Kamenets/Podolsky – 35 934 (Jewish – 16 112, Ukrainian – 9 755, Russian – 7 420)
- Vinnitsa – 30 563 (Jewish – 11 456, Ukrainian – 10 862, Russian – 5 206)
- Balta – 23 363 (Jewish – 13 164, Russian – 5 385, Ukrainian – 4 124)
- Proskurov – 22 855 (Jewish – 11 369, Ukrainian – 4 425, Russian – 3 483)
- Mogilev/Dnestr – 22 315 (Jewish – 12 188, Ukrainian – 6 512, Russian – 2 668)
- Zhmerinka – 12 908
- Khmelnik – 11 657 (Jewish – 5 979, Ukrainian – 5 375, Polish – 150)

=== Smaller cities ===
- Bar – 9 982 (Jewish – 5 764, Ukrainian – 3 332, Russian – 485)
- Lityn – 9 420 (Jewish – 3 828, Ukrainian – 3 047, Russian – 2 126)
- Gaysin – 9 374 (Jewish – 4 322, Ukrainian – 3 946, Russian – 884)
- Olgopol – 8 134 (Ukrainian – 4 837, Jewish – 2 465, Russian – 625)
- Bratslav – 7 863 (Jewish – 3 275, Ukrainian – 2 608, Russian – 1 782)
- Letichev – 7 248 (Jewish – 4 105, Ukrainian – 1 719, Polish – 741)
- Yampol – 6 605 (Ukrainian – 3 282, Jewish – 2 819, Russian – 275)
- Novaya Ushytsa – 6 371 (Jewish – 2 214, Russian – 2 120, Ukrainian – 1 836)
- Staraya Ushytsa – 4 176 (Ukrainian – 2 488, Jewish – 1 584, Polish – 57)
- Salnitsa – 3 699 (Ukrainian – 2 758, Jewish – 899, Polish – 19)
- Verbovets – 2 311 (Ukrainian – 1 282, Jewish – 661, Polish – 326)

== Languages ==
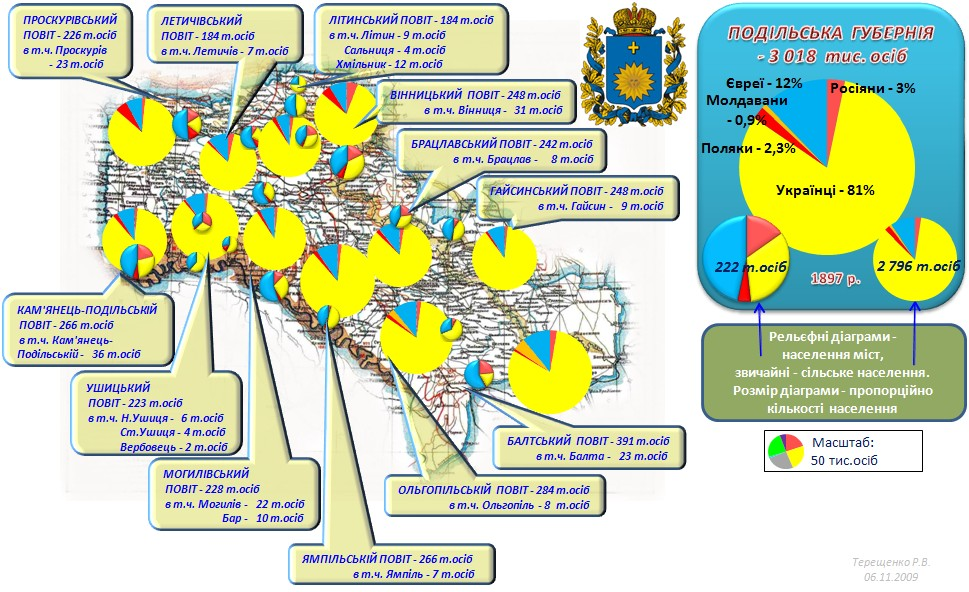
Imperial census of 1897.

According to the Russian Empire Census on 28 January [O.S. 16 January] 1897, the Podolia Governorate had a population of 3,018,299, including 1,505,940 men and 1,512,359 women. The majority of the population indicated Little Russian (Note: Prior to 1918, the Imperial Russian government classified Russians as the Great Russians, Ukrainians as the Little Russians, and Belarusians as the White Russians. After the creation of the Ukrainian People's Republic in 1918, the Little Russians identified themselves as "Ukrainian". Also, the Belarusian Democratic Republic which the White Russians identified themselves as "Belarusian".) to be their mother tongue, with a significant Jewish speaking minority.

Linguistic composition of the Podolia Governorate in 1897
Language	Native speakers	Percentage
Little Russian	2,442,819	80.93
Jewish	369,306	12.24
Great Russian	98,984	3.28
Polish	69,156	2.29
Romanian	26,764	0.89
German	4,069	0.13
Tatar	2,296	0.08
Bashkir	1,113	0.04
Czech	886	0.03
White Russian	834	0.03
Roma	510	0.02
Votyak	254	0.01
French	245	0.01
Chuvash	137	0.00
Mordovian	136	0.00
Latvian	112	0.00
Cheremis	101	0.00
Other languages	577	0.02
TOTAL	3,018,299	100.00

Religious composition of the Podolia Governorate in 1897
Faith	Male	Female	Both	
Faith	Male	Female	Number	Percentage
Eastern Orthodox	1,180,148	1,178,349	2,358,497	78.14
Judaism	179,612	191,000	370,612	12.28
Roman Catholic	131,145	131,593	262,738	8.70
Old Believer	9,357	9,492	18,849	0.62
Lutheran	2,020	1,795	3,815	0.13
Islam	3,427	33	3,460	0.11
Armenian Apostolic	65	29	94	0.00
Reformed	30	26	56	0.00
Armenian Catholic	23	14	37	0.00
Karaite	11	13	24	0.00
Anglican	3	4	7	0.00
Mennonite	2	1	3	0.00
Baptist	1	1	2	0.00
Other Christian denomination	12	9	21	0.00
Other non-Christian denomination	84	0	84	0.00
Total	1,505,940	1,512,359	3,018,299	100.00

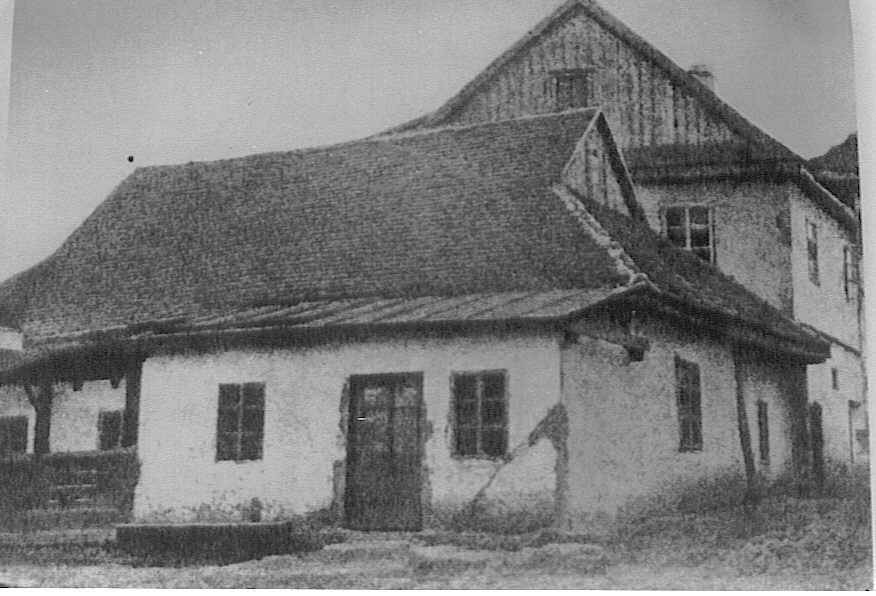
The Baal Shem Tov's shul in Medzhybizh, Ukraine (c. 1915). The shul no longer exists.

Religious structures

- Churches
  - Eastern Orthodox 1645
  - Roman Catholic (kosciol) 202
  - Lutheran 4
- Monasteries
  - Eastern Orthodox 7 (male), 4 (female)
- Synagogues 89
  - other Shul(s) 438
- Mosque(s) 1

== See also ==
- Podolia
