= List of krais of the Russian Empire =

The Russian Empire at various times included the subdivisions known as krais, either formally or informally. Krais of Russian Empire include:

- Baltic Krai (Ostsee Krai) three governorates by the Baltic Sea
- Caucasus Krai
- Turkestan Krai, in Central Asia
- Priamursky Krai (Priamurye Krai), areas around Amur
- Privislinsky Krai (Vistula Krai), area by Vistula
- Uryankhay Krai

Orenburg Krai Ussuri Krai, by Ussuri

- Western Krai
  - Northwestern Krai
  - Southwestern Krai

== See also ==
- Krais of modern Russia
