= Volost =

Eastern European administrative subdivision

Volost (Belarusian: во́ласць, romanized: volasts; Lithuanian: valsčius; Russian: во́лость [ˈvoɫəsʲtʲ]; Ukrainian: во́лость) was a traditional administrative subdivision in Kievan Rus', the Grand Duchy of Moscow, and the Russian Empire. It was also briefly used in modern Russia.

== History ==
The Brockhaus and Efron Encyclopedic Dictionary (1890–1907) states that the origins of the concept is unclear; whether it originally referred to an administrative subdivision or to a peasant obshchina, the term referring to a territory under a single rule.

In earlier East Slavic history, in the lands of Ruthenia, volost was a name for the territory ruled by the knyaz, a principality; either as an absolute ruler or with varying degree of autonomy from the Velikiy Knyaz (Grand Prince). Starting from the end of the 14th century, volost was a unit of administrative division in the Grand Duchy of Lithuania, Poland, Muscovy, lands of modern Latvia and Ukraine. Since about the 16th century it was a part of provincial districts that were called "uezd" in Muscovy and the later Russian Empire. Each uezd had several volosts that were subordinated to the uezd city.

After the abolition of Russian serfdom in 1861, volost became a unit of peasant's local self-rule. A number of mirs are united into a volost, which has an assembly consisting of elected delegates from the mirs. These elect an elder (starshina) and, hitherto, a court of justice (volostnoy sud). The self-government of the mirs and volosts was, however, tempered by the authority of the police commissaries (stanovoi) and by the power of general oversight given to the nominated "district committees for the affairs of the peasants".

Volosts were abolished by the Soviet administrative reform of 1923–1929. Raions may be roughly called a modern equivalent of both volosts and uezds.

== Administration ==
Volosts were governed by volost administration (волостное правление, volostnoye pravleniye), which consisted of the electable chief of volost (volostnoy starshina), chiefs of villages (village starostas) and other officials electable by the Volost Assembly (волостной сход, volostnoy skhod).

Volost Court was the court electable by the Volost Assembly, which could handle smaller civil and criminal cases. It could sentence people to corporal punishment, fine or short-term incarceration.

== Russian Federation ==
In post-Soviet Russia, the Veps National Volost existed within the Republic of Karelia between 1996 and 2004. There were also volosts in the Olonets Raion of Karelia between 1993 and 2004 such as the Nurmolskaya Volost (Нурмольская волость), formed in 1992 from the previous Nurmolsky selsoviet (Нурмольский сельсовет) based in Nurmolitsy. There was also the Kotkozero Volost and the Vidlitsa Volost.
