= Southwestern Krai =

Subdivision of the Russian Empire (1832–1914)

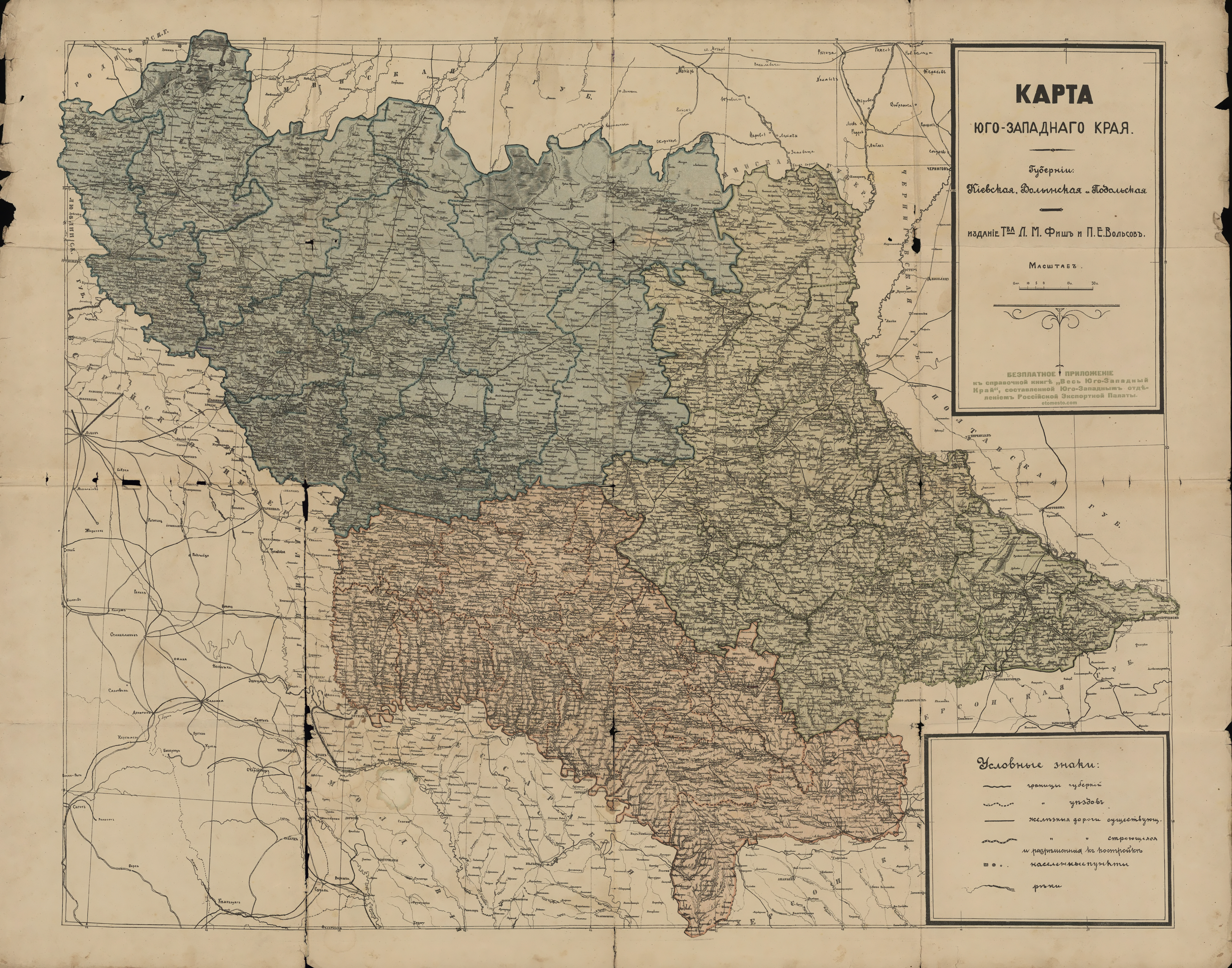
The 1913 map of the Russian Southwest

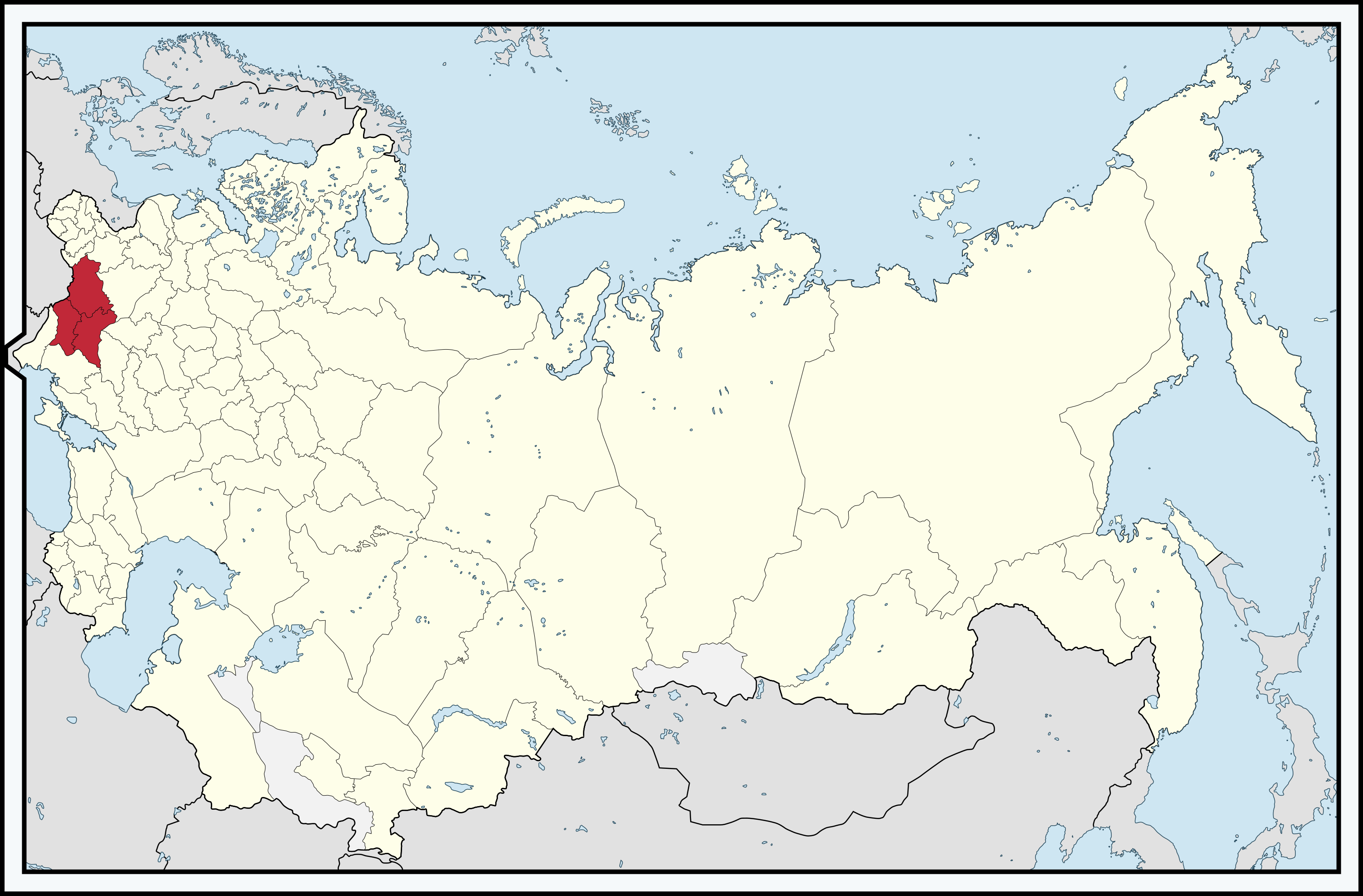
Location in the Russian Empire

Southwestern Krai (Russian: Юго-западный край, romanized: Yugo-zapadny kray), also known as Kiev Governorate-General or Kiev, Podolia, and Volhynia Governorate-General (Russian: Киевское, Подольское и Волынское генерал-губернаторство, romanized: Kievskoye, Podol'skoye i Volynskoye general-gubernatorstvo) was an administrative-territorial and political subdivision (a krai) of the Russian Empire in 1832–1914. It had a special status established for the gradual political and economical integration and assimilation of the non-Russian (Ukrainian, Jewish, Polish, Tatar) population of right-bank Ukraine within the Russian Empire.

== History ==
The Southwestern Krai or the Governor General of Kiev, Podolia and Volhynia consisting of three gubernias, the Volhynia, the Podolia and the Kiev Governorate, was supposedly incepted on January 22, 1832 when Vasily Levashov, was appointed the Military Governor of Kiev and the General Governor of Podolia and Volhynia. However a position of Kiev Military Governor existed since 1796.

Separately there existed the Governor General of Little Russia and the Governor General of New Russia and Bessarabia.

From 1881 the territory of the Governorate General was de facto expanded to five Gubernias as Governor General Alexander Drenteln was also appointed the temporary Governor General of Chernigov and Poltava governorates (former governorates of the Governor General of Little Russia).

In 1889 the Governorate General original jurisdiction of only three gubernias was restored. It existed in this form until 1915 when the territorial unit was abolished. Fyodor Trepov was the last General Governor of Kiev.

In 1913 the Kholm Governorate, a former governorate of the Congress Poland, was detached from it, and attached to the Kiev General Governorate.

== List of general governors and military governors ==
- November 18, 1796 - November 29, 1797 Count Ivan Saltykov
- November 30, 1797 - March 12, 1798 Didrich Arend Rosenberg
- March 1798 - June 1798 Ivan Gudovich
- June 13, 1798 - 1799 Aleksandr Bekleshov
- 1801 - 1803 Andrei Fensh
- 1803 - 1806 Alexander Tormasov
- September 28, 1806 - July 3, 1809 Mikhail Kutuzov
- 1810 - August 1818 Mikhail Miloradovich
- 1827 - 1829 Peter Zheltukhin
- 1829 - January 22, 1832 Boris Knyazhnin
- January 22, 1832 - June 9, 1835 Count Vasiliy Levashov
- June 9, 1835 - November 15, 1837 Count Aleksandr Guryev
- December 29, 1837 - August 30, 1852 Dmitriy Bibikov
- August 30, 1852 - November 12, 1862 Prince Illarion Vasilchikov
- January 19, 1863 - January 19, 1865 Nicholas Annenkov
- January 19, 1865 - January 16, 1869 Aleksandr Bezak
- January 16, 1869 - April 16, 1878 Prince Aleksandr Dondukov-Korsakov
- April 16, 1878 - January 13, 1881 Mikhail Chertkov
- January 13, 1881 - July 15, 1888 Alexander Drenteln
- August 12, 1889 - December 7, 1897 Count Aleksei Ignatiev
- January 1, 1898 - December 24, 1903 Mikhail Dragomirov
- December 24, 1903 - October 19, 1905 Nicholas Kleigels
- October 19, 1905 - December 18, 1908 Vladimir Sukhomlinov
- December 18, 1908 - 1914 Fyodor Trepov

== See also ==
- Northwestern Krai
- Western Krai
- November Uprising
- Palace of Governor-General in Kyiv
