= Brześć District =

Administrative district of the Second Polish Republic

Brześć District Okręg brzeski (Polish)
- District of Civil Administration of the Eastern Lands and Provisional Administration of Front-line and Phase Territories
- 1919–1920
- Location within the Civil Administration of the Eastern Lands
- Capital: Brest-Litovsk
- Area
  - 1919: 57,758 km^{2} (22,300 sq mi)
- Population
  - 1919: 1 121 978
- Government
- Chief of District
  - 1919: Maciej Jamont
  - 1919–1920: Władysław Jeśman
- History
  - Formation of Brześć District: 7 June 1919
  - Incorporation into Provisional Administration of Front-line and Phase Territories: 9 September 1920
  - Incorporation into Second Polish Republic: 20 December 1920
- Contained within
  - Civil administration: Civil Administration of the Eastern Lands (June 1919 – September 1920); Provisional Administration of Front-line and Phase Territories (September 1920 – December 1920)
- Political subdivisions: 6 counties (until August 1919); 7 counties (August – November 1919); 8 counties (since November 1919)
Preceded by
| Lithuanian–Byelorussian SSR |
Succeeded by
| Byelorussian SSR |
| Nowogródek District |
| Polesian District |

Brześć District (Polish: Okręg brzeski) was a district of the Civil Administration of the Eastern Lands from June 1919 to September 1920, and Provisional Administration of Front-line and Phase Territories from September 1920 to December 1920, all of which were under the control of the Second Polish Republic. Its seat was located in Brest-Litovsk. In December 1919, it had an area of 57,758 km^{2} (22,300 sq mi), and was inhabited by 1,121,978 people.

It was established on 7 June 1919 with the formation of Civil Administration of the Eastern Lands, from the lands conquered from the Socialist Soviet Republic of Lithuania and Belorussia. On 17 January 1920, it was incorporated into Provisional Administration of Front-line and Phase Territories. On 20 December 1920, the civil administration was disestablished and the district was incorporated into Nowogródek and Polesian Districts.

== History ==
It was established on 7 June 1919 with the formation of Civil Administration of the Lands of Volhynia and Podolian Front, from the lands conquered from the Socialist Soviet Republic of Lithuania and Belorussia. It was formed as a district of the civil administration under the control of Second Polish Republic, of the lands conquered by it during the Polish–Soviet War. Its seat was located Brest-Litovsk. The region was governed by the Chief of District. The first person in that office was Maciej Jamont, and the second one was Władysław Jeśman, who assumed the office on 8 November 1919.

It consisted of the counties of Brześć Litewski, Wołkowysk, Prużana, Słonim, Kobryń and Pińsk.

On 1 August 1919, part of Nowogródek County, Wilno District and Słuck County, Mińsk Districtand were reformed into Baranowicze County that was incorporated into Brześć District. On 6 November 1919, to the district was incorporated Mozyrz County, with provisional seat located in Zhytkavichy. On 10 April 1920, to the Mozyrz County was temporarily added part of Rechitsky Uyezd.

On 9 September 1920, the district was incorporated into, then formed, Provisional Administration of Front-line and Phase Territories. On 20 December 1920, the civil administration was disestablished and the district was incorporated into Nowogródek and Polesian Districts.

== Demography ==
In December 1919, the district was inhabited by 1 121 978 people, and had an area of 57 758 km^{2} (293 sq mi), having the population density of 19.4 people/km^{2} (50 people/sq mi). The biggest cities were: Pińsk with 21 436 inhabitants, Brześć Litewski with 14 005, and Baranowicze with 10 373. The territory included 5544 other settlements, from which 10 had populations between 5 and 10 thousand and 43, between 1 and 5 thousand.

== Education ==
In the school year of 1919/1920, the district had 347 primary schools, 18 middle schools, 14 vocational schools, 2 teacher seminars and 1 course. To all schools had attended 28 427 students and taught 727 teachers. In March 1920, there were 349 schools that taught in Polish language and 379 that taught in others.

== Subdivisions ==
=== Counties ===
- Baranowicze County (from 1 August 1919)
- Brześć Litewski County
- Kobryń County
- Mozyrz County (from 6 November 1919)
- Pińsk County
- Prużana County
- Słonim County
- Wołkowysk County

== Leaders ==
=== Chiefs of District ===
- Maciej Jamont
- Władysław Jeśman (from 8 November 1919)
