= Chief of district =

Chief of district (Note: Polish: Naczelnik okręgu) was a public official in Second Polish Republic with the power to govern the districts. He was a representative of the Council of Ministers, responsible for the implementation of the laws as well as superior to local administration offices.

The function of chief of district existed within the districts of the civil administrations of Poland, that existed between 1919 and 1920, during the Polish–Soviet War. Said administrations were Civil Administration of the Eastern Lands, Civil Administration of the Lands of Volhynia and Podolian Front and Provisional Administration of Front-line and Phase Territories, and districts formed within them were: Brześć, Mińsk, Wilno, Volhynian and Podolian. Later the function had existed within the districts of Poland between 1920 and 1921. Such districts were: Nowogródek, Polesian and Volhynian

== See also ==
- Voivode

== Bibliography ==
- Joanna Gierowska-Kałłaur, Zarząd cywilny ziem wschodnich. Warsaw. 2003.
