= Volhynian District (1919–1920) =

Administrative district of the Second Polish Republic

Volhynian District Okręg wołyński (Polish)
- District of Civil Administration of the Eastern Lands, Civil Administration of the Lands of Volhynia and Podolian Front and Provisional Administration of Front-line and Phase Territories
- 1919–1920
- Location within Civil Administration of the Lands of Volhynia and Podolian Front
- Capital: Kovel (1919); Lutsk (1919–1920)
- History
  - Formation of Administration of the Volhynian Counties: 7 June 1919
  - Formation of Volhynian District: 9 September 1919
  - Incorporation into Civil Administration of the Lands of Volhynia and Podolian Front: 17 January 1920
  - Incorporation into Provisional Administration of Front-line and Phase Territories: 9 September 1920
  - Incorporation into Volhynian District, Poland: 20 December 1920
- Contained within
  - Civil administration: Civil Administration of the Eastern Lands (September 1919 – January 1920); Civil Administration of the Lands of Volhynia and Podolian Front (January 1920 – September 1920); Provisional Administration of Front-line and Phase Territories (September 1920 – December 1920)
- Political subdivisions: From 9 to 11 counties
Preceded by	Succeeded by
Administration of the Volhynian Counties; Ukrainian Soviet Socialist Republic	Volhynian District; Polesian District

Volhynian District (Note: Polish: Okręg wołyński) was a district of the Civil Administration of the Eastern Lands from September 1919 to January 1920, Civil Administration of the Lands of Volhynia and Podolian Front from January 1920 to September 1920 and Provisional Administration of Front-line and Phase Territories from September 1920 to December 1920, all of which were under the control of the Second Polish Republic. Its seat was located in Lutsk, and before that, its provisional seat was in Kovel.

It was established on 9 September 1919 and formed from Administration of the Volhynian Counties and territories conquered from the Ukrainian Soviet Socialist Republic, and existed within the Civil Administration of the Eastern Lands. On 17 January 1920, it was incorporated into the Civil Administration of the Lands of Volhynia and Podolian Front, and on 9 September 1920, to the Provisional Administration of Front-line and Phase Territories. On 20 December 1920, the civil administration was disestablished and the district was incorporated mostly into, Volhynian District, Poland, with the exception of Koszyrski County that was incorporated into Polesian District, Poland.

== History ==
It was established on 9 September 1919 and formed from the Administration of the Volhynian Counties and territories conquered from the Ukrainian Soviet Socialist Republic, and existed within the Civil Administration of the Eastern Lands. It was formed as a district of the civil administration under the control of Second Polish Republic, of the lands conquered by it during the Polish–Soviet War. Its provisional seat was located in Kovel. The region was governed by the Chief of District.

From the Administration of the Volhynian Counties it incorporated the counties of Kowel, Łuck and Włodzimierz. Additionally it incorporated counties of: Dubno, Równe, Krzemieniec, Ostróg, Zwiahel, Zasław.

On 20 November 1919, its seat was moved from Kovel to Lutsk. On 17 January 1920, it was incorporated into the Civil Administration of the Lands of Volhynia and Podolian Front.

On 15 March 1920, was established Sarny County, that was formed from the municipalities of Równe County: Wysock, Dąbrowica, Lubikowicze, Niemowicze, Wiry as well as three newly added municipalities: Kisorycze, Olewsk and Jurowo. On 15 May 1920, Starokonstantynów County was transferred from Volhynian to Podolian District.

On 1 June 1920, counties: Włodzimierz, Kowel, Łuck, Dubno, Równe as well as part of Ostróg incorporated into Równe and northwest part of Krzemieniec were transferred under the direct rule of Poland.

On 9 September 1920, to the Provisional Administration of Front-line and Phase Territories. On 12 December 1920, the northern part of Kowel County was reformed into Koszyrski County.

On 20 December 1920, the civil administration was disestablished and the district was incorporated mostly into, Volhynian District, Poland, with the exception of Koszyrski County that was incorporated into Polesian District, Poland.

== Subdivision ==
=== Counties ===
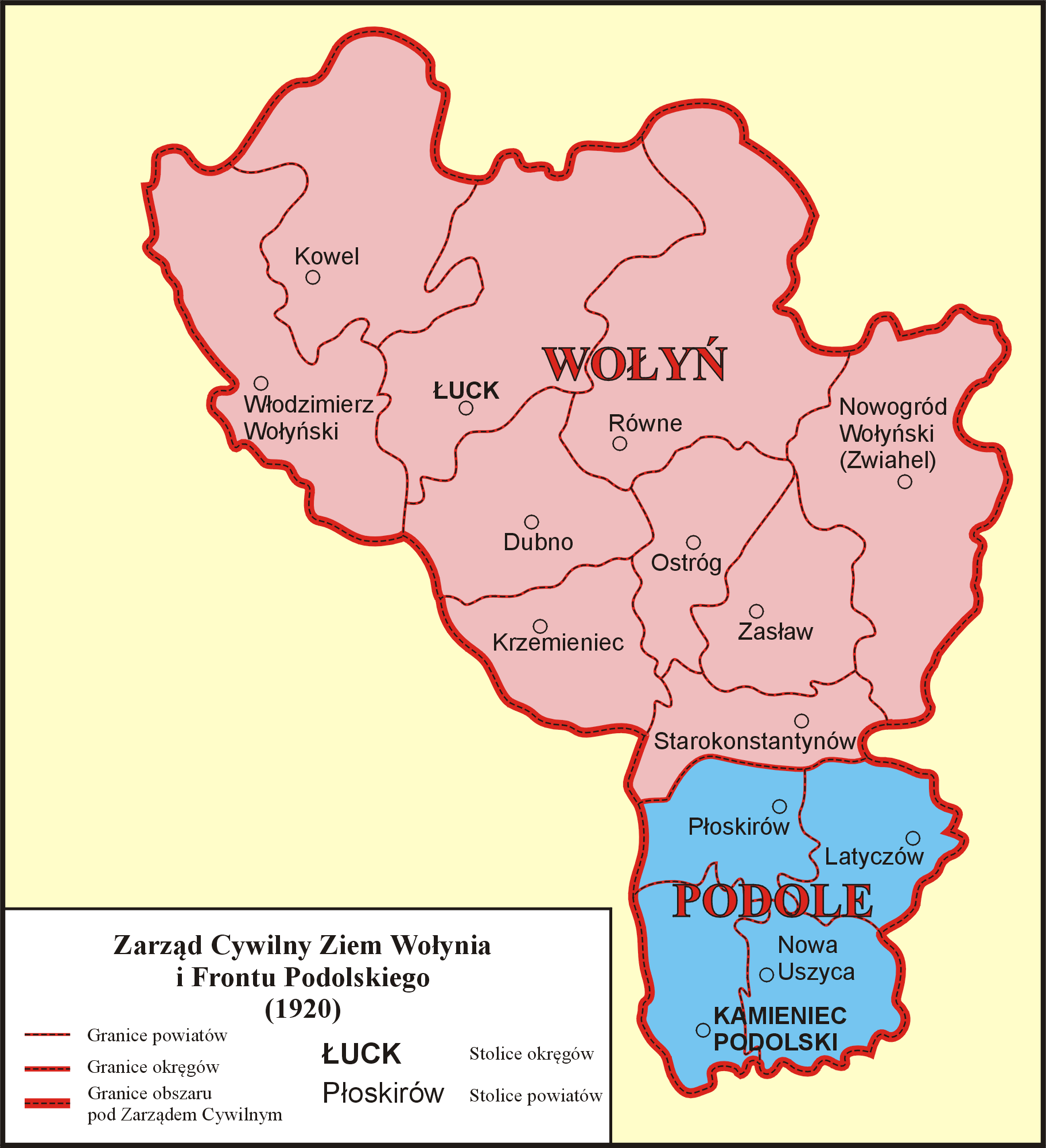
Map of counties of Civil Administration of the Lands of Volhynia and Podolian Front.

- Dubno County
- Koszyrski County (from 12 December 1920)
- Kowel County
- Krzemieniec County
- Łuck County
- Ostróg County
- Owrucz (after 9 September 1919)
- Równe County
- Sarny County (from 15 March 1920)
- Starokonstantynów County (after 9 September 1919, until 15 May 1920)
- Włodzimierz County
- Zwiahel County
- Zasław County
