= Volhynian Counties Administration =

Division of the Second Polish Republic

Volhynian Counties Administration Zarząd Powiatów Wołyńskich (Polish)
- Administrative division of the Civil Administration of the Eastern Lands
- 1919
- Capital: Kowel
- History
  - Established: 7 June 1919
  - Incorporation into Volhynian District: 9 September 1919
- Contained within
  - Civil administration: Civil Administration of the Eastern Lands
- Political subdivisions: 3 counties
Preceded by	Succeeded by
Ukrainian Soviet Socialist Republic	Volhynian District

The Volhynian Counties Administration (Note: Polish: Zarząd Powiatów Wołyńskich; Ukrainian: Управління повітів Волині) was a provisional administrative division of the Civil Administration of the Eastern Lands controlled by the Second Polish Republic, that existed from 7 June 1919 to 9 September 1919. Its seat was located in Kowel.

== History ==
The Volhynian Counties Administration was a provisional administrative division, acting as a district of the Civil Administration of the Eastern Lands controlled by the Second Polish Republic. It was established on 7 June 1919, from the area of the Ukrainian SSR, that was occupied by Poland during the Polish–Soviet War. Its seat was located in the town of Kowel (now Kovel, Ukraine), and its area was divided into three counties, which were: Kowel, Łuck, and Włodzimierz. It was incorporated into then-established Volhynian District on 9 September 1919.

== Subdivisions ==
It was divided into counties. Those were:

- Kowel County (seat: Kovel);
- Łuck County (seat: Lutsk);
- Włodzimierz County (seat: Volodymyr).
