= Wilno District =

Administrative district of the Second Polish Republic

Wilno District Okręg wileński (Polish)
- District of Civil Administration of the Eastern Lands and Provisional Administration of Front-line and Phase Territories
- 1919–1920
- Location within the Civil Administration of the Eastern Lands
- Capital: Minsk
- Area
  - 1919: 48,466 km^{2} (18,713 sq mi)
- Population
  - 1919: 1,633,504
- History
  - Formation of 7 June: 15 September 1919
  - Incorporation into Provisional Administration of Front-line and Phase Territories: 9 September 1920
  - Incorporation into Second Polish Republic: 20 December 1920
- Contained within
  - Civil administration: Civil Administration of the Eastern Lands (September 1919 – September 1920; Provisional Administration of Front-line and Phase Territories (September 1920 – December 1920)
- Political subdivisions: counties
Preceded by	Succeeded by
Lithuanian–Byelorussian SSR	Lithuania; Nowogródek District

Wilno District (Note: Polish: Okręg wileński) was a district of the Civil Administration of the Eastern Lands from June 1919 to September 1920, and Provisional Administration of Front-line and Phase Territories from September 1920 to December 1920, all of which were under the control of the Second Polish Republic. Its seat was located in Vilnius. In December 1919, it had an area of 48,466 km^{2} (18,713 sq mi), and was inhabited by 1,633,504 people.

It was established on 7 June 1919 from the lands conquered from the Socialist Soviet Republic of Lithuania and Belorussia by Poland. On 17 January 1920, it was incorporated into Provisional Administration of Front-line and Phase Territories. On 20 December 1920, the civil administration was disestablished and the district was divided between Nowogródek District, Second Polish Republic and Lithuania.

== History ==
It was established on 7 June 1919 with the formation of Civil Administration of the Lands of Volhynia and Podolian Front, from the lands conquered from the Socialist Soviet Republic of Lithuania and Belorussia. It was formed as a district of the civil administration under the control of Second Polish Republic, of the lands conquered by it during the Polish–Soviet War. Its seat was located in Vilnius. The region was governed by the Chief of District.

It consisted of the counties of Wilno, Troki, Oszmiana, Święciany, Lida, Grodno and Nowogródek.

Between July and September 1919 was formed Wilejka County. 31 October 1919, Brasław County was incorporated into the district. On 6 November 1919, Dzisna County was formed, with provisional seat in Hlybokaye.

On 1 August 1919, from the part of Nowogródek County was formed Baranowicze County that was incorporated into Brześć District.

On 9 September 1920, the district was incorporated into, then formed, Provisional Administration of Front-line and Phase Territories. On 20 December 1920, the civil administration was disestablished and lands of the district were divided between Nowogródek District, Second Polish Republic and Lithuania.

== Demography ==
In December 1919, the district was inhabited by 1,633,504 people, and had an area of 48,466 km^{2} (18,713 sq mi), having the population density of 33.7 people per square kilometre (87 people/sq mi). The biggest cities were: Vilnius with 128,954 inhabitants, Grodno with 28,165, and Lida with 11,365 . The territory also included 23,497 other settlements, from which 3 had population between 5 and 10 thousand people, and 48, between 1 and 5 thousand.

== Education ==
In the school year of 1919/1920, the district had 929 primary schools, 26 middle schools, 13 vocational schools, 4 teacher seminars and 56 courses. To all schools had attended 80,481 students and had taught 2173 teachers. In March 1920, there were 859 schools that taught in Polish language and 968 that taught in others.

== Subdivisions ==
=== Counties ===
- Brasław County
- Grodno County
- Lida County
- Oszmiana County
- Nowogródek County
- Święciany County
- Troki County
- Wilejka County
- Wilno County
