= Mińsk District (1919–1920) =

Administrative district of the Second Polish Republic

Mińsk District Okręg miński (Polish)
- District of Civil Administration of the Eastern Lands and Provisional Administration of Front-line and Phase Territories
- 1919–1920
- Location within the Civil Administration of the Eastern Lands
- Capital: Minsk
- Area
  - 1919: 35,947 km^{2} (13,879 sq mi)
- Population
  - 1919: 1,091,138
- History
  - Formation of Brześć District: 15 September 1919
  - Incorporation into Provisional Administration of Front-line and Phase Territories: 9 September 1920
  - Incorporation into Second Polish Republic: 20 December 1920
- Contained within
  - Civil administration: Civil Administration of the Eastern Lands (September 1919 – September 1920; Provisional Administration of Front-line and Phase Territories (September 1920 – December 1920)
- Political subdivisions: From 5 to 8 counties
Preceded by	Succeeded by
Lithuanian–Byelorussian SSR	Byelorussian SSR; Nowogródek District

Mińsk District (Note: Polish: Okręg miński) was a district of the Civil Administration of the Eastern Lands from September 1919 to September 1920, and Provisional Administration of Front-line and Phase Territories from September 1920 to December 1920, all of which were under the control of the Second Polish Republic. Its seat was located in Minsk. In December 1919, it had an area of 35,947 km^{2} (13,879 sq mi), and was inhabited by 1 091 138 people.

It was established on 15 September 1919 from the lands conquered from the Socialist Soviet Republic of Lithuania and Belorussia by Poland. On 17 January 1920, it was incorporated into Provisional Administration of Front-line and Phase Territories. On 20 December 1920, the civil administration was disestablished and the district was divided between Nowogródek District, Second Polish Republic and Byelorussian SSR.

== History ==
It was established on 15 September 1919 with the formation of Civil Administration of the Lands of Volhynia and Podolian Front, from the lands conquered from the Socialist Soviet Republic of Lithuania and Belorussia. It was formed as a district of the civil administration under the control of Second Polish Republic, of the lands conquered by it during the Polish–Soviet War. Its seat was located in Minsk. The region was governed by the Chief of District.

It consisted of the counties of Bobrujsk, Borysów, Ihumeń, Mińsk and Słuck.

On 9 September 1920, the district was incorporated into, then formed, Provisional Administration of Front-line and Phase Territories. On the same day, from Lepelsky and Polotsky Uyezds was formed Lepel County. On 25 October 1920, city of Minsk was separated from Mińsk County forming a separate county. On 12 December 1920 was formed Stołpce County.

On 20 December 1920, the civil administration was disestablished and lands of the district were divided between Second Polish Republic and Byelorussian SSR, with Poland incorporating Stołpce County into Nowogródek District.

== Demography ==
In December 1919, the district was inhabited by 1,091,138 people, and had an area of 35,947 km^{2} (13,879 sq mi), having the population density of 30.4 people/km^{2} (78.7 people}/mi^{2}). The biggest cities were: Minsk with 102 392 inhabitants, Babruysk with 29 704, and Slutsk with 14 162. The territory included 8,781 other settlements, from which 1 had population between 5 and 10 thousand people and 31, between 1 and 5 thousand. Out of the peoplulation 64.5% identified themselves as Belarusian, 14.6% as Polish, 11.3% as Jewish, 3.5% as Locals, 0.2% as Lithuanian and 5.9% as others, mainly Russians.

== Education ==
In the school year of 1919/1920, the district had 1123 primary schools, 71 middle schools and 14 vocational schools. To all schools had attended 84 690 students and had taught 2454 teachers. In March 1920, there were 279 schools that taught in Polish language and 1,208 that taught in others. Among the middle schools, there were 643 teachings in the Russian language with 42,541 students and 906 teachers, 262 in the Polish language with 13,106 students and 348 teachers, 194 in the Belarusian language with 10,417 students and 271 teachers, and 24 in Yiddish with 2,633 students and 99 teachers.

== Subdivisions ==
=== City counties ===
- Minsk (from 25 October 1920)

=== Land counties ===
- Bobrujsk County
- Borysów County
- Ihumeń County
- Lepel County (from 9 September 1920)
- Mińsk County
- Słuck County
- Stołpce County (from 12 December 1920)
