= Nowogródek District =

District of Second Polish Republic

Nowogródek District Okręg nowogródzki (Polish)
- District of Second Polish Republic
- 1920–1921
- Location within Second Polish Republic
- Capital: Novogrudok
- History
  - Established: 20 December 1920
  - Disestablished: 19 February 1921
- Contained within
  - Country: Second Polish Republic
- Political subdivisions: 13 counties (1920–1921); 11 counties (1921)
Preceded by
Wilno District
Brześć District
Mińsk District
Succeeded by
Nowogródek Voivodeship
Białystok Voivodeship

Nowogródek District (Note: Polish: Okręg nowogródzki) was a district of the Second Polish Republic from 1920 to 1921. Its capital was Novogrudok. It was formed on 20 December 1920 from the parts Wilno, Brześć, Mińsk Districts of the freshly disestablished Provisional Administration of Front-line and Phase Territories. On 19 February 1921 it was reformed into Nowogródek Voivodeship.

== History ==
Nowogródek District was established as the district of Second Polish Republic on 20 December 1920. It was formed from the eastern part of Wilno District, that was not given to Lithuania, northwestern part of Brześć District and a small portion of western Mińsk District. It replaced the administration of the Provisional Administration of Front-line and Phase Territories in the region. The region was governed by the Chief of District, a public official, who was a representative of the Council of Ministers, responsible for the implementation of the laws as well as superior to local administration offices.

From Wilno District were included eight counties: Brasław (excluding six municipalities incorporated into Latvia in June 1920), Duniłowicze (inclucing town of Dokshytsy and Gmina Dokszyce from Mińsk District), Dzisna, Grodno, Lida, Nowogródek, Wilejka (excluding southeaster borderlands) and Wołożyn.

From Brześć District were included 4 counties: Baranowicze, Nieśwież (inclucing Hrycewicze and Teladowicze municipalities from Mińsk District), Słonim and Wołkowysk.

From Mińsk District was included Stołpce County.

On 14 August 1921, counties of Grodno and Wołkowysk were incorporated into freshly established Białystok Voivodeship. On 19 February 1921, the district was reformed into Nowogródek Voivodeship. Additionally, it was stated that the border between the voivodeship and potential Wilno Voivodeship, that would be eventually formed from Wilno Land, would be agreed upon later.

== Subdivision ==
=== Counties ===
- Baranowicze
- Brasław
- Duniłowicze
- Dzisna
- Grodno (until 1921)
- Lida
- Nieśwież
- Nowogródek
- Słonim
- Stołpce
- Wilejka
- Wołkowysk (until 1921)
- Wołożyn
