= Volhynian District (1920–1921) =

District of Second Polish Republic

Volhynian District Okręg wołyński (Polish)
- District of Second Polish Republic
- 1920–1921
- Location within Second Polish Republic
- Capital: Lutsk
- History
  - Established: 20 December 1920
  - Reformation into Volhynian Voivodeship: 19 February 1921
- Contained within
  - Country: Second Polish Republic
- Political subdivisions: 10 counties (1920–1921); 8 counties (1921)
Preceded by	Succeeded by
Volhynian District	Volhynian Voivodeship

Volhynian District (Note: Polish: Okręg wołyński) was a district of Second Polish Republic from 1920 to 1921. Its capital was Lutsk. It was formed on 20 December 1920 from Volhynian District of the freshly disestablished Provisional Administration of Front-line and Phase Territories. On 19 February 1921 it was reformed into Volhynian Voivodeship.

== History ==
Volhynian District was established as the district of Second Polish Republic on 20 December 1920. It was formed from Volhynian District. It replaced the administration of the Provisional Administration of Front-line and Phase Territories in the region. The region was governed by the Chief of District, a public official, who was a representative of the Council of Ministers, responsible for the implementation of the laws as well as superior to local administration offices.

From Volhynian District were included 10 counties: Dubno, Horochów, Kowel, Krzemieniec, Luboml, Łuck, Ostróg County, Równe, Sarny and Włodzimierz.

On 19 February 1921, the district was reformed into Volhynian Voivodeship.

== Subdivision ==
=== Counties ===
- Dubno County
- Horochów County
- Kowel County
- Krzemieniec County
- Luboml County
- Łuck County
- Ostróg County
- Równe County
- Sarny County
- Włodzimierz County
