= Podolian District =

Administrative district of the Second Polish Republic

Podolian District Okręg podolski (Polish)
- District of Civil Administration of the Lands of Volhynia and Podolian Front
- 1920
- Location within Civil Administration of the Lands of Volhynia and Podolian Front
- Capital: Kamieniec Podolski
- History
  - Formation of Podolian District: 17 January 1920
  - Disestablished: 1920
- Contained within
  - Civil administration: Civil Administration of the Lands of Volhynia and Podolian Front
- Political subdivisions: 4 counties (until 15 May 1920); 5 counties (from 15 May 1920)
Preceded by	Succeeded by
Ukrainian Soviet Socialist Republic	Ukrainian Soviet Socialist Republic

Podolian District (Note: Polish: Okręg podolski) was a district of the Civil Administration of the Lands of Volhynia and Podolian Front that was under the control of Second Polish Republic. It existed from 17 January 1920 until summer 1920 when it was conquered by the Ukrainian SSR during the Polish–Soviet War. Its seat was located in Kamianets-Podilskyi.

== History ==
It was formed on 17 January 1920 with the establishment of the Civil Administration of the Eastern Lands, a civil authority controlled by the Second Polish Republic during the Polish–Soviet War. Its seat was located in Kamianets-Podilskyi. The region was governed by the Chief of District.

Upon its creation, it was subdivided into counties: Kamieniec, Płoskirów, Uszyca and Latyczów. On 15 May 1920, Starokonstantynów County was transferred from Volhynian to Podolian District.

The territory was conquered in the summer of 1920 by the Ukrainian SSR.

== Subdivisions ==
=== Counties ===
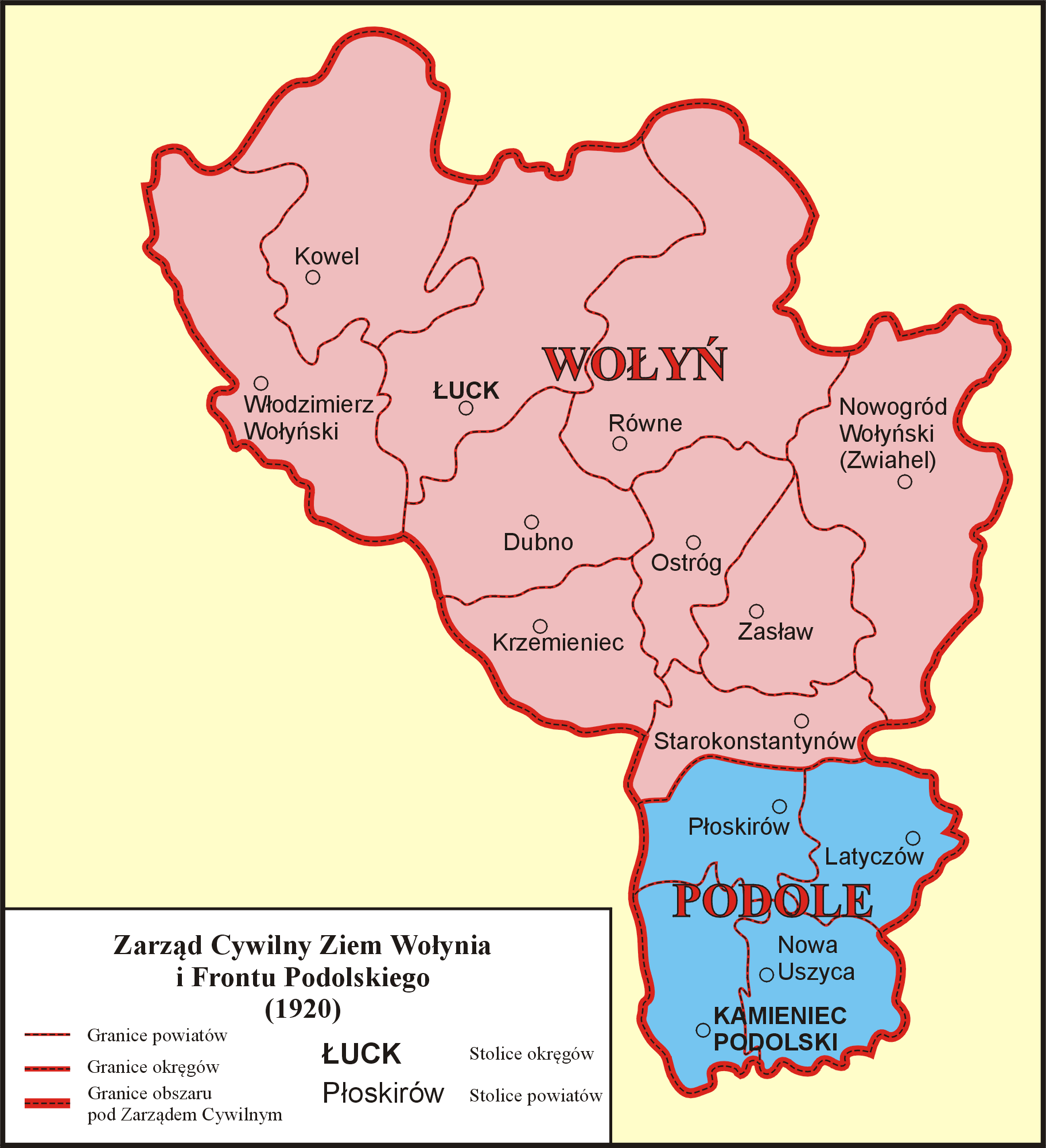
Map of counties of Civil Administration of the Lands of Volhynia and Podolian Front.

- Latyczów County
- Kamieniec County
- Płoskirów County
- Starokonstantynów County (from 15 May 1920)
- Uszyca County
