= Osadnik =

Polish settlers in Western Belarus and Western Ukraine

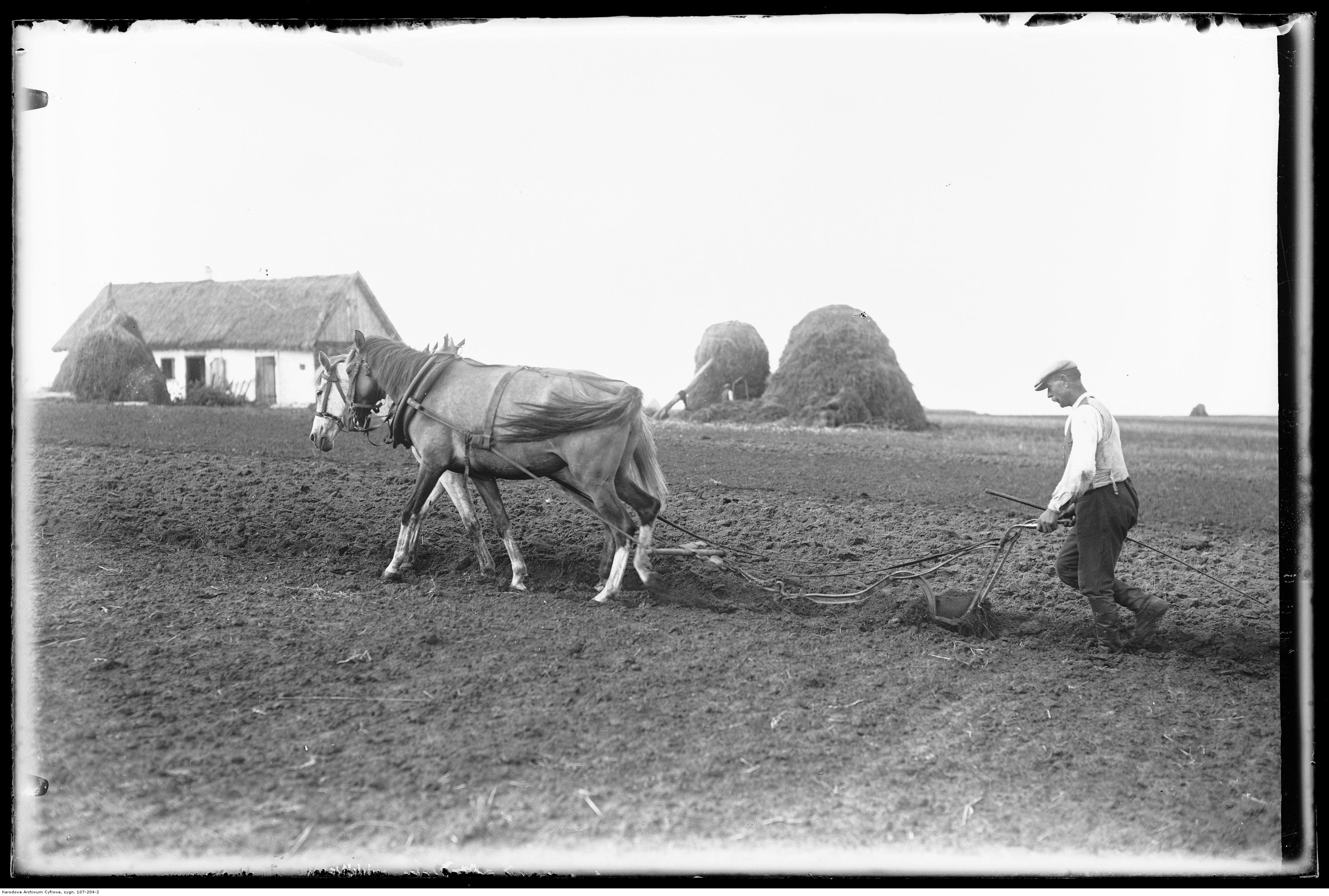
Polish military settler from Osada Krechowiecka in the Wołyń Voivodeship, 1928

Osadniks (Polish: osadnik/osadnicy, "settler/settlers, colonist/colonists") were veterans of the Polish Army and civilians who were given or sold state land in the Kresy (current Western Belarus and Western Ukraine) territory ceded to Poland by Polish-Soviet Riga Peace Treaty of 1921 (and occupied by the Soviet Union in 1939 and ceded to it after World War II). The Polish word was also a loanword that was used in the Soviet Union.

== Settlement process ==
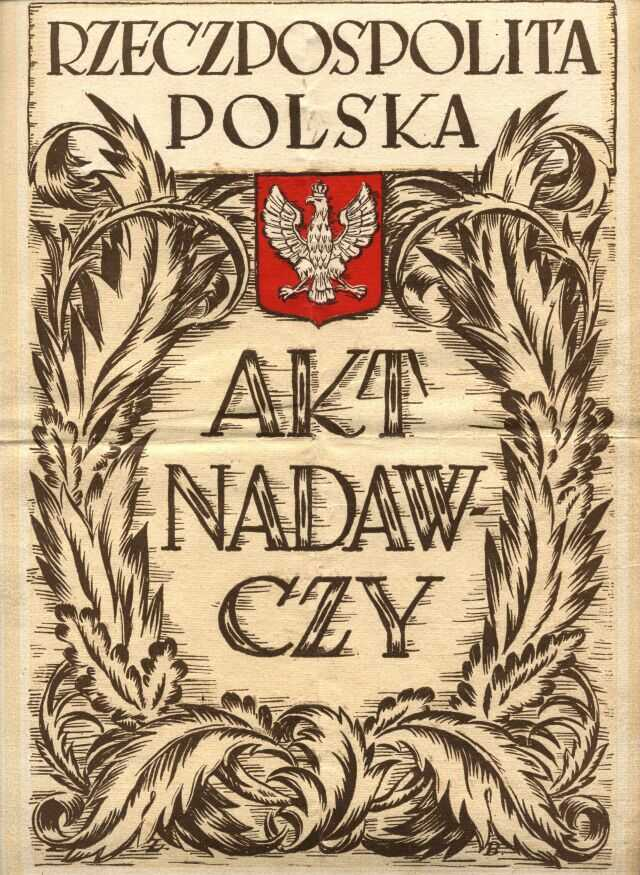
Cover of a land allotment document from 1923; all together some 8000 people received land in the eastern Voivodeships of Poland

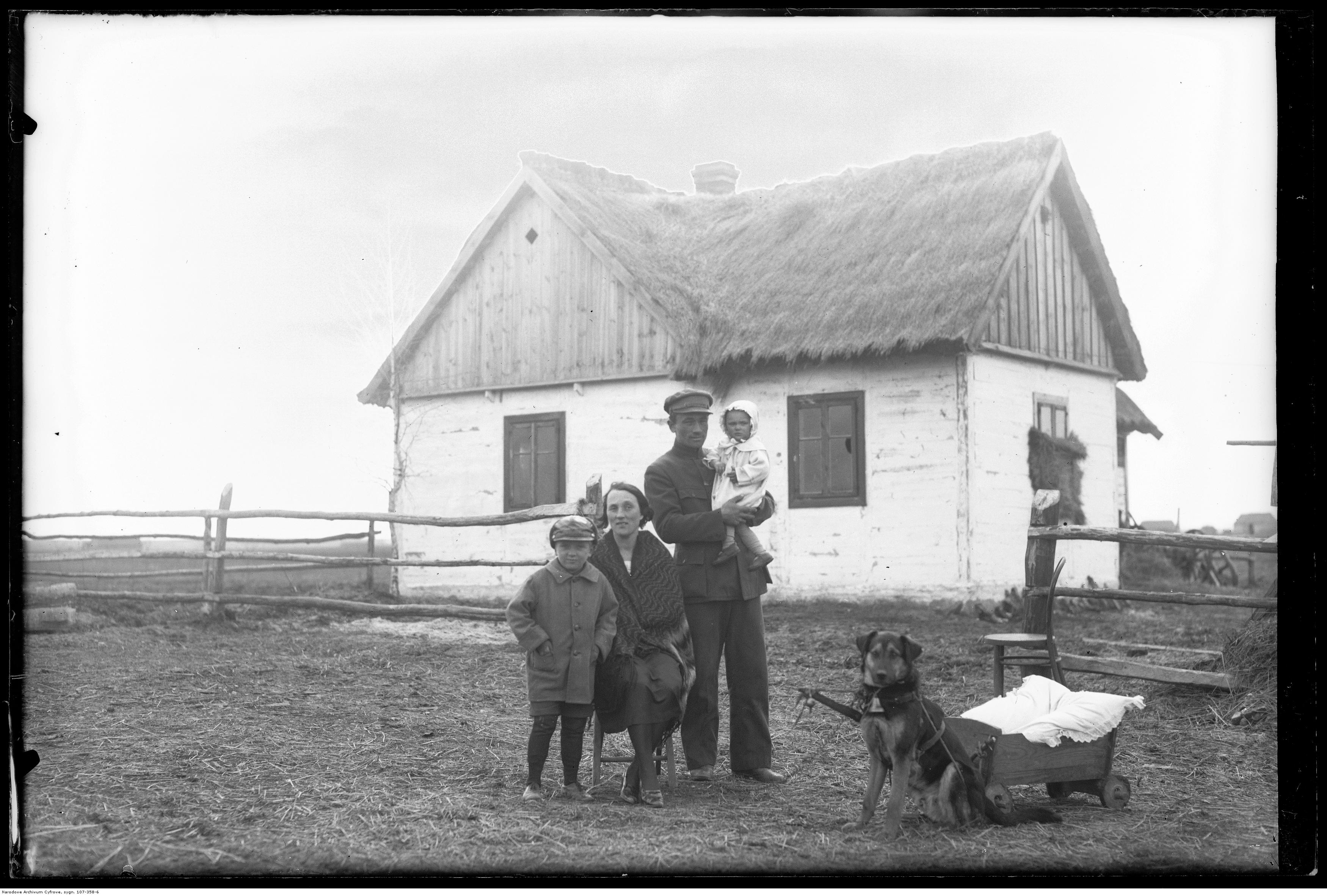
Osadnik's family from Osada Krechowiecka, 1931

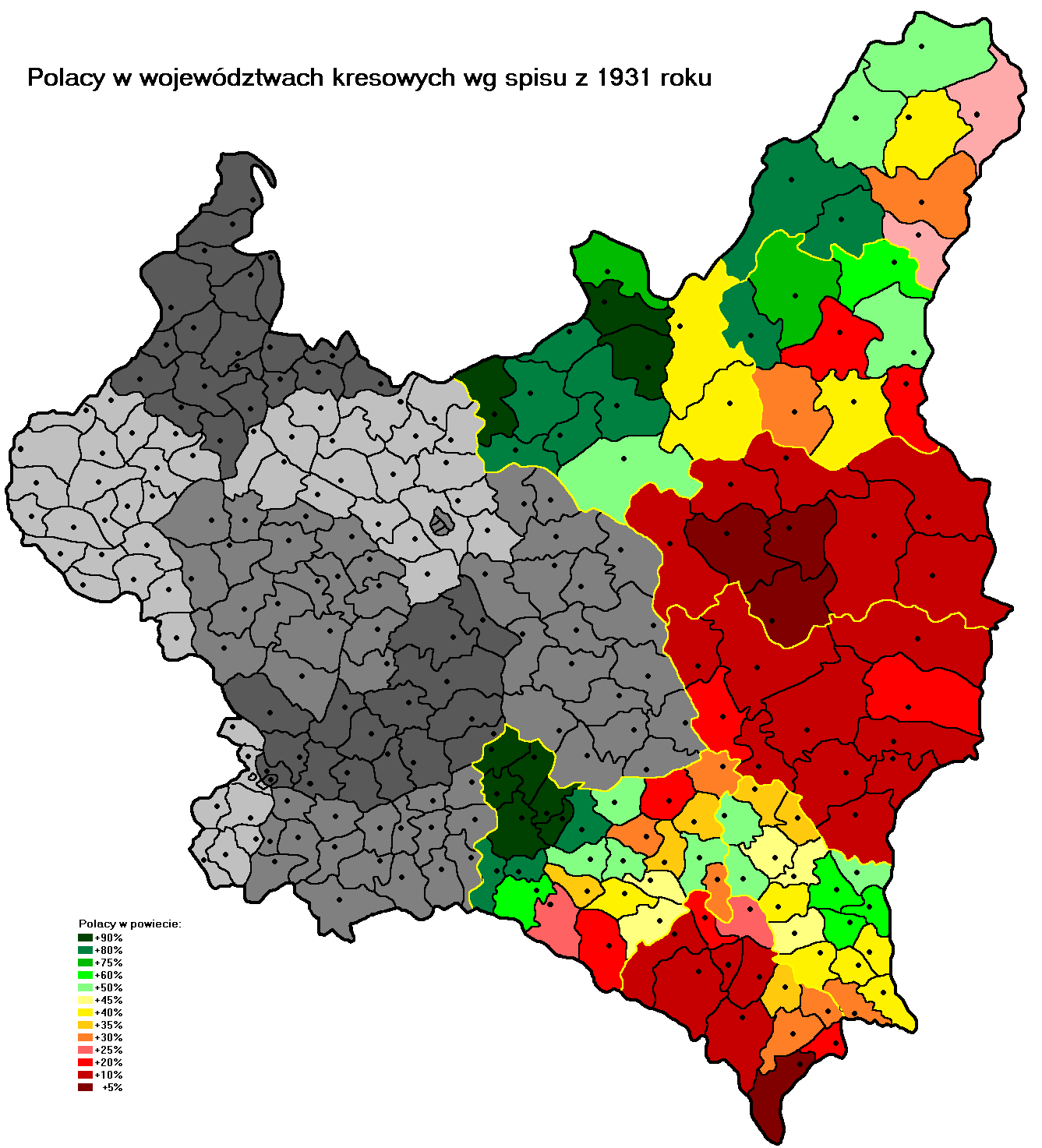
The percentage of ethnic Poles in various parts of the Kresy in 1931.

Shortly before the Battle of Warsaw on August 7, 1920, Polish Prime Minister Wincenty Witos announced that after the war, volunteers and soldiers who served on the front would have priority in purchase of state-owned land, while the soldiers to receive medals for bravery would receive land free of charge. The announcement was partly to repair the Polish morale, shaken after the retreat from the east. On December 17 the Sejm (Polish parliament) passed the Act on Nationalization of North-Eastern Powiats of the Republic and Act on Granting the Soldiers of the Polish Army with Land. Both acts allowed the demobilised soldiers to apply for land parcels. The acts of parliament applied for powiats of Grodno and Wołożyn of Białystok Voivodeship, as well as 20 other powiats in the eastern voivodeships of Poland.

In the spring of 1921, the first groups of settlers arrived to newly-established settlements in Wołyń. According to the Polish historian Lidia Głowacka, they were in what had been the property of major landowners: the Russian treasury ("kazyonnye zemli") and the tsar's family, some secularised monasteries or lands abandoned by the Russian nobility retreating from the area before the German arrival in 1915. Some land was also purchased by the state from the Polish nobility.

A typical plot of land had the area of under 20 hectares, but soldiers with a university diploma could in theory receive up to 45 hectares free of charge, to create the so-called exemplary farms. In reality, however, there were more applicants than free land and even the recipients of the Virtuti Militari medal had to pay for their plots. Although the government promised help to the settlers, most of them received little but the land itself. Some regiments in which the soldiers had served provided them with forage and demobilized horses. The cost of the land itself was to be repaid by the settlers five years after the start of the programme, with the yearly rent set at 30–100 kg of rye per hectare.

Permanent economical difficulties of the newly-re-established state and strong opposition to the idea of creation of soldier settlements along the eastern border of Poland caused the action to be halted in 1923. It was equally opposed by local major landowners and peasantry. The former feared that their own property might also be nationalised and distributed among the settlers, and the latter was enraged by the fact that the redistributed land had often been rented to them by the previous owners, but the deals were made null and void by the Russian state's disappearance and the nationalisation.

By 1923, out of the 99,153 applicants, only 7,345 actually received the parcels. Out of the hundreds of planned villages in the Wołyń Voivodeship only three were ever actually created, with 51 inhabitants all together. The pace of the action was equally slow in other parts of the area. Altogether, the land granted to the demobilized soldiers amounted to 1,331.46 km^{2}. Out of the 8,732 plots of land allotted to demobilised soldiers, only 5,557 had actually been settled by January 1, 1923. Some state-owned land parcels were also sold to civilians, which established civilian or mixed settlements.

Although after the May Coup d'État of 1926 the action was restarted, it never gained significant momentum and then came to a complete halt between 1929 and 1933. Altogether, the osadnik families received over 6000 km^{2} of land. The government tried to revive the project once more after 1935, with little success. Because of the Great Depression, the prices of basic food products dropped, and all settler farms were losing money, with the average debt reaching 458 złoty (€800–1700) per hectare of land.

Most of the military and civilian settlers were members of the Settlers' Union (Polish: Centralny Związek Osadników Wojskowych). The organisation, founded as early as March 1922, promoted self-sufficient osadnik communities, provided them with cheap credits, scholarships at various universities of agriculture and founded a number of schools.

== Soviet repression ==
After the 1939 Soviet invasion of Poland, Belarusian communists murdered a number of osadniks such as in Trzeciaki, Budowla and Lerypol of the Grodno County (1919–1939).

After the incorporation of Kresy into the Soviet Union, the term osadnik became one of the categories of crimes in a Soviet penal system. Initially branded as kulaks, from the first days, they became a target of Soviet propaganda as "enemies of the people". Their property was often taken by the new authorities in violation of Soviet law and there were numerous cases of government-inspired violence against them. That led approximately 10% of the settlers to abandon their homes and to escape through the so-called Border of Peace to German-held General Government.

Since late 1939, osadniks were being deported en masse to Northern European Russia, Ural and Siberia, according to the Sovnarkom's Decree about special settlement and labor engagement of "osadniks" deported from Western areas of UkSSR and BSSR of December 29, 1939. It was broadened to include all formerly Polish citizens who purchased any land after 1918, whether real settlers from other parts of Poland or local peasants who bought land in neighbouring villages. An estimated 140,000 osadniks were deported on February 10, 1940, be they real or alleged osadniks. Most of them (about 115,000) were Polish, but there were 10,000 Ukrainians, 11,000 Belarusians and 2,000 others. In gulag paperwork, osadniks were in a separate category of deportees: "special settlers — 'osadniks' and 'foresters'". Then, three more waves of Polish deportations were carried out and classified with different categories. The largest deported Polish population was in Arkhangelsk Oblast: all of the Soviet labor camps in the Kotlas area were filled with Polish nationals. High mortality of deported was reported. For example, by July 1, 1941, over 10,000 osadniks were officially reported dead.

== See also ==
- Polish minority in the Soviet Union
- Polish population transfers (1944–1946)
