= Polesian District =

District of Second Polish Republic

Polesian District Okręg poleski (Polish)
- District of Second Polish Republic
- 1920–1921
- Location within Second Polish Republic
- Capital: Pinsk
- History
  - Established: 20 December 1920
  - Reformation into Polesie Voivodeship: 14 August 1921
- Contained within
  - Country: Second Polish Republic
- Political subdivisions: 9 counties (1920–1921); 8 counties (1921)
Preceded by	Succeeded by
Brześć District; Volhynian District	Polesian Voivodeship; Białystok Voivodeship

Polesian District (Note: Polish: Okręg poleski) was a district of Second Polish Republic from 1920 to 1921. Its capital was Pinsk. It was formed on 20 December 1920 from the parts of Brześć and Volhynian Districts of the freshly disestablished Provisional Administration of Front-line and Phase Territories. On 19 February 1921 it was reformed into Polesian Voivodeship.

== History ==
Polesian District was established as the district of Second Polish Republic on 20 December 1920. It was formed from the northwestern part of Brześć District and a northern part of Volhynian District. It replaced the administration of the Provisional Administration of Front-line and Phase Territories in the region. The region was governed by the Chief of District, a public official, who was a representative of the Council of Ministers, responsible for the implementation of the laws as well as superior to local administration offices.

From Brześć District were included 8 counties: Białowieża, Brześć, Drohiczyn, Kobryń, Kosów, Łuniniec, Pińsk and Prużana County. From Volhynian District was included Koszyrski County.

On 14 August 1921, Białowieża County waw incorporated into then-established Białystok Voivodeship. On 19 February 1921, the district was reformed into the Polesian Voivodeship.

== Subdivision ==
=== Counties ===
- Białowieża County (until 1921)
- Brześć County
- Drohiczyn County
- Kobryń County
- Kosów County
- Koszyrski County
- Łuniniec County
- Pińsk County
- Prużana County
