= Haftka =

Haftka or Hafftka is a Polish and Jewish family name of Polish origin. The Polish word literally means "hook-and-eye". Notable people with this surname include:

- Aleksander Hafftka (1892–1964), Polish Jewish historian and statesman
- Michael Hafftka, American figurative expressionist painter
- Raphael Haftka (1944–2020), American engineer
