= Żeniówka massacre =

Coordinates: 50.5000°N 25.8833°E

Żeniówka
- Village (eradicated)
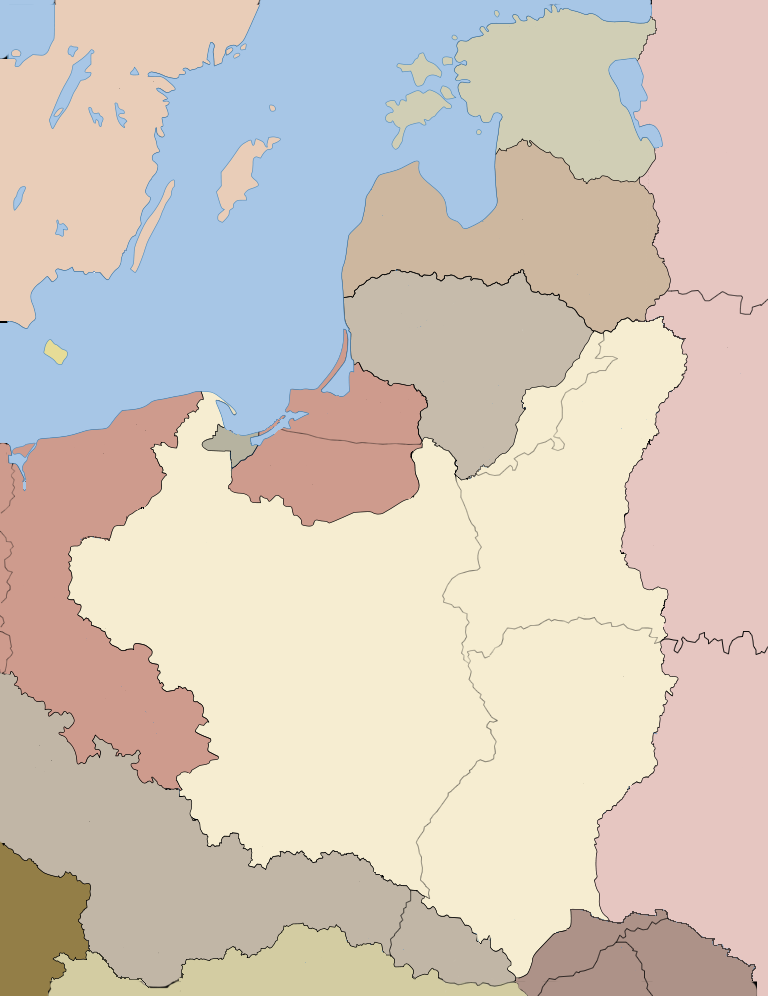
- Żeniówka village location prior to UPA ethnic cleansig (map of the Second Polish Republic from before the Nazi-Soviet invasion in 1939)
- Interactive map of Żeniówka
- Country: Poland
- Voivodeship: Wołyń Voivodeship
- County: Dubno

Żeniówka, also known as Ziniówka, Ziuniuwka or Ziniejowka, was a Polish settlement in the Wołyń Voivodeship (1921–1939), gmina Warkowicze, Dubno county, on the Ikva River, in Second Polish Republic before the Nazi German and Soviet invasion of Poland in September 1939.

The village (area now in Ukraine) was the site of Ukrainian Insurgent Army (UPA) ethnic cleansing of Poles between 1942 and 1945. The village no longer exists.

== See also ==
- Massacres of Poles in Volhynia

== Sources ==
- Władysław and Ewa Siemaszko, Ludobójstwo dokonane przez nacjonalistów ukraińskich na ludności polskiej Wołynia 1939 - 1945. WYKAZ MIEJSCOWOŚCI; accessed 13 December 2014.
- Leonard Urbanowicz, Spis miejscowości powiatu DUBIEŃSKIEGO w województwie wołyńskim, wolyn.ovh.org; accessed 13 December 2014.
