= Aleksander Hafftka =

Polish Jewish historian and statesman

- Born: Aleksander Zygmunt Hafftka; November 24, 1892; Częstochowa
- Died: June 2, 1964 (aged 71)
- Occupations: historian and statesman

Aleksander Zygmunt Hafftka (November 24, 1892 – June 2, 1964) was a Polish Jewish historian and statesman.

== Life ==
Hafftka was born November 24, 1892, in Częstochowa to a family of a wealthy Jew Tuwia Hafftka, who owned of a porcelain factory.

In 1919 he took a position in the Civil Administration of the Eastern Lands, Wilno District soon becoming in charge of information about Jewish affairs.

During the Polish-Bolshevik War Hafftka was conscripted and served aide-de-camp to general Lucjan Żeligowski and his advisor in national affairs. When the latter staged a pretense coup and established the Republic of Central Lithuania Hafftka joined its state apparatus while remaining advisor to Żeligowski.

In the government of Józef Piłsudski (1918–1928), Aleksander Hafftka became the highest-ranking Jewish statesman. During 1927–1937, he was head of the Jewish Division in the Nationalities Department of the Ministry of Internal Affairs of Poland. He was fired from the position amid accusations in taking bribes from the Society in Defense of Ritual Slaughter. Although he was exonerated and won a defamation process, he was never restored in any governmental position. This is thought to be related with the rise of anti-Semitism in post-Pilsudski Poland, and also with changes in the state politics in national affairs. Later he joined a group that assisted resettling Jewish German refugees in Poland.

After the German invasion of Poland Hafftka's family escaped from Warsaw to Wilno. In about a year they managed to secure transit visas with the help of Japanese consul to Lithuania, Chiune Sugihara and eventually settled in New York City.

== Works ==
He was co-publisher and editor of the Polish-Jewish Encyclopedia (Encyklopedia Żydów Polskich), and the author of Anti-Semitism in the German Republic.

=== Publications ===
- Ustawodawstwo Polski odrodzonej w stosunku do żydowskiej mniejszości narodowej
- Żydzi w Polsce odrodzonej. Działalność społeczna, gospodarcza, oświatowa i kulturalna (Vols. 1 and 2, co-author)
- Żydowskie ugrupowania polityczne w Polsce
- Żydowskie stronnictwa polityczne w Polsce Odrodzonej
- Der Antisemitismus in der deutschen Republik (under pen name Fritz Marburg, Vienna, 1931)
