= Battle of Ludvypol =

Battle of Liudvypol
- Part of the Eastern Front of World War II
Date	28 March 1943
Location	Ludvypol (now Sosnove, Rivne Oblast, Ukraine)
Result	Ukrainian victory

Belligerents
Ukrainian Insurgent Army	Germany

Commanders and leaders
Adam Rudyk; Andriy Dovhalets	Unknown

Strength
Unknown	1,500 soldiers

Casualties and losses
17 killed 20 wounded 9 captured	58–70 killed 5 burned cars

The Battle of Ludvypol was a battle between the "Shavuly" and "Skydry" detachments of Ukrainian Insurgent Army led by Adam Rudyk and Andriy Dovhalets and the German forces during World War II that took place on 28 March 1943 near the village of Ludvypol (now Sosnove, Rivne Oblast). The German army launched several attacks in order to destroy the UPA detachments near Lyudvypol but was defeated and forced to retreat.

== Battle ==
On 28 March 1943, the German army tried to destroy Ukrainian detachments in Liudvypol. They launched an attacks from the directions of Rivne, Kostopil, Mezhyrich and Berezne. Once approaching the village, the Germans encircled it, started firing on the Ukrainian positions and launched several assaults, however all of them were repelled. Not being able to capture Liudvypol, the Germans were forced to retreat towards Kostopil.

== Aftermath ==
The Germans lost 58 to 70 people dead and 5 cars burned during the battle.

== Bibliography ==
- Денищук, Олександр (2008). Боротьба УПА проти німецьких окупантів: хронологія подій [The UPA's struggle against the German occupiers: chronology of events] (in Ukrainian). ППДМ. ISBN 978-966-8424-86-1.
- Mirchuk (1953). Українська повстанська армія (1942–1952) [Ukrainian Insurgent Army (1942–1952)] (PDF) (in Ukrainian).
