= Sosnove =

Rural locality in Rivne Oblast, Ukraine

- Rural settlement
- Main Street and square in Sosnove

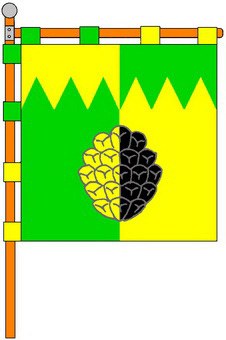
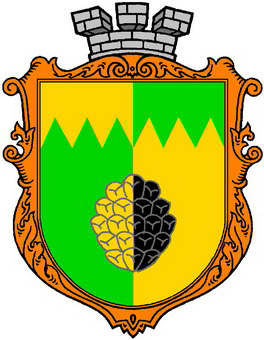
- Flag Coat of arms

- Location within Rivne Oblast Location within Ukraine
- Coordinates: 50°49′N 27°00′E
- Country: Ukraine
- Oblast: Rivne Oblast
- Raion: Rivne Raion
- Hromada: Sosnove settlement hromada
- Founded: 1708

Population (2022)
  - Total: 1,925
- Time zone: UTC+2 (EET)
  - Summer (DST): UTC+3 (EEST)

Sosnove (Ukrainian: Соснове) is a rural settlement in Rivne Raion of Rivne Oblast, Ukraine, located in the historic region of Volhynia. Population: 1,925 (2022 estimate).

The Sluch River flows through the settlement.

== History ==
Historical affiliations

Polish–Lithuanian Commonwealth 1708–1793
Russian Empire 1793–1917
Ukrainian People's Republic/Ukrainian State 1917-1919
Second Polish Republic 1919–1945
Soviet Union 1939–1941 (occupation)
Nazi Germany 1941–1944 (occupation)
Soviet Union 1944–1945 (occupation)
Soviet Union 1945–1991
Ukraine 1991–present

The town of Sosnove was founded in 1708 after the town of Hubków, which lies 4 km to the east of current day Sosnove, was destroyed during the Swedish invasion of Poland during the Great Northern War.

Before 1918 Sosnove was a settlement in Volhynian Governorate of the Russian Empire.

Between World War I and World War II Sosnove was a capital of the Sosnove gmina in Kostopol County, Wołyń Voivodship of Poland, and its population was mostly Jewish. The Gmina Sosnove consisted of villages, colonies, and hutors in most cases no longer in existence; not even traces of their names remain.

There is a memorial for the mass grave of Ludvipol Jewish families killed by the Nazis in 1942. The memorial is located in the forest across the Sluch, a short way from town.

The Wójt for the gmina during this inter-war period was Marian Chołodecki. Sometime during 1944 the entire town of Sosnove was burned to the ground in retaliation for the killing of some German soldiers by local partisans. The eradication of the Gmina Sosnove was a result of both the ethnic cleansing by Ukrainian nationalists in World War II especially in 1943, as well as the population transfer conducted by the Soviets in 1945. The remaining inhabitants were moved to the Recovered Territories of Poland.

In its place a new settlement called Sosnove was built.

In January 1989 the population was 2,213.

In January 2013 the population was 2,033.

Until 26 January 2024, Sosnove was designated urban-type settlement. On this day, a new law came into force which abolished this status, and Sosnove became a rural settlement.

== Other names and spelling variations ==
- Sosnovoje (Russian)
- Selisht, Selishche (Yiddish)
- Seish Scihin (Yiddish)
- Siedlisczce, Siedliszcze (Polish)
- Sagol Slistht (German)
- Sosnove, Ludvipol, Lyudvipol (Ukrainian)
- Sosnove (Polish)
- Lyudvilpol (Hungarian)
- Lyudvopol (Czech)
