= Raphael Haftka =

American engineer (1944–2020)

Raphael T. Haftka
- רפאל האפטקה
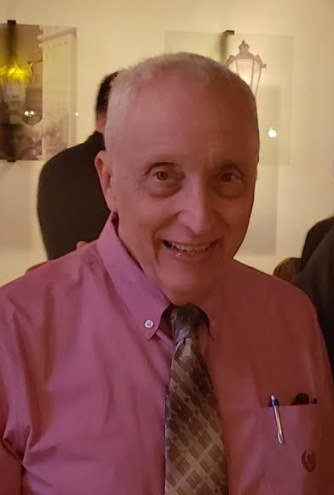
- Born: February 22, 1944 (age 82); Tel Aviv, Israel
- Died: August 16, 2020 (aged 76)
- Education: Technion – Israel Institute of Technology, University of California, San Diego
- Awards: Elected Fellow of the American Institute of Aeronautics and Astronautics
- Scientific career
- Fields: Engineering
- Workplaces: University of Florida

Raphael T. Haftka (Hebrew: רפאל האפטקה; February 22, 1944 – August 16, 2020) was an American engineer, a distinguished professor at University of Florida and an Elected Fellow of the American Institute of Aeronautics and Astronautics.

Raphael T. Haftka was born on February 22, 1944, in Tel-Aviv, Israel. He earned his B.Sc. in aeronautical engineering in 1965 and his M.Sc. in 1968 from the Technion – Israel Institute of Technology. In 1971, he received his Ph.D. from the Department of Aerospace and Mechanical Engineering Sciences at the University of California, San Diego.
