= Civil Administration of the Lands of Volhynia and Podolian Front =

Short lived Polish civil authorities in 1920

Civil Administration of the Lands of Volhynia and Podolian Front Zarząd Cywilny Ziem Wołynia i Frontu Podolskiego (Polish)
- 1920
- Flag of Poland

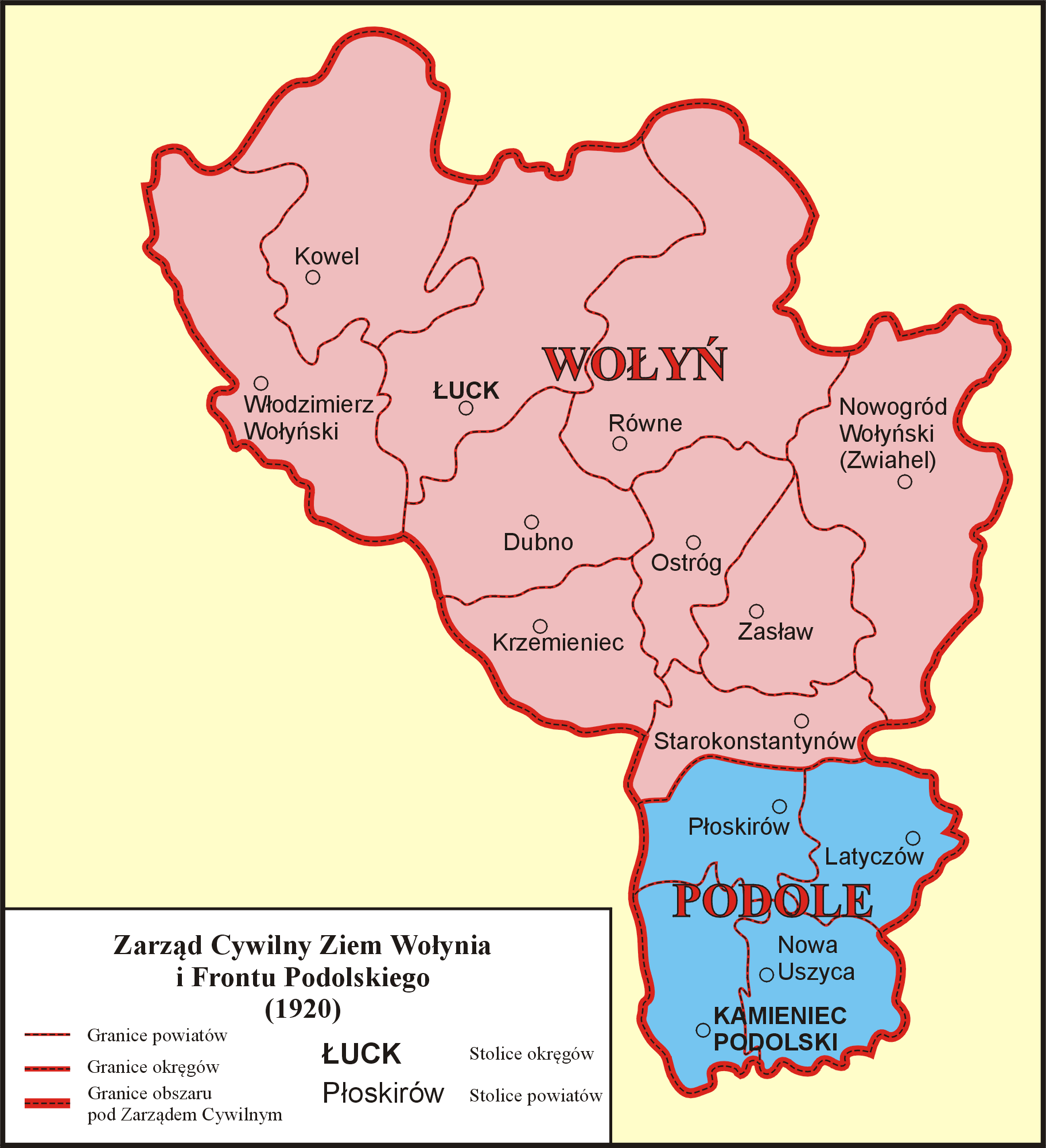
- Map of civil administration subdivisions.
- Status: Civil authority
- Official languages: Polish
- Chief Commissioner
  - 1920: Antoni Mińkiewicz
- Historical era: Interwar
Preceded by
Civil Administration of the Eastern Lands
Succeeded by
Provisional Administration of Front-line and Phase Territories
Poland
Russian SFSR

Civil Administration of the Lands of Volhynia and Podolian Front, (Note: Polish: Zarząd Cywilny Ziem Wołynia i Frontu Podolskiego, abriviation: ZCZWiFP) also known as Commissariat of the Lands of Volhynia and Podolian Front (Note: Polish: Komisariat Ziem Wołynia i Frontu Podolskiego) was a civil authority of the territories controlled by Second Polish Republic but not incorporated into the state itself, that was formed during the Polish–Soviet War in 1920. It was formed on 17 January 1920 from the Civil Administration of the Eastern Lands and included Volhynian District and the surrounding area. In the summer of 1920, forces of Russian SFSR had conquered the area. After part of the area was reconquered by Poland, the administration was formally disestablished on 9 September 1920, and replaced by the Provisional Administration of Front-line and Phase Territories.

== History ==
Civil Administration of Volhynian Lands and Podolian Front was established by Second Polish Republic on 17 January 1920, as a civil authority of the territories controlled but not incorporated into the state itself. It was formed from part of an area controlled by Civil Administration of the Eastern Lands, including the Volhynian District separated from the civil authority and newly formed Podolian District that consisted of the lands conquered on the Podolian Front. The territory was ruled by the Chief Commissioner Antoni Mińkiewicz, who after the formation was subjected to the General Commissioner of the Eastern Lands. On 1 June 1920, the territory was placed under the rule of the Commander-in-chief of the Polish Armed Forces.

On 1 June 1920, counties: Włodzimierz, Kowel, Łuck, Dubno, Równe as well as part of Ostróg incorporated into Równe and northwest part of Krzemieniec were incorporated into Poland itself.

In the summer of 1920, forces of Russian SFSR had conquered the area. After part of the area was reconquered by Poland, the administration was formally disestablished on 9 September 1920, and replaced by the Provisional Administration of Front-line and Phase Territories.

== Subdivisions ==
The Civil Administration of the Lands of Volhynia and Podolian Front consisted of two districts: Volhynian and Podolian.

Volhynian District was subdivided into counties: Włodzimierz, Kowel, Łuck, Dubno, Równe, Ostróg, Krzemieniec, Zwiahel, Zasław, Sarny (from 15 March 1920) and Starokonstantynów (until 15 May 1920).

Podolian District was subdivided into counties: Kamieniec, Płoskirów, Uszyca, Latyczów and Starokonstantynów (from 15 May 1920).

On 15 March 1920, was established Sarny County, Volhynian District, that was formed from the municipalities of Równe County: Wysock, Dąbrowica, Lubikowicze, Niemowicze, Wiry as well as three newly added municipalities: Kisorycze, Olewsk and Jurowo.

On 15 May 1920, Starokonstantynów County was transferred from Volhynian to Podolian District.

On 1 June 1920, counties: Włodzimierz, Kowel, Łuck, Dubno, Równe as well as part of Ostróg incorporated into Równe and northwest part of Krzemieniec were incorporated into Poland itself.

== Bibliography ==
- Waldemar Kozyra, Polityka administracyjna władz polskich na Ziemiach Wschodnich Rzeczypospolitej Polskiej w latach 1918–1926, Białystok 2005
- Adam Janusz Mielcarek, Podziały terytorialno-administracyjne II Rzeczypospolitej w zakresie administracji zespolonej, Warszawa 2008
- Adam Janusz Mielcarek, Granica Wołyńska. Terytorialne postanowienia układu Piłsudski-Petlura, w: „Wiadomości Historyczne”, lipiec-sierpień 2010, nr 4 (290), s. 39–44.
- Adam Janusz Mielcarek, Węzłowe zagadnienia ustrojowe Zarządu Cywilnego Ziem Wschodnich (1919-1920), w świetle aktów normatywnych, w: „Studia z Dziejów Państwa i Prawa Polskiego”, Kraków – Lublin – Łódź 2011, T. 14, s. 241–251.
- Dziennik Urzędowy Zarządu Cywilnego Ziem Wołynia i Frontu Podolskiego
