= Civil Administration of the Eastern Lands =

Civil Administration of the Eastern Lands Zarząd Cywilny Ziem Wschodnich (Polish)
- 1919–1920
- Flag of Poland

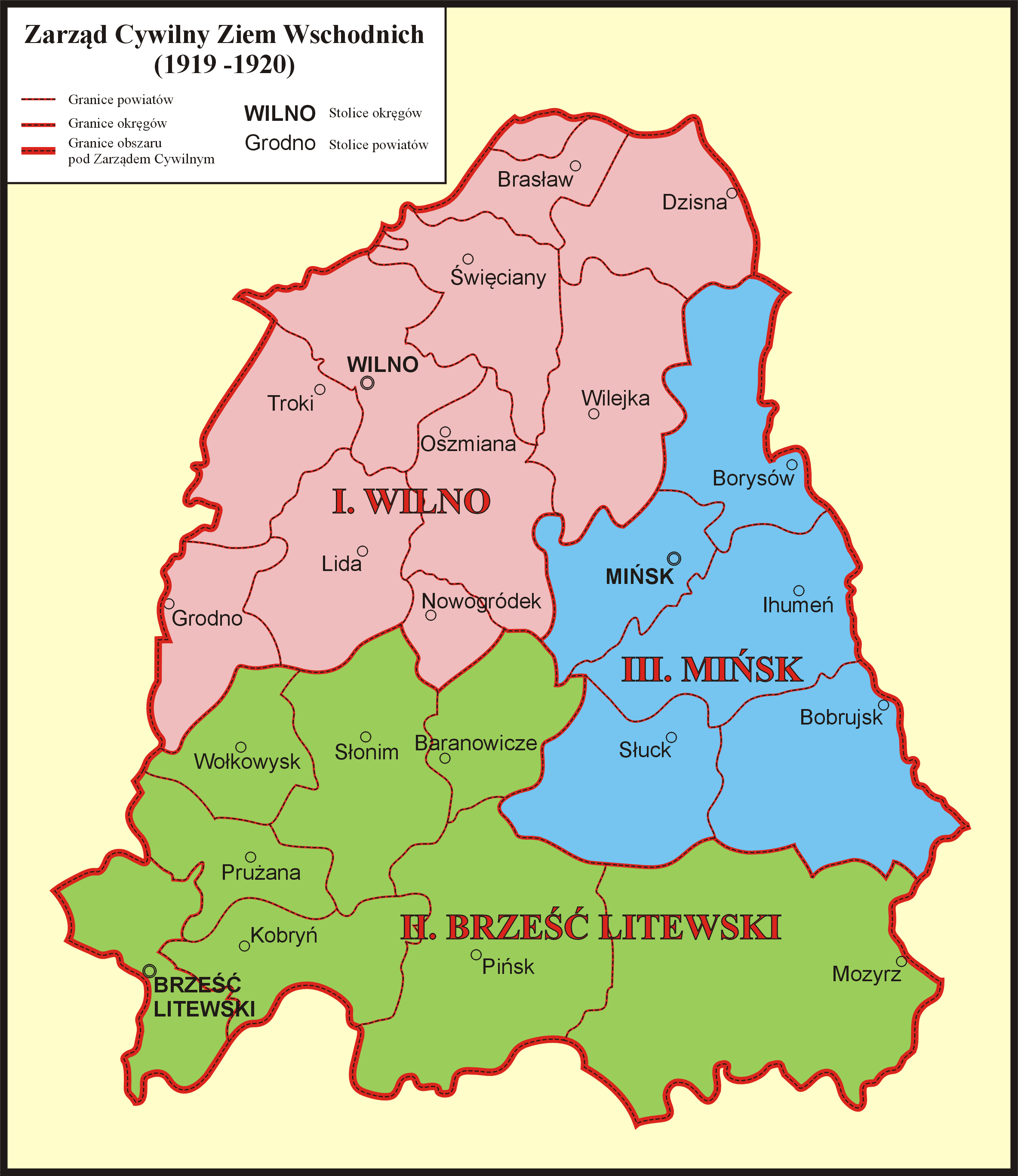
- Map of civil administration subdivisions.
- Status: Civil authority
- Official languages: Polish
- Chief Commissioner
  - 1919: Ludwik Kolankowski
  - 1919–1920: Jerzy Osmołowski
- Historical era: Interwar
  - Established: 19 February 1919
  - Direct control over territory given to the Council of Ministers of Poland: 29 May 1920
  - Formation of Civil Administration of the Lands of Volhynia and Podolian Front from part of the territory: 17 January 1920
  - Transformation into Provisional Administration of Front-line and Phase Territories: 9 September 1920
Preceded by
Russian SFSR
Succeeded by
Civil Administration of the Lands of Volhynia and Podolian Front
Provisional Administration of Front-line and Phase Territories
Russian SFSR

Civil Administration of the Eastern Lands (Note: Polish: Zarząd Cywilny Ziem Wschodnich, abriviation: ZCZW) was a civil authority of the territories controlled by Second Polish Republic but not incorporated into the state itself, that was formed during the Polish–Soviet War in 1919 and existed until 1920. It was formed on 19 February 1919 from the territories taken by Poland during the war, that were previously occupied by the Russian SFSR. In the summer of 1920, forces of Russian SFSR had conquered the area. After part of the area was reconquered by Poland, the administration was formally disestablished on 9 September 1920, and replaced by the Provisional Administration of Front-line and Phase Territories.

== History ==
Civil Administration of the Eastern Lands was established by Second Polish Republic on 19 February 1919, during the Polish–Soviet War, as a civil authority of the territories controlled but not incorporated into the state itself. It was formed from the territories taken by Poland during the war, that were previously occupied by the Russian SFSR. It was established by the decision of the Commander-in-chief of the Polish Armed Forces, and was placed under the rule of Chief Commissioner. On 22 April 1920, after the Vilna offensive, and taking control of Vilnius by Poland, Józef Piłsudski, had made a speech, known as Proclamation to the inhabitants of the former Grand Duchy of Lithuania, in which he had announced that the conquered territories would be placed under a civil administration rather than a military one.

On 17 February 1920, the Volhynian District together with neighboring lands, that would later form Podolian District, were transferred to the newly formed Civil Administration of the Lands of Volhynia and Podolian Front. On 1 June 1920, with the decision of the Commander-in-chief of the Polish Armed Forces, the administration was placed under the direct control Council of Ministers of Poland.

In the summer of 1920, forces of Russian SFSR had conquered the area. After part of the area was reconquered by Poland, the administration was formally disestablished on 9 September 1920, and replaced by the Provisional Administration of Front-line and Phase Territories.

== Subdivisions ==
The administration was subdivided into 4 districts that were: Brześć District, Mińsk District, Wilno District and Volhynian District.

On 17 February 1920, the Volhynian District together with neighboring lands, that would later form Podolian District, were transferred to the newly formed Civil Administration of the Lands of Volhynia and Podolian Front.

== List of Chief Commissioners ==
- Ludwik Kolankowski (19 February 1919 – 15 April 1919)
- Jerzy Osmołowski (15 April 1919 – 1920)

== Bibliography ==
- Waldemar Kozyra, Polityka administracyjna władz polskich na Ziemiach Wschodnich Rzeczypospolitej Polskiej w latach 1918–1926, Białystok 2005
- Joanna Gierowska-Kałłaur, Zarząd Cywilny Ziem Wschodnich, Warszawa 2003 s. 447 + ilustr.
- Adam Janusz Mielcarek, Podziały terytorialno-administracyjne II Rzeczypospolitej w zakresie administracji zespolonej, Warszawa 2008
- Adam Janusz Mielcarek, Węzłowe zagadnienia ustrojowe Zarządu Cywilnego Ziem Wschodnich (1919-1920), w świetle aktów normatywnych, w: „Studia z Dziejów Państwa i Prawa Polskiego”, Kraków – Lublin – Łódź 2011, T. 14, s. 241–251.
- Dziennik Urzędowy Zarządu Cywilnego Ziem Wschodnich
- Norman Davies. White Eagle, Red Star: the Polish Soviet War, 1919-20. London: Pimlico. 1972. ISBN 0-7126-0694-7.
