= Religious police =

Religious police may refer to:

- Cathedral constable
- Islamic religious police
