= Wołyń Voivodeship (1921–1939) =

Former voivodeship of Poland

Coordinates: 50°44′41″N 25°19′13″E

Wołyń Voivodeship Województwo wołyńskie
- Voivodeship of Poland
- 1921–1939
- Coat of arms

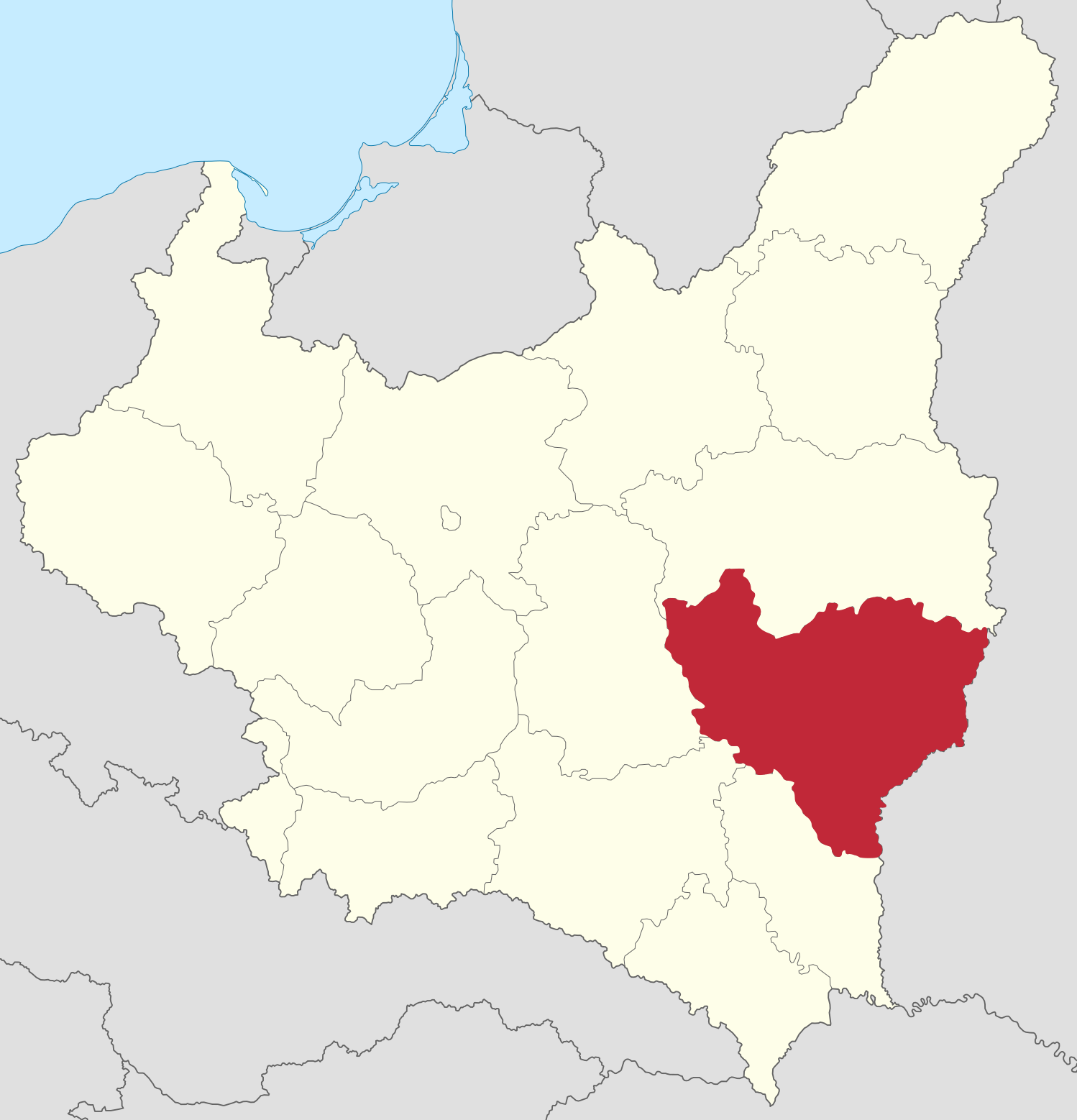
- Wołyń Voivodeship (red) on the map of Second Polish Republic
- Capital: Łuck
- Area
  - 1921: 30,274 km^{2} (11,689 sq mi)
  - 1939: 35,754 km^{2} (13,805 sq mi)
- Population
  - 1921: 1,437,907
  - 1931: 2,085,574
- Government
  - Type: Voivodeship
- Voivodes
  - Mar-Jul 1921: Stanisław Jan Krzakowski
  - 1938-1939: Aleksander Hauke-Nowak
- Historical era: Interwar period
  - Established: 19 February 1921
  - Soviet invasion: 17 September 1939
- Political subdivisions: 11 powiats
Preceded by	Succeeded by
Volhynian District	Ukrainian SSR
- Today part of: Ukraine

Wołyń Voivodeship (Polish: Województwo wołyńskie, Ukrainian: Волинське воєводство, romanized: volinske voyevodstvo) or Wołyń Province was an administrative region of interwar Poland (1918–1939) with an area of 35,754 km^{2}, 22 cities, and provincial capital in Łuck.

The province was divided into 11 counties (powiaty). The area comprised part of the historical region of Volhynia.

At the end of World War II, at the insistence of Joseph Stalin and the Soviet Union during the 1943 Tehran Conference, Poland's borders were redrawn by the Allies. The province's Polish population was forcibly resettled westward; and the province's territory was incorporated into the Soviet Union's Ukrainian SSR.

Since 1991 it has been divided between sovereign Ukraine's Rivne and Volyn Oblasts.

== History ==
After a century of foreign rule, the Second Polish Republic was reborn in the aftermath of World War I. The borders of the republic were ratified by the Treaty of Versailles signed on 28 June 1919. They were a result of several cross-national conflicts including Polish–Ukrainian War (November 1918 – July 1919) and the Greater Poland Uprising (December 1918 – February 1919).

The borders of the republic were extended to the East as the result of the Polish–Soviet War (May – October 1920), resulting from Semyon Budyonny's August 1920 military foray into former Russian Poland as far as Warsaw. The Soviets withdrew in panic during the 1920 major Polish counter-offensive. The newly re-established sovereign Poland created Wołyń Voivodeship as one of the 16 main administrative divisions of the country.

One of the biggest achievements of the regional government in Volhynia during the interwar period was the development of modern infrastructure. Around 1,000 school buildings were constructed from scratch, with considerable amount of state funds. In total, some 2,000 elementary schools opened and over a dozen high schools, employing 4,500 teachers.^{[p. 128]} The new projects in towns and cities – which were virtually abandoned by the imperial powers – included city halls and magistrates, post offices, state police buildings, financial institutions, hospitals, and health clinics. In 1928 the Lwów railway line via Stojanów was inaugurated. The roads were being paved on a massive scale. Around 1925 telephone and telegraph lines were built, connecting post offices across the entire voivodeship area, making possible also the wider distribution of the press.

=== September 1939 and its aftermath ===
On 17 September 1939, following German invasion of western Poland in accordance with the secret protocol of Molotov–Ribbentrop Pact, Soviet forces invaded eastern Poland. As the bulk of Polish Army was concentrated in the west fighting Nazi Germany, the Red Army met with limited resistance and their troops quickly moved westward, invading the Voivodeship’s area with considerable ease. They met with the invading Germans along the Curzon Line and held a joint victory parade.

Wołyń Voivodeship was overrun by the Wehrmacht in July 1941 during the German attack on the Soviet positions in eastern Poland. The draconian restrictions on Polish Jews were imposed in August 1941. The Lutsk Ghetto was set up in the capital by the German occupation authorities, and sealed from the outside in December 1941 with the provision of only starvation food rations. The Ghetto population was about 20,000 people. During a four-day period in mid August 1942 about 17,000 Jews were rounded up by Orpo and the Ukrainian Auxiliary Police, and taken in lorries along with women and children to the Górka Połonka forest. They were shot in waves into the prepared trenches.

In the years of 1942–1944 Volhynia was subject to genocide, conducted by paramilitary groups associated with the Organization of Ukrainian Nationalists (OUN), in particular, the Ukrainian Insurgent Army (UPA). These forces engaged in summary executions and massacres of the Polish population, along with the destruction of settlements. The razing of towns and villages would continue until August 1944. Władysław and Ewa Siemaszko estimate that around 60,000 Poles were massacred in the province. According to historian Professor Czesław Partacz (Historian and Lecturer at the Koszalinkiej Politechnic) the true figure of massacred Poles was between 134,000 and 150,000. Ukrainians who opposed the attacks on Poles were themselves targeted with similar aggression.

== Geography ==
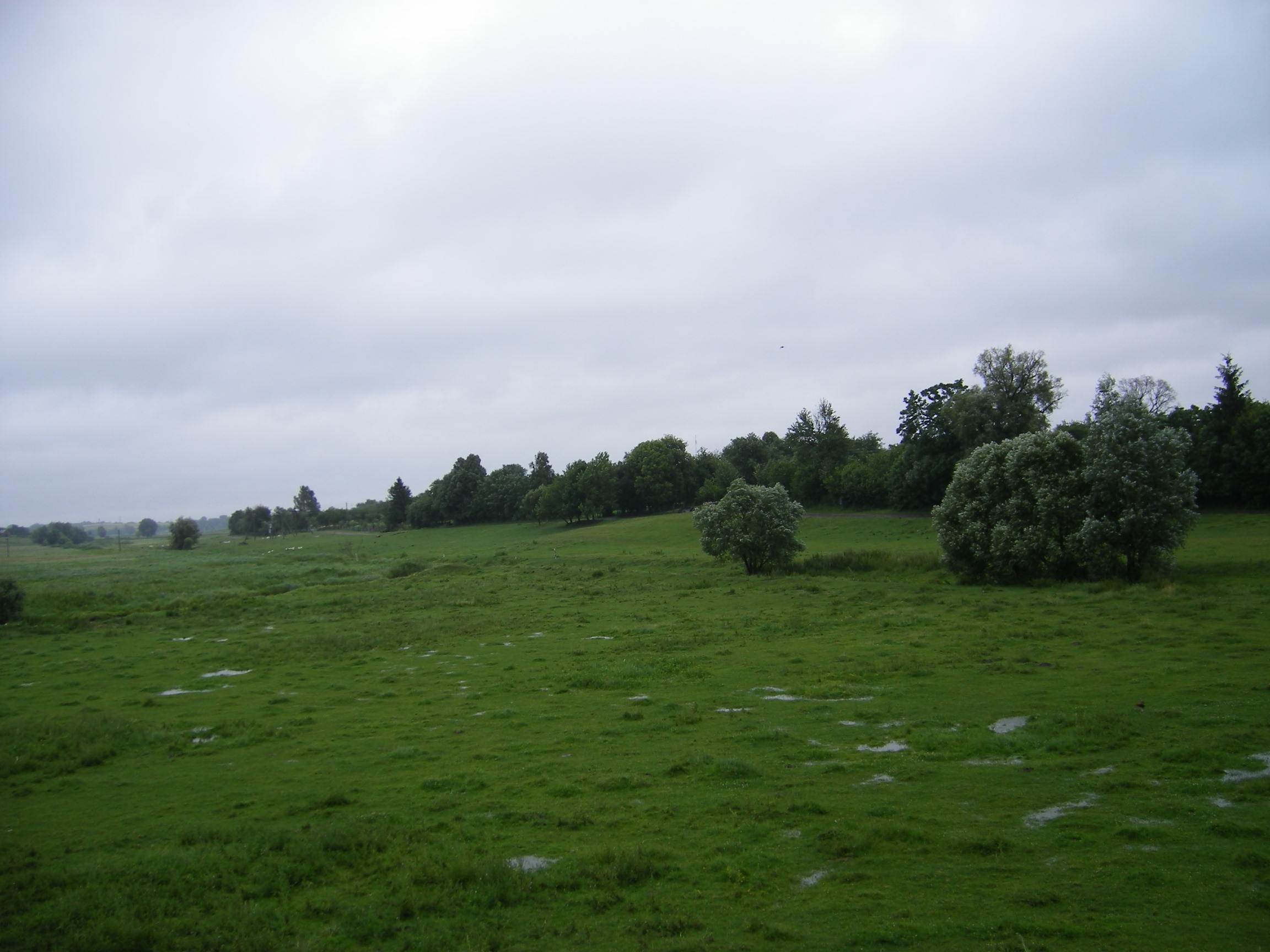
Horochów county, landscape

The Wołyń voivodeship was located at the south-eastern corner of Poland, bordering the Soviet Union to the east, the Lublin Voivodeship to the west, the Polesie Voivodeship to the north, and the Lwów and Tarnopol Voivodeships to the south. Initially, the Voivodeship’s area in the new Poland was 30,276 square kilometres. On 16 December 1930, Sarny County, comprising 5,478 km^{2} of land, was transferred from Polesie Voivodeship to the Wołyń Voivodeship. As a result, the total area of the Wołyń Voivodeship increased to 35,754 km^{2}, making it Poland's second largest province.

The landscape was flat and hilly for the most part. In the north, there was a flat strip of land called Volhynian Polesie, which extended some 200 kilometres from the Southern Bug river to the Polish-Soviet border. The landscape in the south was more hilly, especially in the extreme south-east corner around the historical town of Krzemieniec, in the Gologory mountains. The province's main rivers were the Styr, the Horyń, and the Słucz.

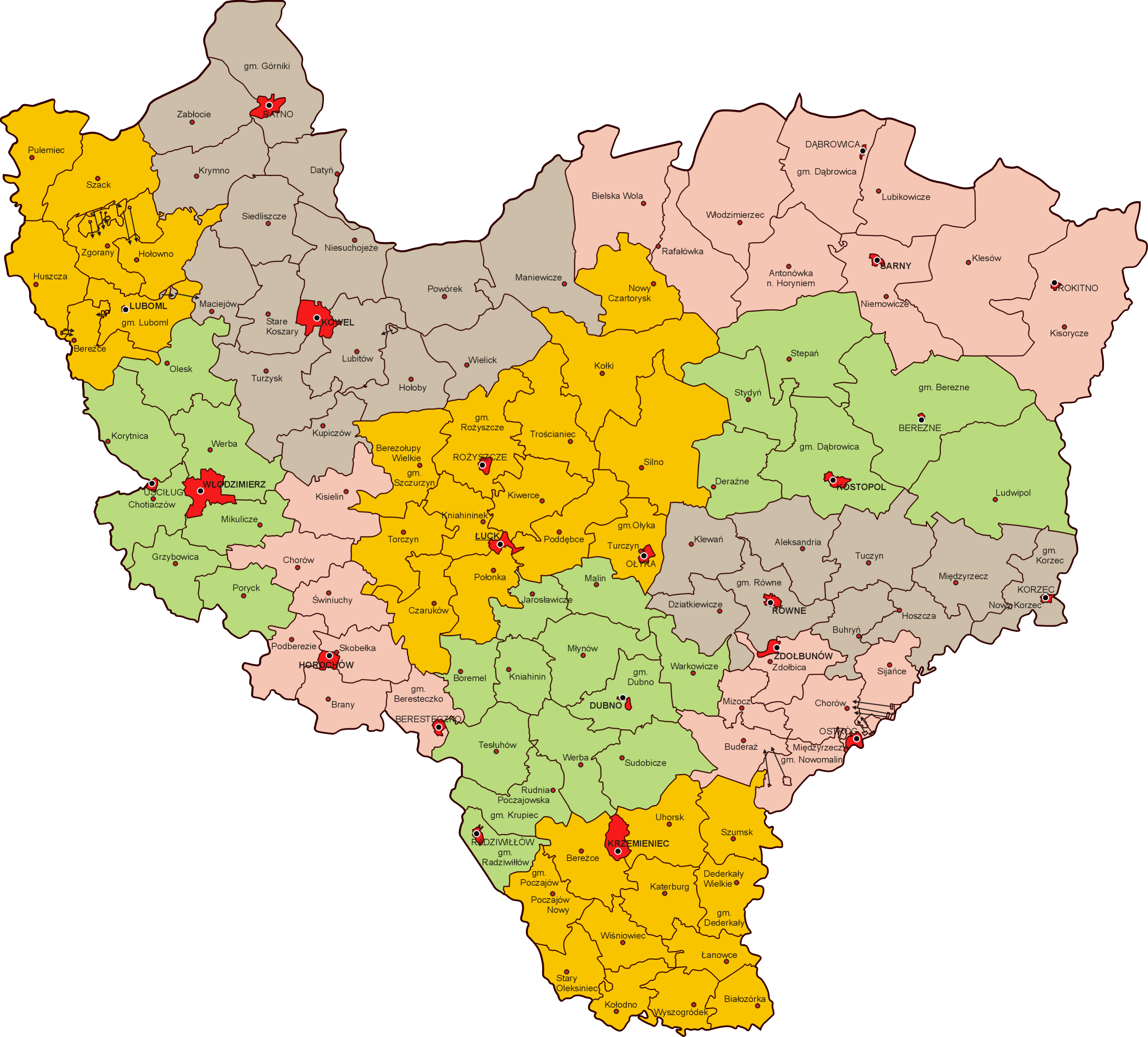
Map of the administrative division of the Voivodeship, 1938.

== Administrative divisions ==
The Wołyń Voivodeship was created formally on 19 February 1921. It was initially divided into the counties of Dubno, Horochow, Kowel, Krzemieniec, Luboml, Łuck, Ostróg, Równe and Włodzimierz Wołyński. On 1 January 1925 the gminas of Zdołbunów and Zdołbica of Równe county and gminas of Buderaż and Mizocz of Dubno one were passed to one of Ostróg. Center of Ostróg one was moved to Zdołbunów and was renamed as Zdołbunów one. Also gminas of Bereźne, Derażne, Kostopol, Ludwipol, Stepań and Stydyń were detached from county of Równe and one of Kostopol was formed. At same arrangements Majków gmina of Ostróg was passed to Równe one, Beresteczko gmina of Dubno one was passed to Horochow one, Ołyka gmina of Dubno one was passed to Łuck one, Radziwiłłów gmina of Krzemieniec was passed to Dubno one.

=== Counties ===
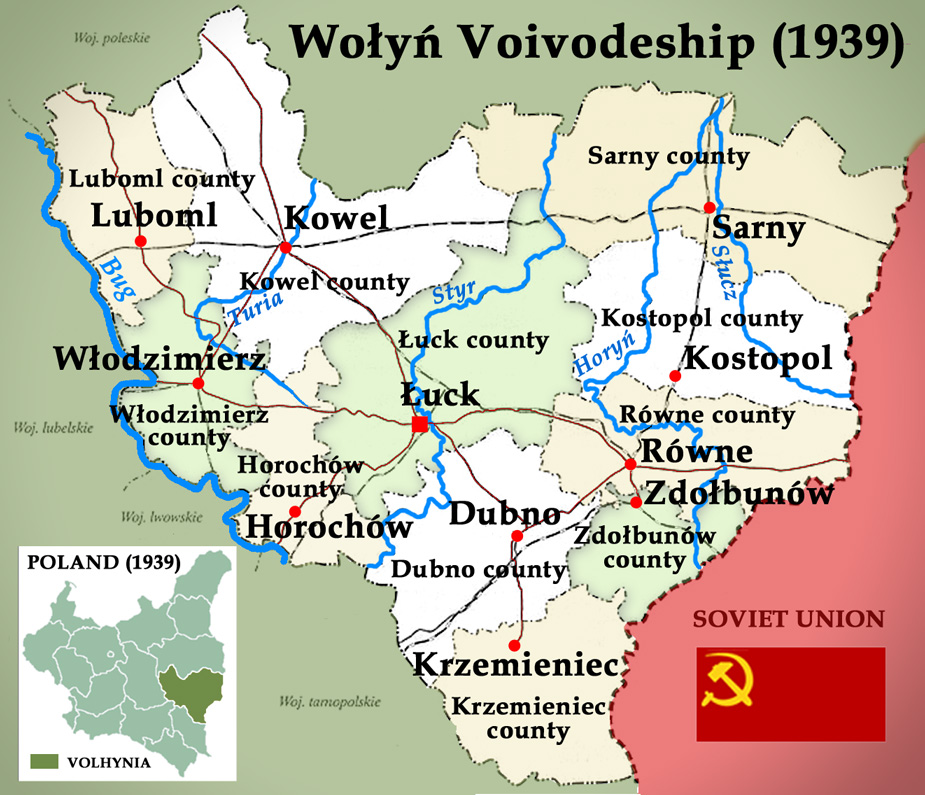

The capital, Łuck, had a population of around 35,600 (as of 1931). Other important centers of the Voivodeship were: Równe (in 1931 pop. 42,000), Kowel (pop. 29,100), Włodzimierz Wołyński (pop. 26,000), Krzemieniec (pop. 22,000), Dubno (pop. 15,300), Ostróg (pop. 13,400) and Zdołbunów (pop. 10,200).

List of Counties with square area and population
#	Name	CoA	Area	Population
1	Kowel county		5,682 km^{2}	255,100
2	Sarny county (since 1930)		5,478 km^{2}	181,300
3	Łuck county		4,767 km^{2}	290,800
4	Kostopol county		3,496 km^{2}	159,600
5	Dubno county		3,275 km^{2}	226,700
6	Równe county		2,898 km^{2}	252,800
7	Krzemieniec county		2,790 km^{2}	243,000
8	Włodzimierz Wołyński county		2,208 km^{2}	150,400
9	Luboml county		2,054 km^{2}	85,500
10	Horochów county		1,757 km^{2}	122,100
11	Zdołbunów county		1,349 km^{2}	118,300

== Demographics ==
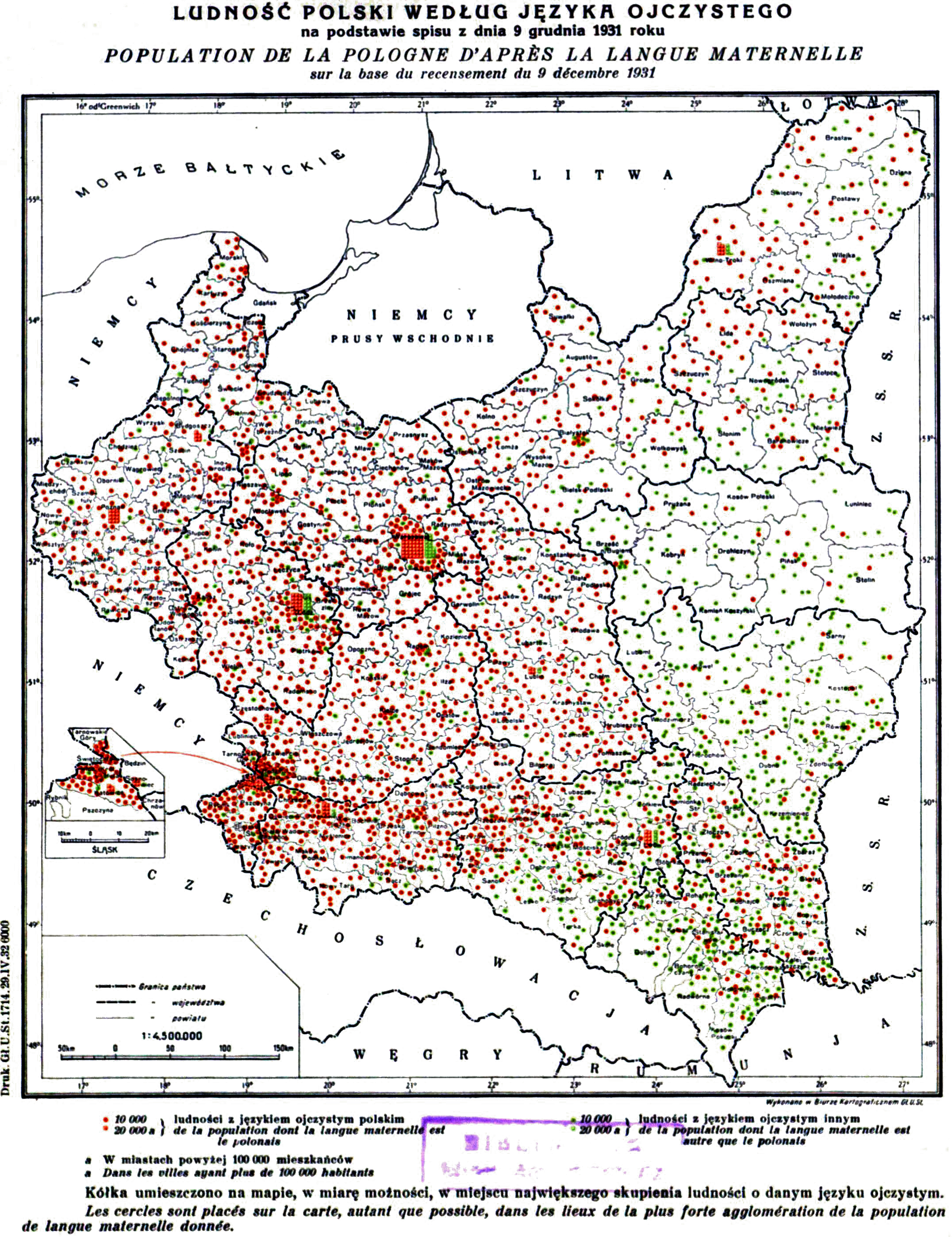
Mother tongue in Poland, based on the original 1931 Polish census

The capital of the Wołyń Voivodeship was Lutsk, Volhynia (now in Ukraine). It consisted of 11 powiats (counties), 22 larger towns, 103 villages and literally thousands of smaller communities and khutors (Polish: futory, kolonie), with clusters of farms unable to offer any form of resistance against future military attacks. In 1921 Wołyń Province was inhabited by 1,437,569 people, and the population density was 47.5 persons per km^{2}. By 1931 the population had grown to 2,085,600, and the density to 58 persons per km^{2}. According to the Polish census of 1931, the Ukrainian language was spoken by 1,418,324 inhabitants (68.0%), Polish by 346,640 (16.6%), Yiddish by 174,157 (8.3%), Hebrew by 31,388 (1.5%), German by 46,883 (2.2%), Czech by 30,977 (1.5%), Russian by 23,387 (1.1%), Ruthenian by 8,548 (0.4%), and Belarusian by 2,417 (0.1%).

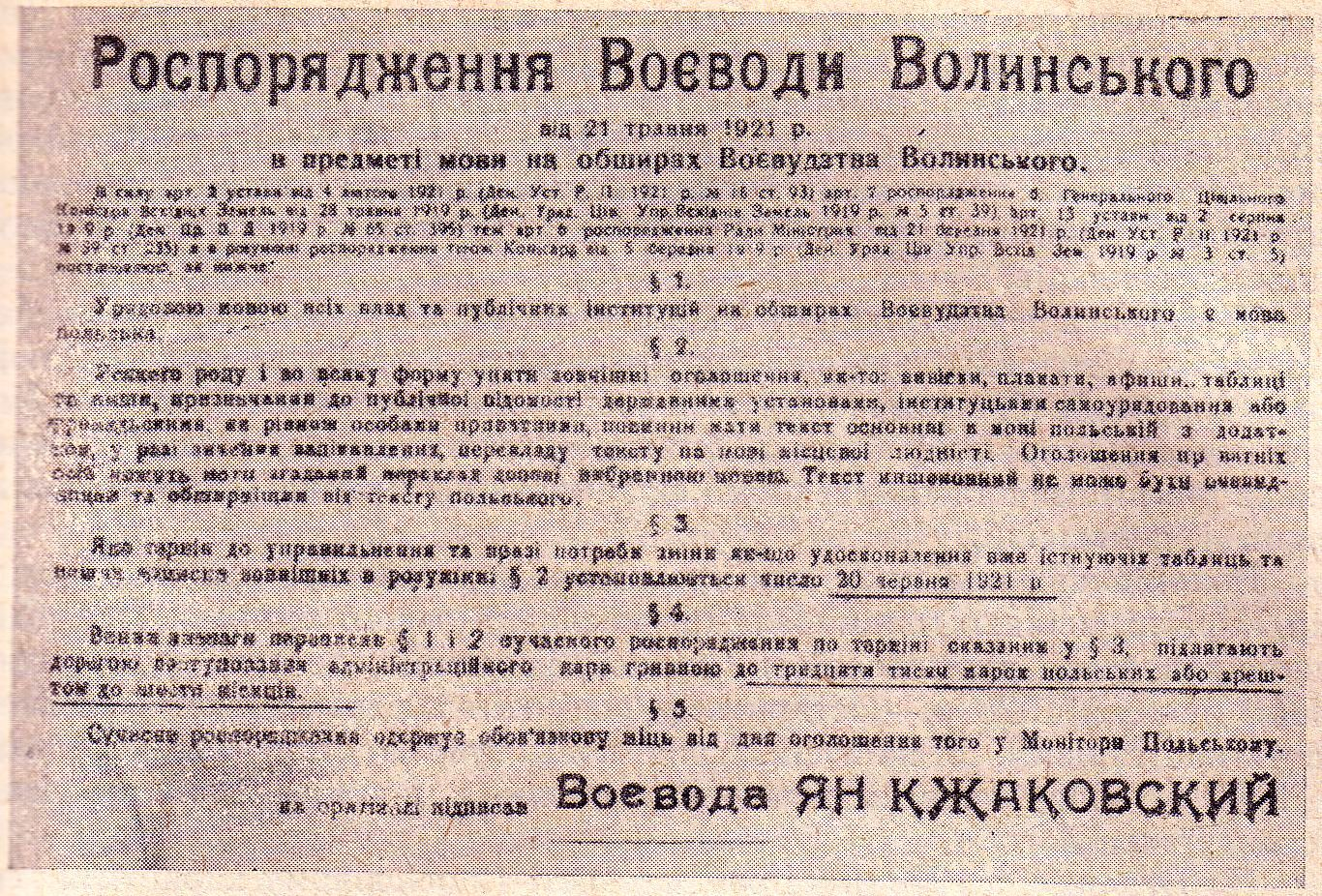
Sign pronouncing Polish as the official language in the Province in accordance with the 1921 Treaty of Riga which ended the Polish–Soviet War. Copy written in Ukrainian

The primary religions practised in the area were Eastern Orthodox Christian (69.8%), Roman Catholic (15.7%) as well Judaism by the Jews (10%), Protestantism (2.6%) and the Islamic faith by the Tatars. With respect to the Orthodox Ukrainian population in eastern Poland, the Polish government initially issued a decree defending the rights of the Orthodox minorities. In practice, this often failed, as the Catholics, also eager to strengthen their position, had official representation in the Sejm and the courts. With time, some 190 Orthodox churches were destroyed or disassembled (many of them already abandoned), and 150 more were transformed into Roman Catholic churches. Such actions were condemned by the head of the Ukrainian Greek Catholic Church, metropolitan Andrei Sheptytsky, who claimed that these acts would "destroy in the souls of our non-united Orthodox brothers the very thought of any possible reunion."

The land reform designed to favour the Poles in mostly Ukrainian populated Volhynia, the agricultural territory where the land question was especially severe, created alienation from the Polish state of even the Orthodox Volhynian population who tended to be much less radical than the Greek Catholic Galicians.

The results of the 1931 census (questions about mother tongue and about religion) are presented in the table below:

Comparison of Polish and Ukrainian population of Wołyń Voivodeship according to the 1931 census
County Polish name	County	Pop.	Polish	%	Ukrainian & Ruthenian	%	Roman Catholic	%	Orthodox & Uniate	%
Dubno	Dubno	226709	33987	15.0%	158173	69.8%	27638	12.2%	173512	76.5%
Horochów	Horokhiv	122045	21100	17.3%	84224	69.0%	17675	14.5%	87333	71.6%
Kostopol	Kostopil	159602	34951	21.9%	105346	66.0%	34450	21.6%	103912	65.1%
Kowel	Kovel	255095	36720	14.4%	185240	72.6%	35191	13.8%	187717	73.6%
Krzemieniec	Kremenets	243032	25758	10.6%	196000	80.6%	25082	10.3%	195233	80.3%
Luboml	Liuboml	85507	12150	14.2%	65906	77.1%	10998	12.9%	65685	76.8%
Łuck	Lutsk	290805	56446	19.4%	172038	59.2%	55802	19.2%	177377	61.0%
Równe	Rivne	252787	36990	14.6%	160484	63.5%	36444	14.4%	166970	66.1%
Sarny	Sarny	181284	30426	16.8%	129637	71.5%	28192	15.6%	132691	73.2%
Włodzimierz	Volodymyr	150374	40286	26.8%	88174	58.6%	38483	25.6%	89641	59.6%
Zdołbunów	Zdolbuniv	118334	17826	15.1%	81650	69.0%	17901	15.1%	86948	73.5%
Województwo Wołyńskie	Wołyń Voivodeship	2085574	346640	16.6%	1426872	68.4%	327856	15.7%	1467019	70.3%

== Industry and infrastructure ==
The Wołyń Voivodeship was located in the so-called Poland "B". The bulk of its population, especially the rural areas, was poor. Forest covered 23.7% of the province (as of 1937). Decades of Russian imperial rule had left Volhynia in a state of economic catalepsy, but the agricultural output following the rebirth of Poland quickly grew.

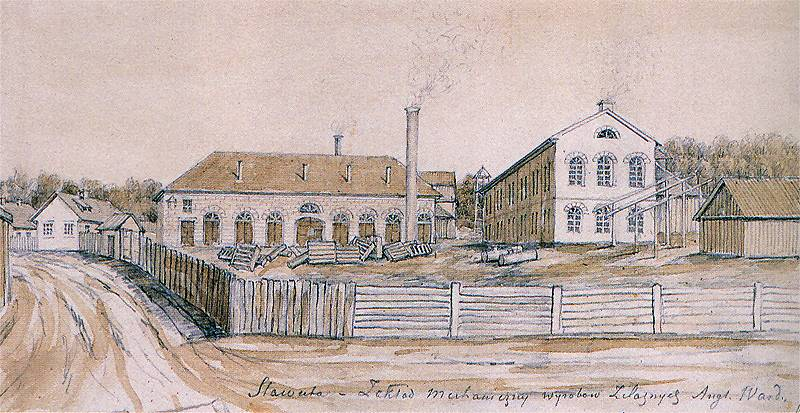
Ironworks in Sławuta (est. 1840), run and owned by the LRL firm of Warsaw before the Polish–Soviet War.

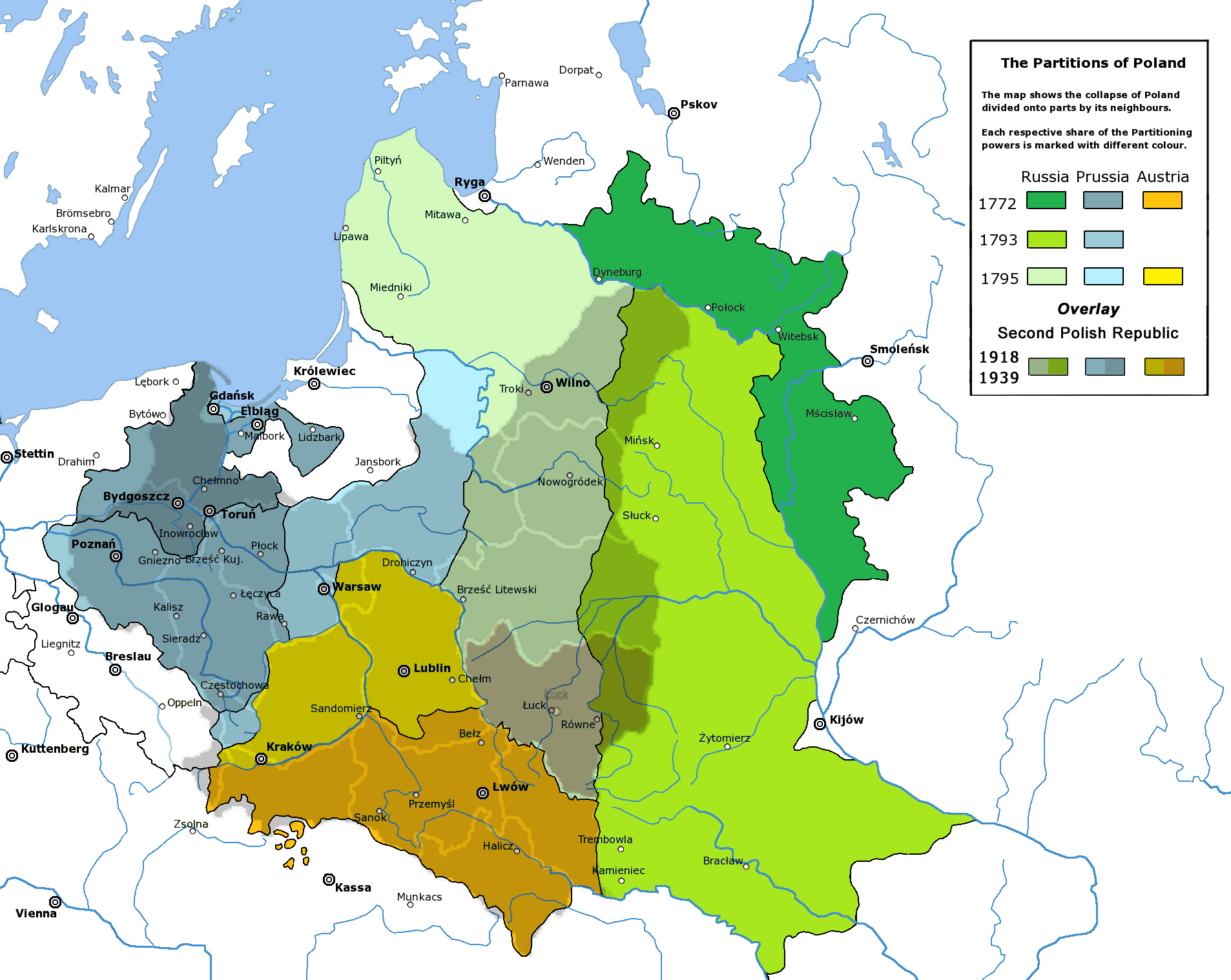
Wołyń Voivodeship in dark burgundy within the Second Polish Republic in dark grey, in relation to a base map of the Partitioned Poland. At the Treaty of Brest-Litovsk, acting on behalf of its constituent republics Bolshevik Russia defaulted on all Imperial Russia's commitments to the Triple Entente alliance.

The introduction of modern farming practices brought about a dozen-fold increase in wheat production between 1922/23 and 1936/37. By 1937, the voivodeship was home to 760 factories, employing 16,555 workers. Mining, forestry, and food production provided employment for 14,206 persons. Workers laid-off from industrial plants were also the most likely to start new businesses. In terms of ethnic composition among new business owners, 72,6% were Jewish, 24% Ukrainian, and 23% Polish. The province went through a recession in 1938/39. The tensions between Jewish and Ukrainian shopkeepers increased greatly after the introduction of cooperative stores, which undermined Jewish-run private enterprises. The Jewish business owners were chased out of some 3,000 Ukrainian villages by 1929, with the emerging Ukrainian drive toward economic self-sustainability via cooperatives accompanying their new political aspirations. The situation was much better among the ethnic Czechs and Germans, whose farms were highly efficient.

The railway network was thin, with only a few hubs, the most important at Kowel, with lesser ones at Zdołbunów, Równe and Włodzimierz. The total length of railways within the voivodeship was 1,211 km – just 3.4 km per 100 square kilometres. This was the result of decades of Russian exploitative economics.

In 1938, Polish government began a program of electrification of Volhynia. By spring of 1939, a 30,000 volt power plant was built in Krzemieniec, which provided light and electricity for towns and villages five counties. Other power plants were not completed, due to the Invasion of Poland. The annual Volhynian Trade Fair (1929–1938), which took place in Równe, was regarded as one of the most important regional fairs of Poland. In 1939, the fair was planned to take place on September 15–25.

== Education ==
Prior to 1917 illiteracy was rife in Volhynia. The Russian Empire maintained only 14 secondary schools in the entire province. Under the restored Polish republic, the number of public schools greatly increased: by 1930, there were already 1,371 schools, growing in numbers to 1,934 by 1938. Illiteracy lingered and according to the 1931 census, as much as 47.8% of the Volhynian population were still illiterate, compared with the national average of 23.1% for the whole of Poland (by early 1939, illiteracy in Volhynia was further reduced to 45%). In order to fight illiteracy, Volhynian authorities organized a network of the so-called moving libraries, which in 1939 consisted of 300 vehicles and 25,000 volumes.

The percentage of pupils in Ukrainian–language–only schools fell from 2.5% in 1929/1930 to 1.2% in 1934/35. Polish government of Ignacy Mościcki, in its 1935 April Constitution of Poland (Chapter 1), redefined the concept of state as home to all faiths and cultures (as opposed to a Polish "nation"), thus reducing the political impact, among others, of Ukrainian nationalism. Senators representing the German and Ukrainian minorities voted in Senat against the new changes, which were nevertheless passed on 16 January 1935.

== Voivodes ==
- Stanisław Jan Krzakowski, 14 March 1921 – 7 July 1921
- Tadeusz Łada, 7 July 1921 – 12 August 1921 (acting)
- Stanisław Downarowicz, 13 August 1921 – 19 August 1921
- Tadeusz Dworakowski, 10 October 1921 – 15 March 1922 (acting)
- Mieczysław Mickiewicz, 22 February 1922 – 1 February 1923
- Stanisław Srokowski, 1 February 1923 – 29 August 1924
- Bolesław Olszewski, 29 August 1924 – 4 February 1925
- Aleksander Dębski, 4 February 1925 – 28 August 1926
- Władysław Mech, 28 August 1926 – 9 July 1928
- Henryk Józewski, 9 July 1928 – 29 December 1929
- Józef Śleszyński, 13 January 1930 – 5 June 1930 (acting)
- Henryk Józewski, 5 June 1930 – 13 April 1938
- Aleksander Hauke-Nowak, 13 April 1938 – September 1939

== Bibliography ==
- Maly rocznik statystyczny 1939, Nakladem Glownego Urzedu Statystycznego, Warszawa 1939 (Concise Statistical Year-Book of Poland, Warsaw 1939).
