= Wołkowysk County =

POL powiat wołkowyski map

In the period between 1919 and 1939 Wołkowysk County was part of the Second Polish Republic. It was part of the Białystok Voivodeship and the seat of Gmina Biskupice.

Under the terms of the Molotov–Ribbentrop Pact, Poland was divided between the Soviet Union and Germany and was invaded by these countries in September 1939 (see Soviet invasion of Poland).

On October 22, 1939, less than two weeks after the invasion, the Soviet occupational administration organized elections. The Elections to the People's Assemblies of Western Ukraine and Western Belarus took place under control of NKVD and the Communist Party. On October 30 the National Assembly session held in Belastok passed the decision of joining the USSR and its unification with the Belarusian Soviet Socialist Republic. These petitions were officially accepted by the Supreme Soviet of the USSR on November 2 and by the Supreme Soviet of the BSSR on November 12. It became the Vawkavysk District of the Belastok Region of the BSSR.
