= Grodno County =

County of Poland

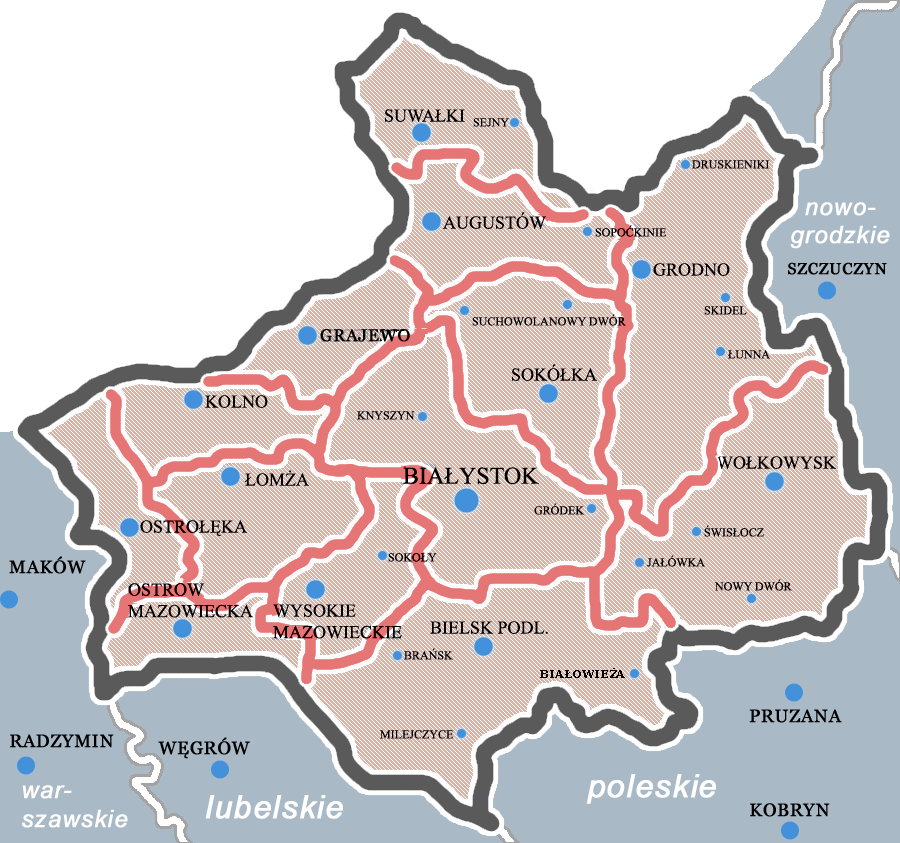
Counties of the Białystok Voivodeship from 1919–1921 and 1922–1939.

Grodno County was a county in the Northeast of Białystok Voivodeship of the Second Polish Republic.
