= Vladimir-Volynsky Uyezd =

County of Volyn province, Russian Empire

- Uezd
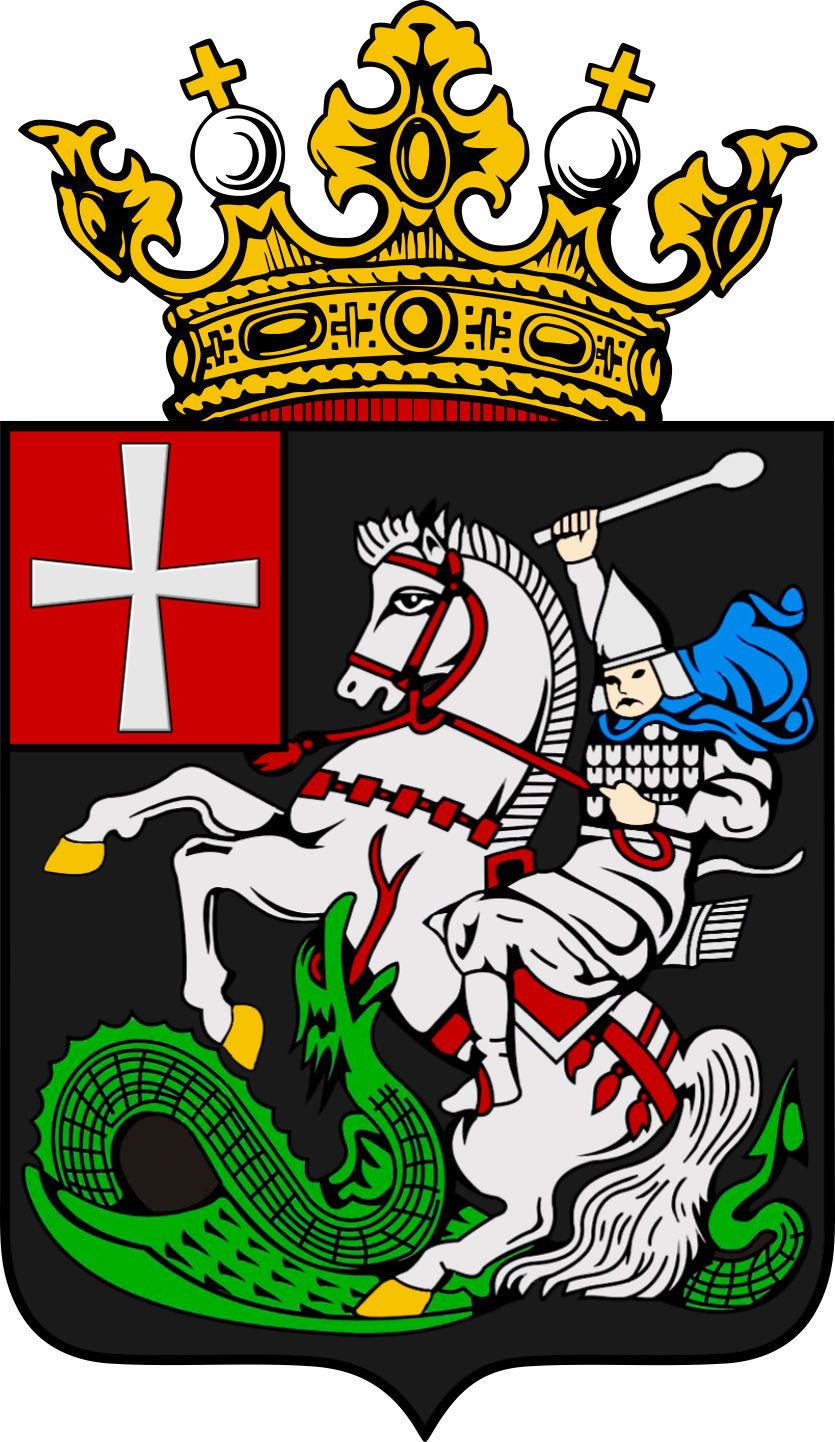
- Coat of arms

- Location in the Volhynian Governorate
- Country: Russian Empire
- Governorate: Poltava
- Established: 1781
- Abolished: 1923
- Capital: Volodymyr

Population (1897)
  - Total: 277,265

Vladimir-Volynsky Uyezd (Russian: Владимир-Волынский уезд) was an administrative subdivision (an uyezd) of Volhynian Governorate in the Russian Empire. It was created in 1795 as Vladimirsky Uyezd within Volhynian Viceroyalty soon after the annexation of eastern Poland by Russia. Its seat was located in Volodymyr (Vladimir-Volynsky).

The uyezd was located at the western end of the governorate. To its south and southwest it bordered the Kingdom of Galicia and Lodomeria of Austria-Hungary, to the west - Lublin Governorate of Congress Poland (Russian Empire), to the northwest the uyezd bordered Siedlce Governorate, to the north - Grodno Governorate. Its eastern borders were mutual with three other uyezds of the Volhynian Governorate - Kovelsky Uyezd (northeast), Lutsky Uyezd (east), Dubensky Uyezd - southeast.

The uyezd was subdivided into 23 volosts which were further subdivided into 337 obshchinas (communes).

== Demographics ==
At the time of the Russian Empire Census of 1897, Vladimir-Volynsky Uyezd had a population of 277,265. Of these, 72.1% spoke Ukrainian, 10.4% Yiddish, 8.4% Polish, 5.7% German, 2.8% Russian and 0.6% Czech as their native language.
