= Provisional Administration of the Front-line and Phase Territories =

Provisional Administration of the Front-line and Phase Territories Tymczasowy Zarząd Terenów Przyfrontowych i Etapowych (Polish)
- 1920
- Flag of Poland
- Status: Civil authority
- Official languages: Polish
- Chief Commissioner
  - 1920: Władysław Raczkiewicz
- Historical era: Interwar
Preceded by	Succeeded by
Civil Administration of the Eastern Lands; Civil Administration of the Lands of Volhynia and Podolian Front	Poland

The Provisional Administration of the Front-line and Phase Territories (Note: Polish: Tymczasowy Zarząd Terenów Przyfrontowych i Etapowych, abbr. TZTPiE) was a civil authority of the territories controlled by Second Polish Republic but not incorporated into the state itself, that was formed during the Polish–Soviet War in 1920. It was formed on 9 September 1920 replacing Civil Administration of the Eastern Lands and Civil Administration of the Lands of Volhynia and Podolian Front. On 20 December 1920, it was disestablished and its territories incorporated into Poland.

== History ==
Provisional Administration of Front-line and Phase Territories was established by Second Polish Republic on 9 September 1920, as a civil authority of the territories controlled but not incorporated into the state itself. The order to form it was given by the Commander-in-chief of the Polish Armed Forces. It was formed from Civil Administration of the Eastern Lands and Civil Administration of the Lands of Volhynia and Podolian Front. The territory was ruled by the Chief Commissioner Władysław Raczkiewicz. It was disestablished on 20 December 1920 by the decision of Council of Ministers from 27 November 1920. Its lands were incorporated into Poland.

== Bibliography ==
- Waldemar Kozyra. Polityka administracyjna władz polskich na Ziemiach Wschodnich Rzeczypospolitej Polskiej w latach 1918–1926. Białystok. 2005.
