= Civil authority =

Promotion of the state's law and order apart from the military

Civil authority or civil government is the practical implementation of a state on behalf of its citizens, other than through military units (martial law), that enforces law and order and that is distinguished from religious authority (for example, canon law) and secular authority. The enforcement of law and order is typically the role of the police in modern states.

== History ==
Among the first modern experiments in civil government took place in 1636 when Roger Williams, a Christian minister, founded the colony of Rhode Island and Providence Plantations. He sought to create a "wall of separation" between church and state to prevent corruption of the church and maintain civil order as expounded upon in his 1644 book, Bloudy Tenent of Persecution.

== Types of authority ==
Thus four forms of authority may be seen:

- Civil authority
- Military authority
- Religious authority (certain constitutions exclude the state having any religious authority, separation of church and state)
- Corporate authority (such as large business corporations with examples such as the former East India Company and Hudson's Bay Company)

It can also mean the moral power of command, supported (when need be) by physical coercion, which the State does not exercise over its members. In this view, because man can not live in isolation without being deprived of what makes him human, and because authority is necessary for a society to hold together, the authority has not only the power but the right to command. It is natural to man to live in society, to submit to authority, and to be governed by that custom of society which crystallizes into law, and the obedience that is required is paid to the powers that be, to the authority in possession. The extent of its authority is bound by the ends it has in view, and the extent to which it provides for the government of society.

In modern states enforcement of law and order is typically the role of the police although the line between military and civil units may be hard to distinguish; especially when militias and volunteers, such as yeomanry, act in pursuance of non-military, domestic objectives.

== See also ==
- Civilian control of the military
- Theocracy
- Military operations other than war
- Public administration
- Religious police
