= District (Poland) =

Administrative division in Poland

District (Note: Polish: Okręg, plural okręgi) is a term used in Poland, to denote regions and jurisdictions of various types, including electoral constituencies. As historical administrative subdivisions of Poland, districts existed in the later part of the Congress Poland period, from 1842, when the name was applied to the former countiess.

Districts were also created temporarily from 1945 to 1946, in the areas annexed to Poland from Germany as a result of the Soviet military advance. A district was then subdivided into obwody. These okręgi were later replaced by voivodeships, and the obwódy by counties.

== See also ==
- Okrug
