= Vilensky Uezd =

Uezd in Vilna Governorate, Russian Empire

Vilna uezd Виленскій уѣздъ
- Uezd
- Location in the Vilna Governorate
- Country: Russian Empire
- Krai: Northwestern
- Governorate: Vilna
- Established: 1795
- Abolished: 1920
- Capital: Vilna

Area
  - Total: 6,185.14 km^{2} (2,388.10 sq mi)

Population (1897)
  - Total: 363,313
  - Density: 58.7397/km^{2} (152.135/sq mi)
  - Urban: 42.53%
  - Rural: 57.47%

The Vilna uezd (Note: Russian: Ви́ленскій уѣ́здъ, romanized: Vílenskiy uyézd; Lithuanian: Vilniaus apskritis) was a county (uezd) of the Vilna Governorate of the Russian Empire, with the administrative centre in Vilna (which is in modern-day Vilnius). The uezd was bordered by the Sventsyany uezd to the east, the Oshmyany and Lida uezds to the south, the Troki uezd to the west, and the Vilkomir uezd of the Kovno Governorate to the north. The district covered the area of modern Vilnius County of Lithuania.

== History ==
A part of the Polish–Lithuanian Commonwealth, the Vilnius Voivodeship was annexed by the Russian Empire as a part of the Partitions of Poland. In 1796, the Lithuania Governorate was established, which included the Vilna uezd, and later became a part of the Litva-Vilna Governorate.

The Russian rule on Vilnius land came to an end ephemerally in 1915 when Imperial Germany established the Supreme Commander of All German Forces in the East, also known as Ober-Ost, followed by the Kingdom of Lithuania. After the Polish occupation, the Soviet authorities formally abolished it in 1924.

== Administrative divisions ==
The subcounties (volosts) of the Vilna uezd in 1912 were as follows:

Name	Name in Russian	Capital
Bystritsa volost	Быстрицкая волость	Bystritsa
Vornyany volost	Ворнянская волость	Vornyany
Gedroytsy volost	Гедройцкая волость	Gedroytsy
Gelvany volost	Гелванская волость	Gelvany
Ilyino volost	Ильинская волость	Ilyino
Malyaty volost	Малятская волость	Malyaty
Meyshagola volost	Мейшагольская волость	Meyshagola
Mitskuny volost	Мицкунская волость	Mitskuny
Musniki volost	Мусникская волость	Musniki
Nemenchin volost	Неменчинская волость	Nemenchin
Podberezye volost	Подберезская волость	Podberezye
Rudomino volost	Рудоминская волость	Rudomino
Rukoyni volost	Рукойнская волость	Rukoyni
Resha volost	Рѣшанская волость	Resha
Solechniki volost	Солечникская волость	Malye Solechniki
Shirvinty volost	Ширвинтская волость	Shirvinty
Shumsk volost	Шумская волость	Shumsk
Yanishki volost	Янишская волость	Yanishki

== Demographics ==
=== Russian Empire Census ===
At the time of the Russian Empire Census on 28 January [O.S. 15 January] 1897, the Vilna uezd had a population of 363,313 (with the city of Vilnius included), including 183,598 men and 179,915 women. The majority of the population indicated White Russian to be their mother tongue, which followed by Jewish, Lithuanian, and Polish speakers.

Linguistic composition of the Vilna uezd in 1897
Language	Native speakers	Percentage
Belarusian (Note: Prior to 1918, the Imperial Russian Government classified Russians as the Great Russians, Ukrainians as the Little Russians, and Belarusians as the White Russians. After the creation of the Ukrainian People's Republic in 1918, the Little Russians identified themselves as "Ukrainian". Also, the Belarusian Democratic Republic which the White Russians identified themselves as "Belarusian".)	93,896	25.84
Jewish	77,224	21.26
Lithuanian	76,030	20.93
Polish	73,088	20.12
Great Russian	37,906	10.43
German	2,844	0.78
Tatar	771	0.21
Little Russian	557	0.15
Latvian	211	0.06
Gypsy	15	0.00
Others	771	0.21
Total	363,313	100.00
