= Sventsyany uezd =

Subdivision of the Vilna Governorate of the Russian Empire

Coordinates: 55°08′00″N 26°09′20″E

Sventsyany uezd Свѣнцянскій уѣздъ
- Uezd
- Location in the Vilna Governorate
- Country: Russian Empire
- Krai: Northwestern
- Governorate: Vilna
- Established: 1795
- Abolished: 1920
- Capital: Sventsyany

Area
  - Total: 5,228.03 km^{2} (2,018.55 sq mi)

Population (1897)
  - Total: 172,231
  - Density: 32.9438/km^{2} (85.3240/sq mi)
  - Urban: 3.50%
  - Rural: 96.50%

The Sventsyany uezd, (Note: Russian: Свѣнця́нскій уѣ́здъ, romanized: Svyentsyánskiy uyézd; Lithuanian: Švenčionių apskritis; Belarusian: Свянця́нскі паве́т, romanized: Svianciánski paviét) known until 1842 as the Zavileisky uezd, (Note: Russian: Завиле́йскій уѣ́здъ, romanized: Zaviléyskiy uyézd; Lithuanian: Užnerio apskritis; Belarusian: Завіле́йскі паве́т, romanized: Zaviléjski paviét) was a county (uezd) of the Vilna Governorate of the Russian Empire.

The uezd was bordered by the Vilna uezd to the west, the Oshmyany uezd to the south, the Vileyka uezd to the east, the Disna uezd to the northeast, and the Novoaleksandrovsk uezd of the Kovno Governorate to the north. The administrative centre was located in Sventsyany (modern-day Švenčionys). The Sventsyany uezd included the most part of Švenčionys District and Pastavy District of Belarus.

== Demographics ==
At the time of the Russian Empire Census of 1897, Sventsyansky Uyezd had a population of 172,231. Of these, 47.5% spoke Belarusian, 33.8% Lithuanian, 7.1% Yiddish, 6.0% Polish, 5.4% Russian and 0.1% German as their native language.
