= Ieronim Uborevich =

Soviet general (1896–1937)

- Jeronimas Uborevičius
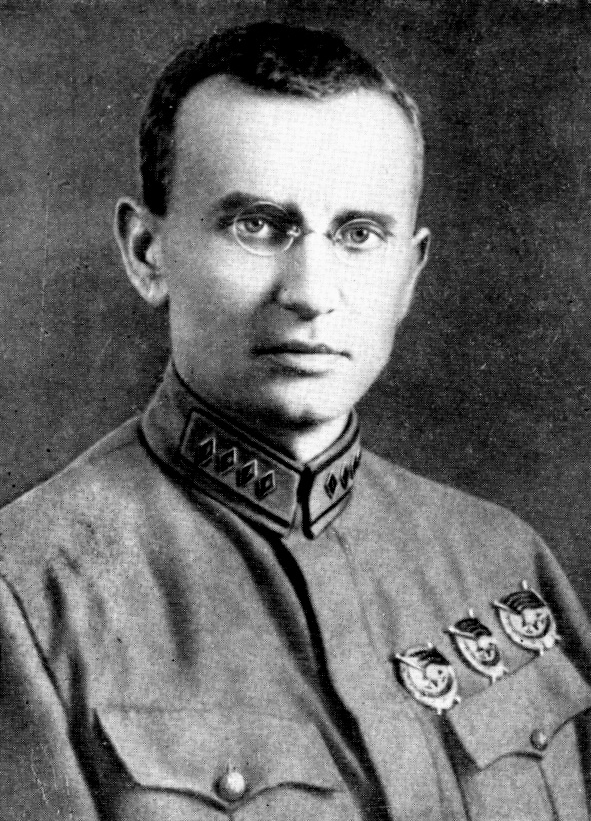
- Ieronim Uborevich
- Born: 14 January [O.S. 2 January] 1896; Antandraja, Novoalexandrovsky Uyezd, Kovno Governorate, Russian Empire
- Died: 12 June 1937 (aged 41); Moscow, Soviet Union
- Military career
- Allegiance: Russian Empire (1914–1917); Soviet Russia (1917–1922); Soviet Union (1922–1937)
- Service years: 1914–1937
- Rank: Komandarm 1st rank
- Commands: 18th Rifle Division; 14th Army; 9th Kuban Army; 13th Army; 5th Army; East Siberian Military District; Volga–Ural Military District; North Caucasus Military District; Moscow Military District; Belorussian Military District; Central Asian Military District
- Conflicts: World War I; Russian Civil War; Polish–Soviet War

Ieronim Petrovich Uborevich (Lithuanian: Jeronimas Uborevičius; Russian: Иерони́м Петро́вич Уборе́вич; 14 January [O.S. 2 January] 1896 – 12 June 1937) was a Soviet military commander of the Red Army during the Russian Civil War, reaching the rank of komandarm in 1935. He was executed during the Great Purge in June 1937 and was posthumously rehabilitated in 1957.

== Biography ==
Uborevich was born into a Lithuanian peasant family in the village of Antandraja in the Novoalexandrovsky Uyezd of the Kovno Governorate of the Russian Empire (present-day Utena District Municipality, Lithuania). After graduating from the Dvinsk (now Daugavpils) realschule, he attended the Saint Petersburg Polytechnical Institute before transferring in 1915 to the Constantine Artillery School in Petrograd, from which he graduated in 1916, receiving command of a battery, and later of a company.

He joined the Russian Social Democratic Labour Party (b) in March 1917 and, after the October Revolution of that year, began recruiting Red Guards in Bessarabia. During Operation Faustschlag in February or March 1918 he was injured and taken captive by the Imperial German Army. He escaped in July or August, joined the Red Army, and served as an artillery instructor and commander of the Dvinsk Brigade in the Red Army Northern Front. In December 1918 he received command of the 18th Rifle Division of the 6th Army.

During the Russian Civil War, he held several significant commands, including: commander of the 14th Army of the Southern Front and the Southwestern Front (6 October 1919 – 24 February 1920, 17 April – 7 July 1920, and 15 November – 15 December 1920); commander of the 9th Kuban Army of the Southern Front (1 March – 5 April 1920); commander of the 13th Army in the Southern Front (10 July – 11 November 1920); and commander of the 5th Army in the Eastern Front (27 August 1921 – 14 August 1922).

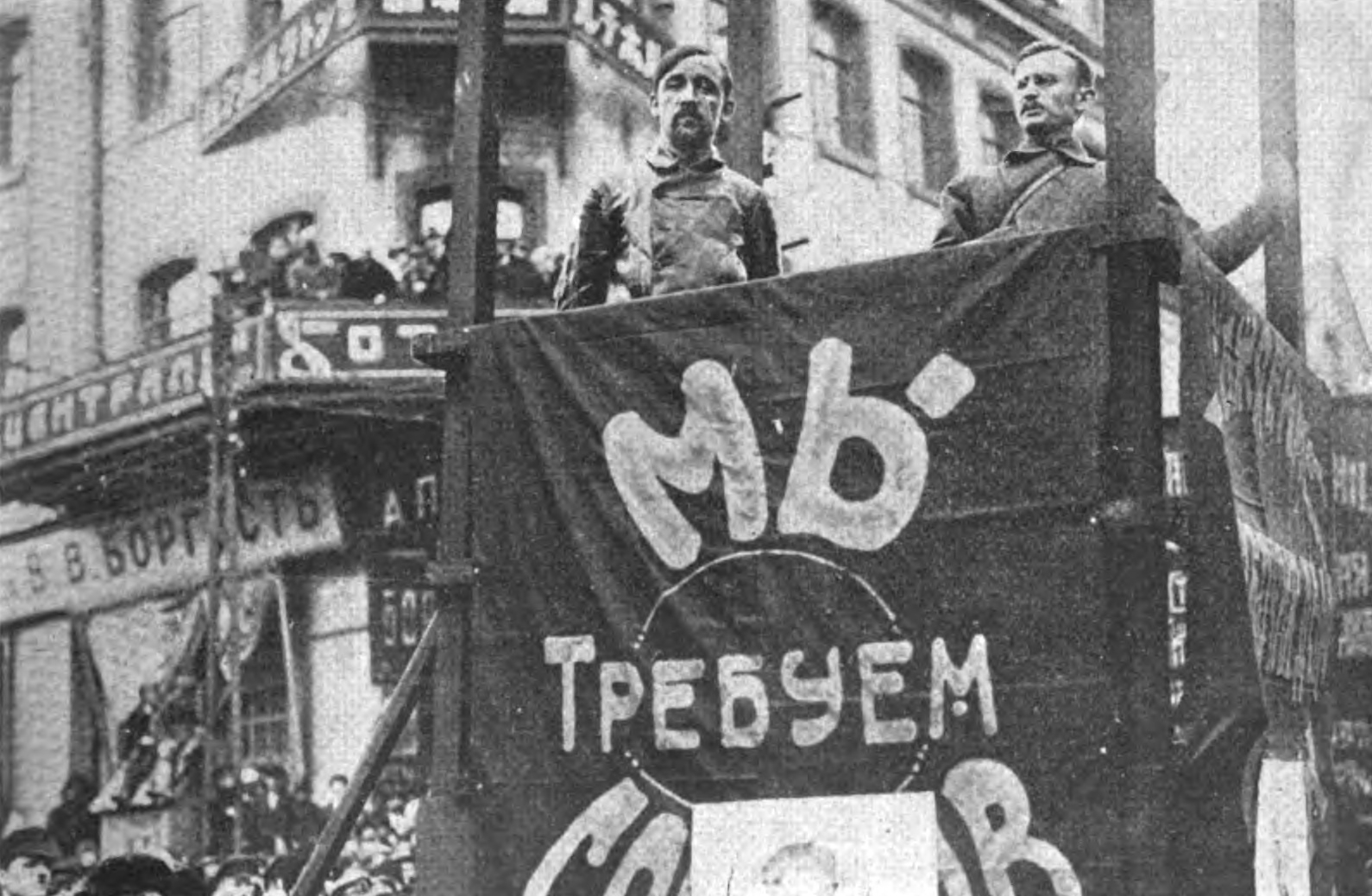
Uborevich (right) gives a speech in Vladivostok after the withdrawal of the Japanese, 1922

Besides combat against the Whites and (in 1920) against the Poles, he was also involved in the defeat of Nestor Makhno and Stanisław Bułak-Bałachowicz; he acted as assistant to Mikhail Tukhachevsky during the Tambov Rebellion in 1921–1922. From August to November 1922 he served as minister of war of the Far Eastern Republic and commander-in-chief of its People's Revolutionary Army. In the latter position, Uborevich oversaw the storming of Spassk-Dalny (in the present-day Primorsky Krai) on 9 October 1922, the seizure of Vladivostok from the White troops of Mikhail Diterikhs on 25 October 1922, and finally, the ouster from Primorsky Krai of the last major White forces in Russian territory, the Zemskaya Rat of Mikhail Diterikhs. From August to November he served in the Far Eastern Bureau of the Comintern.

Uborevich was a member of All-Russian Central Executive Committee from 1922 and consecutively, commander of a series of military districts: Ural (June 1924 – January 1925); North Caucasus (January 1925 – 1927); Moscow (1928 – 18 November 1929); Belorussia (April 1931 – 20 May 1937); and Central Asia (20–29 May 1937). He also attended the military academy of the German General Staff twice (1927–1928 and June 1933). He had a close relationship with his counterparts in the Reichswehr, acquiring important information on developments in German weaponry. He was also a member of the Soviet Revolutionary Military Council (June 1930 – June 1931) and chief of armaments for the Red Army (November 1929 – April 1931). He acted as a candidate member of the Central Committee of the All-Union Communist Party (Bolsheviks) from 1931 to 1937 and from 1934 was a member of the military council of the People's Commissariat of Defense of the Soviet Union.

Arrested on May 29, 1937, Uborevich – along with Tukhachevsky, August Kork, and others – was arraigned in the Case of the Trotskyist Anti-Soviet Military Organization on June 11, 1937. Judged guilty of espionage and sabotage by a clandestine military tribunal, he was sentenced to death and executed on the same day. During the Khrushchev Thaw he was posthumously rehabilitated by the Military Collegium of the Supreme Court of the Soviet Union on January 31, 1957.

Uborevich was survived by his wife Nina (née Maximova) and daughter Vladimira (Mira). Nina Uborevich was arrested in late 1937 and executed in 1941. Mira Uborevich was sent to an orphanage and later (in 1944) arrested and convicted. Her memoirs were published in 2008; in 2013 she was interviewed in a multi-part documentary for the Russia-K television channel.

== Sources ==
- Fitzpatrick, Sheila (2015). On Stalin's Team: The Years of Living Dangerously in Soviet Politics. Princeton, NJ: Princeton University Press. ISBN 9781400874217.
- Harrison, Richard (2010). Architect of Soviet Victory in World War II: The Life and Theories of G.S. Isserson. Jefferson, NC: McFarland & Company. ISBN 978-0-7864-4897-5.
- Smele, Jonathan (2015). Historical Dictionary of the Russian Civil Wars, 1916–1926. New York: Rowman & Littlefield. ISBN 978-1-4422-5281-3.
- Stoecker, Stacy (2018). Forging Stalin's Army: Marshal Tukhachevsky And The Politics Of Military Innovation. New York: Taylor & Francis. ISBN 978-0-8133-3735-7.
- Уборевич, Владимира (2008). 14 писем Елене Сергеевне Булгаковой. Москва: Время. ISBN 978-5969103436.
