= Disna uezd =

Uezd in Northwestern, Russian Empire

Disna uezd Дисненскій уѣздъ
- Uezd
- Location in the Vilna Governorate
- Country: Russian Empire
- Krai: Northwestern
- Governorate: Vilna
- Established: 1795
- Abolished: 1920
- Capital: Disna

Area
  - Total: 5,779.3 km^{2} (2,231.4 sq mi)

Population (1897)
  - Total: 204,923
  - Density: 35.458/km^{2} (91.836/sq mi)
  - Urban: 4.14%
  - Rural: 95.86%

The Disna uezd (Note: Russian: Ди́сненскій уѣ́здъ, romanized: Dísnenskiy uyézd; Lithuanian: Dysnos apskritis; Belarusian: Дзі́сенскі паве́т, romanized: Dzísienski paviét) was a county (uezd) of the Vilna Governorate of the Russian Empire. The uezd was bordered by the Dvinsk uezd of the Vitebsk Governorate to the north, the Minsk uezd of the Minsk Governorate to the east, the Vileyka uezd to the south, the Sventsyany uezd to the southwest, and the Novoaleksandrovsk uezd of the Kovno Governorate. The uezd was eponymously named for its administrative center, Disna, which was belonged to present-day Dizsna in Belarus. The territory of Disna uezd corresponds to a part of the present-day Miory, Hlybokaye, Sharkawshchyna, and Pastavy districts of Vitebsk Region.

== Demographics ==
At the time of the Russian Empire Census of 1897, Disnensky Uyezd had a population of 204,923. Of these, 81.1% spoke Belarusian, 10.1% Yiddish, 5.9% Russian, 2.4% Polish, 0.3% Lithuanian, 0.1% German and 0.1% Latvian as their native language.
