= Western Krai =

Unofficial region of the Russian Empire

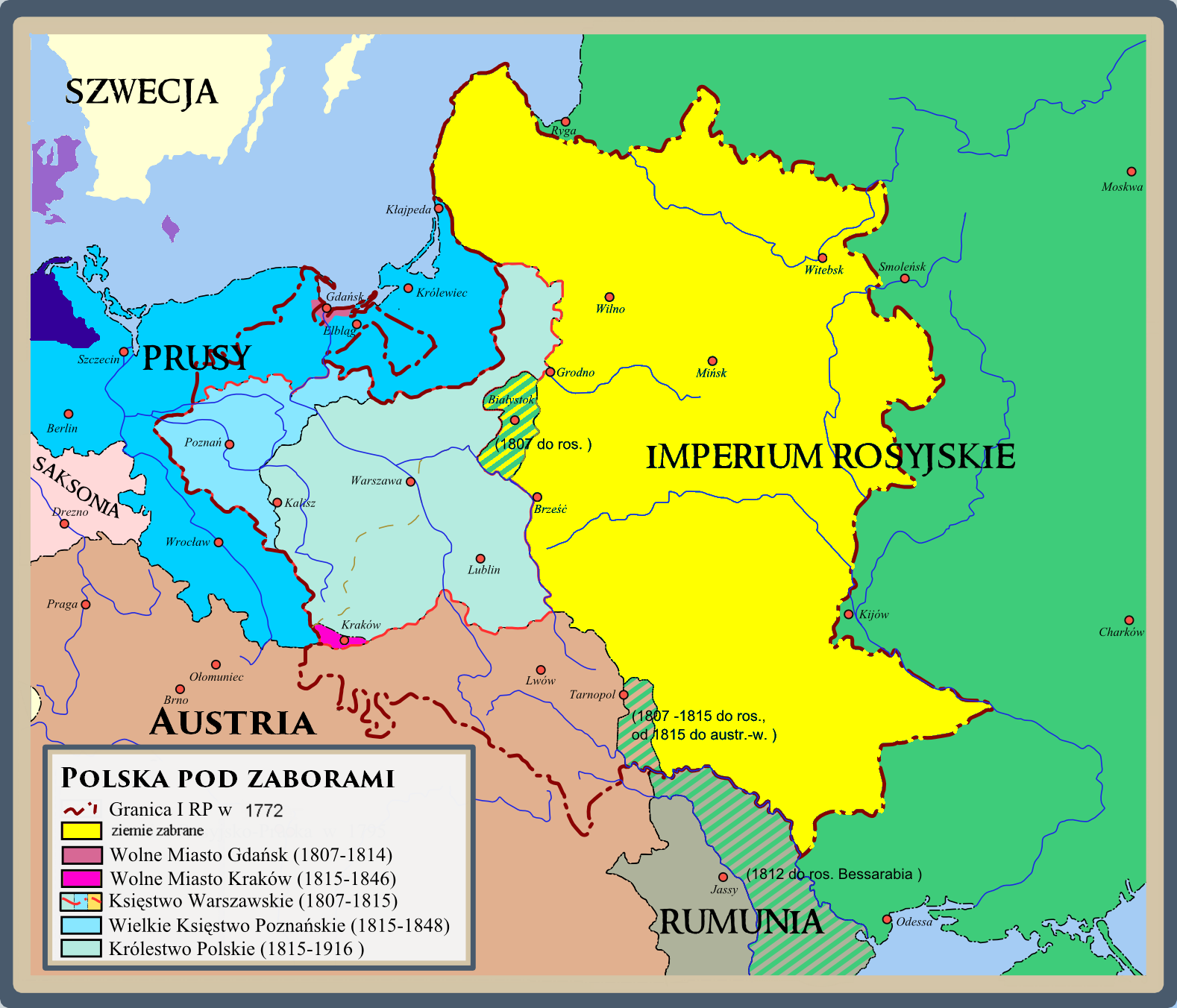
Taken lands (yellow)

Western Krai (Russian: Западный край, literally Western Land) was an unofficial name for the westernmost parts of the Russian Empire, excluding the territory of Congress Poland (which was sometimes referred to as Vistula Krai). The term encompasses the lands annexed by the Russian Empire in the successive partitions of the Polish–Lithuanian Commonwealth in the late 18th century – in 1772, 1793, 1795 and located east of Congress Poland. This area is known in Poland as Ziemie Zabrane (Taken Lands, Stolen Lands) but is most often referred to in Polish historiography and common parlance as part of Zabór Rosyjski (the Russian Take). Together with Bessarabia and the former Crimean Khanate, the territory roughly overlapped also with the Jewish Pale of Settlement of the Russian Empire, and included much of what is today Belarus, Ukraine, and Lithuania.

== Political geography ==
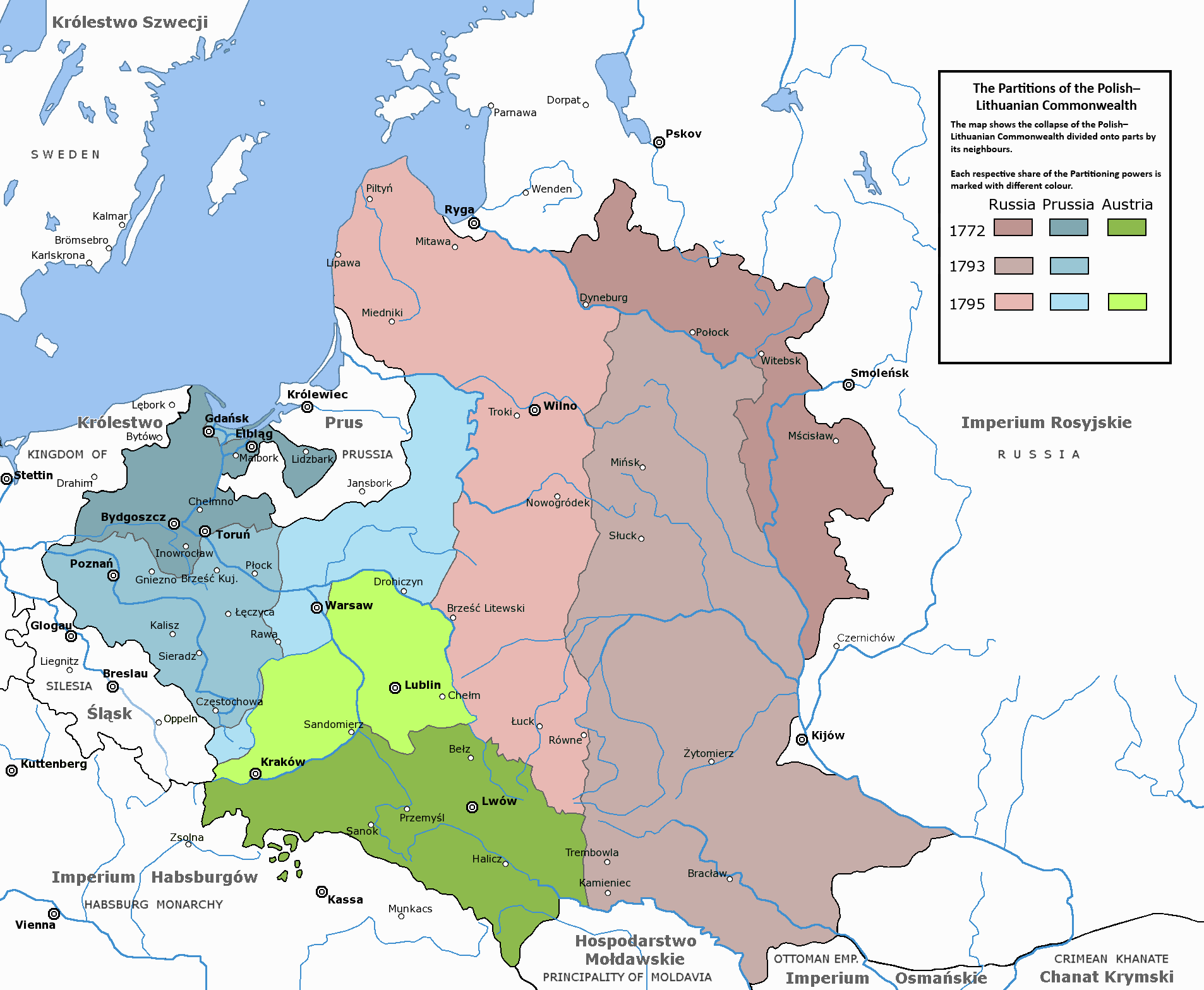
Three partitions of Poland

Western Krai was made of the following lands of the Polish–Lithuanian Commonwealth:

- from the First Partition of Poland (1772): Inflants (Latgale), northern part of the Polotsk Voivodeship, entire Mstsislaw Voivodeship and Vitebsk Voivodeship, and south eastern part of the Minsk Voivodeship (about 92,000. km^{2})
- from the Second Partition of Poland (1793): remaining part of the Minsk Voivodeship, the entire Kiev Voivodeship, Bracław Voivodeship and Vilnius Voivodeship, parts of Podole Voivodeship and eastern parts of the Wołyń Voivodeship and Brest Litovsk Voivodeship (about 250,000. km^{2})
- from the Third Partition of Poland (1795): all the territories east of the Bug River and (about 120,000. km^{2}) (after 1807, the Belostok Oblast)

It has never constituted one official administrative subdivision (Krai) of Russia but was a common name for two such subdivisions: Northwestern Krai and Southwestern Krai.

The territory consisted of nine governorates: six Lithuanian and Belarusian ones that constituted the Northwestern Krai (Vilna, Kovno, Grodno, Minsk, Mogilev and Vitebsk), which mostly coincided with the former Grand Duchy of Lithuania, and three Ukrainian ones that constituted the Southwestern Krai (Volhynian, Podolia and Kiev).

== History ==
Due to its national specifics, the Western Krai had some special laws and elements of government.

During the reign of Alexander I of Russia, Poles and Lithuanians prevailed in the western provinces. After 1819, Grodno, Vilnius (rus. Vilna, pol. Wilno), Minsk, Volhynia (pol. Wołyń), Podolia (pol. Podole) governorates and the Belostok Oblast remained under the chief administrative management of the Grand Duke Konstantin Pavlovich of Russia. All positions of the local administration were dominated by the Polish (pol. szlachta) and Lithuanian nobility, which had there a wide local government and enjoyed many social, economic and military privileges, unlike noble families in the so-called Congress Poland. This opportune situation changed dramatically as the November Uprising and later the January Uprising had broken out in 1830 and 1863 respectively and both failed in effort to restore an independent state which would have been a kind of successor to the Polish–Lithuanian Commonwealth.

With the fall of the Russian Empire and the end of World War I, Western Krai territories became a scene of military and political rivalry between emerging nations of Eastern Europe, the expanding Soviet Union and the Polish state reborn as the Second Polish Republic. The Treaty of Riga laid the end to this rivalry in 1921. Although borders were set as a compromise between political stability and national aspirations, none of the sides of the treaty were satisfied. In the new political situation of Europe in the beginning of the 20th century, the Polish–Lithuanian Commonwealth had no chance of being successfully restored. Marshal Józef Piłsudski, however, seeking to revive the cultural and political heritage of the Commonwealth, continued for some time to pursue his (ultimately unsuccessful) plan for the creation of a federation of Central and Eastern European countries, called Intermarium (Międzymorze).

== See also ==
- Pale of Settlement
- Privislinsky Krai
- Western Oblast (1917–18)
- Kresy
