= Troki uezd =

Subdivision in Vilna Governorate, Russian Empire

Coordinates: 54°38′0″N 24°56′0″E

Troki uezd Трокскій уѣздъ
- Uezd
- Location in the Vilna Governorate
- Country: Russian Empire
- Krai: Northwestern
- Governorate: Vilna
- Established: 1795
- Abolished: 1920
- Capital: Troki

Area
  - Total: 5,151 km^{2} (1,989 sq mi)

Population (1897)
  - Total: 203,401
  - Density: 39.49/km^{2} (102.3/sq mi)
  - Urban: 1.59%
  - Rural: 98.41%

The Troki uezd (Note: Russian: Тро́кскій уѣ́здъ, romanized: Trókskiy uyézd; Lithuanian: Trakų apskritis) was a county (uezd) of the Vilna Governorate of the Russian Empire. The uezd was bordered by the Mariampol, Kalvariya, and the Seyny uezds of the Suwałki Governorate to the west, the Lida uezd to the south, the Vilna uezd to the east, and the Kovno uezd of the Kovno Governorate to the north. The administrative centre of the county was the city of Troki (present-day Trakai). The area included most of the modern Trakai, Elektrėnai districts of Vilnius County, and Varėna, Šalčininkai districts of Alytus County, as well as part of Kaišiadorys, Alytus, and Prienai districts.

== Demographics ==
At the time of the Russian Empire Census of 1897, Troksky Uyezd had a population of 203,401. Of these, 58.1% spoke Lithuanian, 15.7% Belarusian, 11.3% Polish, 9.5% Yiddish, 4.6% Russian, 0.4% Tatar, 0.2% German and 0.1% Ukrainian as their native language.
