= Bułak-Bałachowicz =

Bułak-Bałachowicz was the surname of two brothers, generals of the Russian and then the Polish Army:

- Stanisław Bułak-Bałachowicz (1883–1940)
- Józef Bułak-Bałachowicz (1894–1923)
