= Byarozawka =

Byarozawka Бярозаўка (Belarusian) Берёзовка (Russian)
- Town
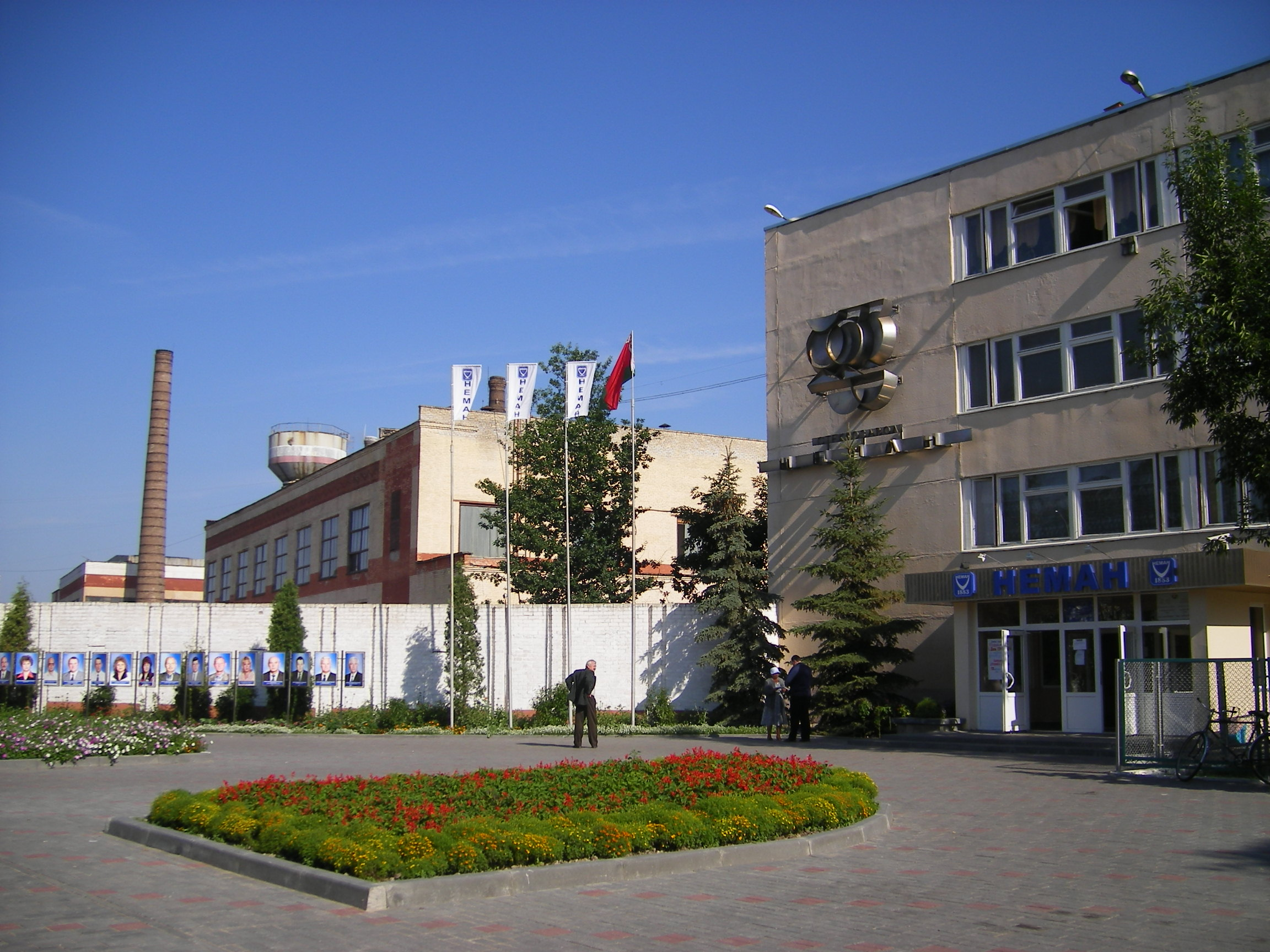

- Flag Coat of arms

- Location within Belarus
- Coordinates: 53°43′N 25°30′E
- Country: Belarus
- Region: Grodno Region
- District: Lida District
- Elevation: 130 m (430 ft)

Population (2025)
  - Total: 9,395
- Time zone: UTC+3 (MSK)
- Postal Code: 231306
- Area code: +375 1561

Byarozawka or Beryozovka (Belarusian: Бярозаўка, romanized: Biarozaŭka; Russian: Берёзовка; Polish: Brzozówka) is a town in Lida District, Grodno Region, Belarus. It is situated along the Neman River. As of 2025, it has a population of 9,395.

== Demographics ==
Historical population
Year	Pop.
1921	604
2015	10,533
2023	9,657
2024	9,521

According to the 1921 Polish census, the population was 69.9% Polish and 24.8% Belarusian.

== Notable people ==
- Czesław Michniewicz (born 1970), Polish football manager
