= Vladimira Uborevich =

Russian architect and memoir author (1924–2020)

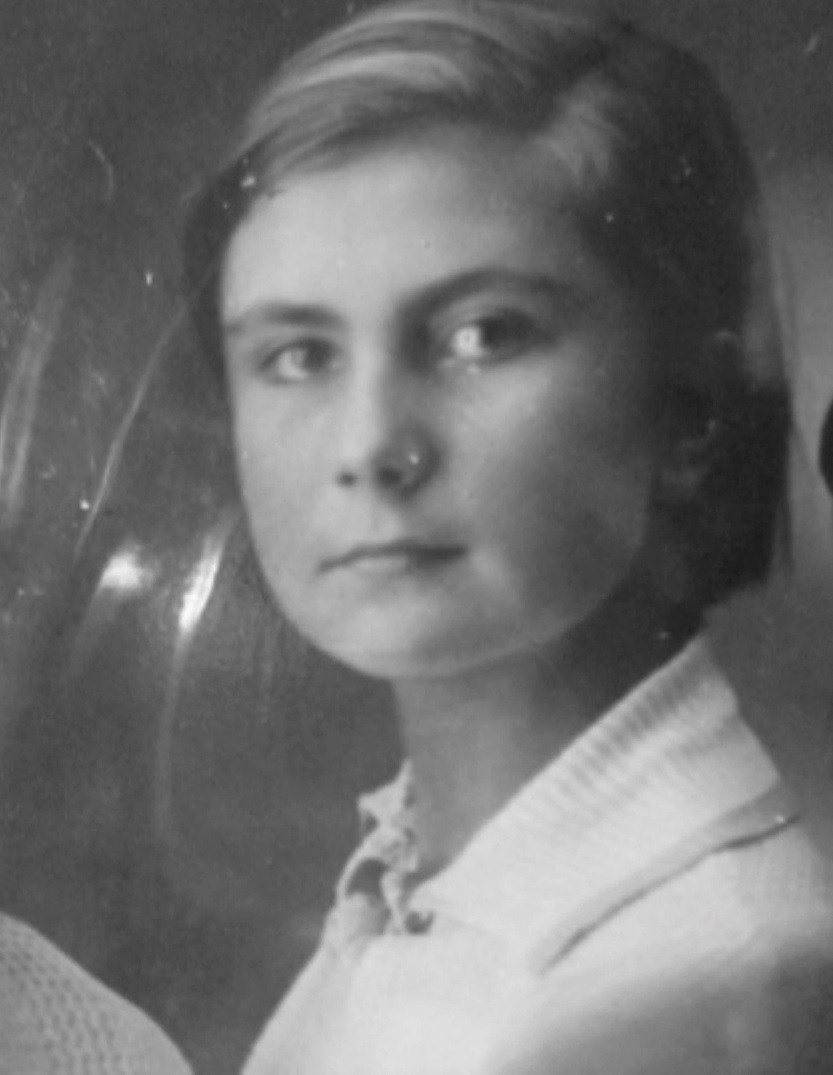
- Vladimira Uborevich in 1937
- Born: Vladimira (Mira) Ieronimowna Uborevich; February 14, 1924; Chita, USSR
- Died: February 21, 2020 (aged 96); Moscow, Russian Federation
- Occupations: memoirist, architect
- Spouse: Oleg Borovsky
- Children: Boris Uborevich-Borovsky, Vladimir Uborevich-Borovsky

Vladimira (Mira) Ieronimowna Uborevich (Владимира Иеронимовна Уборевич, 14 February 1924, Chita - 21 February 2020, Moscow) was a Russian architect and author of memoirs, describing her experiences as a child of an enemy of the people.

== Biography ==
In 1930, her family moved to Moscow. In 1937, her father Ieronim Uborevich, a prominent Soviet military commander, was arrested and executed, together with Mikhail Tukhachevsky, Iona Yakir and August Kork. She was a friend of Mikhail Bulgakov's wife, Elena Sergeevna Bulgakova.

The family was exiled to Astrakhan. Vladimira grew up in an orphanage in Sverdlovsk, but started to live with her mother's friend, Elena Bulgakova, after her mother was shot for being the wife of an enemy of the people in 1941. She studied at the Moscow Architectural Institute.

In 1944, Mira was arrested for being the daughter of an enemy of the people and convicted five years to the Vorkutlag camp. She was rehabilitated, and graduated from Moscow State University of Civil Engineering. She then worked at the Zentromasch factory.

During the 1960s, following the advice of Elena Bulgakova, she wrote a number of letters about her childhood and later experiences.

In January 2013, a multi-part documentary program about her by Vladimir Meletin was shown on Russia-K.

== Works ==
- 14 писем Елене Сергеевне Булгаковой / 14 pisem Elene Sergeevne Bulgakovoĭ Время, Moskva : Vremi︠a︡, 2008.
