= Ukmergė County =

Historical subdivision in the Kovno Governate, Lithuania

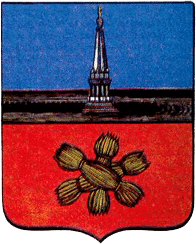
Coat of Ukmerge (1845)

Ukmergė County (Russian: Вилькомирский уезд, romanized: Vil'komirskiy uyezd, Lithuanian: Ukmergės apskritis) was one of the subdivisions of the Kovno Governorate of the Russian Empire. It was a former administrative-territorial unit in eastern Lithuania lasting from 1795 to 1950, situated on both banks of the Šventoji River. Its administrative centre was Ukmergė.

== History ==
=== Russian Empire ===
The county evolved from the Vilkmergė District (pavietas) of the Grand Duchy of Lithuania. After its reorganization into the Vilkmergė Uyezd, it belonged to the Vilnius Governate of the Russian Empire between 1795–1797 and 1801–1842, to the short-lived Lithuanian Governate between 1797–1801, and later to the Kovno Governate from 1842–1915. It subsequently became one of the administrative counties of the Kingdom of Lithuania.

=== Interwar and postwar period ===
From 1916 to 1918, the territory was part of the German military administration known as Ober Ost. During the German occupation of 1941–1944, it was incorporated into the Reichskommissariat Ostland, specifically into the Lithuanian General District (Generalbezirk Litauen) and the Panevėžys regional district.

In 1920, the Ukmergė region witnessed fighting between Lithuanian and Polish forces during the Polish–Lithuanian conflict of 1919–1920.

In 1947, two parishes (valsčiai) were transferred to the newly formed Anykščiai County. On 20 June 1950, Ukmergė County was reorganized into the Ukmergė District Municipality, consisting of 27 rural subdistricts (apylinkės). Parts of its territory were transferred into neighboring districts: Jonava (4 subdistricts), Kavarskas (16), Ramygala (4), Smėliai (20), and Širvintos (1).

== Demographics ==
At the time of the Russian Empire Census of 1897, Ukmergė County had a population of 229,118. Of these, 72.3% spoke Lithuanian, 13.2% Yiddish, 10.0% Polish, 4.1% Russian, 0.2% German, 0.1% Belarusian, 0.1% Romani and 0.1% Ukrainian as their native language.
