= General Bułak-Bałachowicz's Army Cross of Valor =

The Cross of Valour of the former Allied Volunteer Army of General Stanisław Bułak-Bałachowicz Krzyż Waleczności b. Ochotniczej Sprzymierzonej Armii generała Stanisława Bułak-Bałachowicza
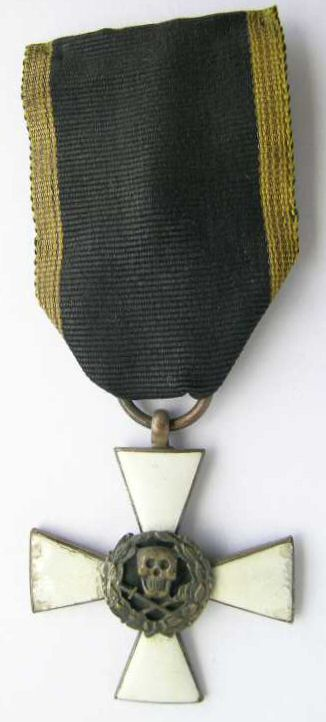
- Established: 15th November 1917
- Country: Polish Second Republic
- Status: Banned from use in Poland during the 1930s; Stopped production after 1939
- ribbon

The Cross of Valour of the former Allied Volunteer Army of General Stanisław Bułak-Bałachowicz (Polish: Krzyż Waleczności b. Ochotniczej Sprzymierzonej Armii generała Stanisława Bułak-Bałachowicza) or more commonly known as the General Bułak-Bałachowicz's Army Cross of Valor was a military decoration established in Poland.

== History ==
=== Creation ===
The cross was established on 15 November 1917 in Estonia as a decoration for bravery and valour, on the initiative of the formation fighting there under the command of General Bułak-Bałachowicz. During the Russian Civil War from 1917–1919 to the Polish-Soviet War in 1920, this formation, known as the Volunteer and Allied Army, acted as an ally of the Polish army. Despite commanding a Russian unit, he settled and operated in Poland, where he obtained citizenship on the basis of his participation in the war on our side. The general's wartime past was a pretext for creating badges, the diplomas and ID cards for which he personally signed. Most likely, he himself composed the historical narrative, referring to facts that were not confirmed anywhere else and relating the creation of the badges to 1917 and their intended use as combat decorations for the soldiers under his command.

Nominally, since 1931, the Cross of Valour was administered by a ‘chapter’ headed by the general, not formally affiliated with any veterans' association with it having a secretary. Apart from lending credibility to the whole enterprise, it most likely served as a preliminary selection process for clients based on their financial status. Tens of thousands of members, as declared by the management boards of veterans' organisations, were very poor people, usually unemployed, who were even in arrears with their membership fees, which were symbolic amounts. During the 1930s from a lack of funds many orders for the cross started to have defects such as crosses without numbers, in slightly poorer quality boxes or medals not even being made of silver.

=== Scandal and downfall ===
The issue of trading crosses became widely known among veterans which not only lead to the cross being more worthless but the Polish authorities where were several reasons for this as it envolved a lot of money, for which there were probably no receipts in most transactions and no tax was paid, while the purchase and acquisition of the badge itself compromised those involved which could undermine the business, with the fact that fraudulent salesmen in the organisation were selling fake crosses were discovered, Bałachowicz certainly saw a threat to his position because he published a small book about himself and, among other things, the Cross of Valour. In it, he presented his version of events without details and even falsely (he claimed that the lack of recognition of the Cross was a rumour). The signal about the already known scandal was the information in the press about the trade in crosses So the general's version was presented, that fraudsters had forged them without his knowledge, etc., but the title and message were clear – the crosses of General Bałachowicz's army were fake and this turn of events lead to the tarnishing of General Bałachowicz's image and the Valor cross.

From 1934 to 1936 and 1937-1939 were periods of time where the cross was being produced and sold for example, after 1935, the Warsaw-based company S. Zygadlewicz sold full-size crosses for 10 zlotys with a ribbon and small ones for 5 zlotys and the medal ending up in German and French markets.

The Ministry of Military Affairs in 1932 placing the Cross of Valour and the Star of Death on the list of decorations and badges prohibited from being worn.

== Insignia ==
The Cross of Valour of the former Allied Volunteer Army of General Stanisław Bułak-Bałachowicz resembled the Russian military Order of St. George, It was a cross measuring 41 x 37 mm. The obverse of the cross had white enamel arms. In the centre of the cross was a shield surrounded by a laurel wreath, inside which was an image of a skull, under which a sword and a torch were crossed the origin of the symbol is explained by General Bułak-Balachowicz himself:

"There were rewards on our heads. Orders had been given not to take us prisoner. To protect ourselves from a shameful death, each of us had fast-acting poison just in case. There were cases where the Germans even hung the bodies of partisans, as they claimed, to instil fear, for which we retaliated. Hence, our organisation was called the ‘Knights of Death’ and adopted a combat badge as its emblem, a white cross with a skull, a torch and a sword. After the war with Germany, we introduced this badge in the war with the Bolsheviks, and it became established in my combat units as the highest combat order."

The reverse of the badge was smooth. The cross was worn on a black ribbon with gold stripes on the sides.

In 1932 the Star of the Knights of Death bearing the motto ‘For our and your freedom.’ was created most likely as a result of the commercial success of the Cross of Valour. The star was accompanied by a decorative diploma with the image against the backdrop of the flags of the countries and territories where Bałachowicz's unit fought but this star is much rarer are it was more expensive. Also, from 1932 onwards the star was sold with and without swords.

== Recipients ==
- Stanisław Bułak-Bałachowicz - World War I Polish-Belorussian general who established the military award
- Szczepan Augustyniak
- Józef Boguszewski
- Emil Czapliński
- Mieczysław Borkowski
- Aleksander Dmytrak
- Stanisław Gepner
- Józef Mańczak
- Wilhelm Obrzut

== See also ==
- Orders, decorations, and medals of Poland
- Stanisław Bułak-Bałachowicz
