= Stanisław Bułak-Bałachowicz =

Belarusian-Polish general (1883–1940)

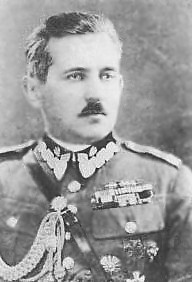

President of the Belarusian Provisional Government
- In office 12 November 1920 – 28 November 1920
- Preceded by: Piotra Krečeŭski (in exile)
- Succeeded by: Piotra Krečeŭski (in exile)

Personal details
- Born: 22 February [O.S. 10 February] 1883 Meyshty, Novoalexandrovsky Uyezd, Kovno Governorate, Russian Empire
- Died: 10 May 1940 (aged 57) Warsaw, General Government, Nazi Germany

Military service
- Allegiance: Russian Empire (1914–1917); Russian Republic (1917); Soviet Russia (1917–1918); White Movement (1918–1919); Belarusian People's Republic (1919); Poland (1919–1939)
- Branch/service: (Russian Empire) Imperial Russian Army (Russian Soviet Federative Socialist Republic) Red Army (Russian Republic) Northwestern Army; Belarusian National Army (Poland) Polish Army
- Years of service: 1914–1939
- Rank: General
- Battles/wars: First World War; Russian Civil War; Estonian War of Independence; Polish–Soviet War; Second World War; Invasion of Poland

Stanisław Bułak-Bałachowicz (Note: Belarusian: Станіслаў Булак-Балаховіч, Russian: Станисла́в Була́к-Балахо́вич) (22 February [O.S. 10 February] 1883 – 10 May 1940) was a Polish-Belarusian general and veteran of World War I, the Russian Civil War, Estonian War of Independence, Polish-Soviet War, and the Invasion of Poland at the start of World War II.

== Biography ==
=== Early life ===
Stanisław Bułak-Bałachowicz was born 22 February [O.S. 10 February] 1883 in Meikštai, a small village in the Zarasai County of the Kovno Governorate in the Russian Empire (now Ignalina District Municipality in Lithuania). Stanisław had two brothers and six sisters. His parents were servants to a local landlord

Following Stanisław's birth, his father left the landlord's service and acquired a small estate in Stakavievo near Vilnius.

After attending an agricultural school for four years in Belmontas, Bułak-Bałachowicz worked as an accountant, and in 1904 became a manager at the Count Plater's estates in Horodziec and Łużki.

At the time, he had a reputation as a defender of the less fortunate and was often an arbitrator in disputes between the farmers and their landlords. As a result of these activities, he acquired the nickname "Daddy" (Bat'ka). His other nickname —"Bułak"— became part of his surname. It means 'cloud' (another source offering the translation 'a man who is driven by the wind') in the Belarusian language.

=== World War I ===
After the outbreak of World War I and Grand Duke Nikolai Nikolayevich's address to the Polish people, Bułak-Bałachowicz joined the Russian Imperial army. As a person of noble roots, he was drafted as an ensign to the 2nd Leyb-Courland Infantry Regiment. However, unlike many of his colleagues who were awarded the basic NCO grades for their noble ancestry only, Bułak-Bałachowicz proved himself as a skilled field commander and was quickly promoted. By December 1914, only four months after he entered the army, he was given command over a group of Cossack volunteers, of whom he formed a cavalry squadron. Together with the 2nd Cavalry Division, he fought on the western front, most notably in the area of Sochaczew near Warsaw.

During the German summer offensive of 1915, Warsaw was taken by the Central Powers and Bułak-Bałachowicz's unit was forced to retreat towards Latvia.

In November 1915, Bułak-Bałachowicz was assigned to the special partisan regiment in the Northern Front headquarters as a squadron commander. His regiment under the command of colonel Punin L. took action in the Riga area. For their audacious actions, partisans were nicknamed "Knights of Death".

His unit was formed of four cavalry platoons: one of Cossack light cavalry, one of hussars, one of uhlans and one of dragoons. Thanks to the versatile and flexible structure of his unit, Bułak-Bałachowicz managed to continue the fight behind the enemy lines until 1918.

For the German campaign, Bułak-Bałachowicz was decorated with six Russian decorations and three Crosses of St. George (2nd, 3rd, and 4th degree).

=== Russian Civil War ===
On 5 March 1918, unaware of the Treaty of Brest-Litovsk signed only two days before, Bułak-Bałachowicz's unit skirmished with a German unit near the village of Smolova. Although the enemy unit was severely defeated, forced to retreat and abandon its staff behind, Bułak-Bałachowicz was seriously wounded after being shot in the left lung. Transported to Saint Petersburg, he quickly recovered and rejoined with his brother Józef Bułak-Bałachowicz. The latter got involved in the creation of a Polish cavalry detachment commanded by ensign Przysiecki. The Bolsheviks disbanded the unit soon after its formation, executed its commander and started to persecute its members. However, with the help of the French military mission, a Polish cavalry detachment was finally created and Stanisław Bułak-Bałachowicz became its commander. The new unit received Leon Trotsky's recognition and was soon reinforced with non-Polish volunteers from all over Russia and was planned as a cavalry division of the Red Army.

Soon after its creation, Bułak-Bałachowicz was ordered to quell the "Baron Korff Revolt" in the area of Luga near Petrograd (Saint Petersburg). With his incompletely-formed regiment, he reached the area and pacified the peasant unrest without the use of force. He was immediately called into Saint Petersburg by his superiors but was afraid of being arrested. Because of that, Bułak-Bałachowicz with his cavalry regiment deserted and moved across the Bolshevik lines to the area of Pskov, held by the joint forces of White Russian Northern Corps and various German anti-Bolshevik units. Initially, the unit fought against the Reds on the White side, but soon conflicts with the German officials arose and Bułak-Bałachowicz switched sides yet again. Together with his battle-hardened unit he disarmed the German units surrounding him and broke to the rear of the Red-held territory. From there he fought his way across the fronts to the newly independent Estonia, where he then participated in the formation of general Nikolai Nikolaevich Yudenich's Northwestern Army. Units commanded by Bułak-Bałachowicz assisted the Estonian Army in the victorious battles of Tartu, Võru, and Vastseliina, and he was soon thereafter promoted to lieutenant colonel.

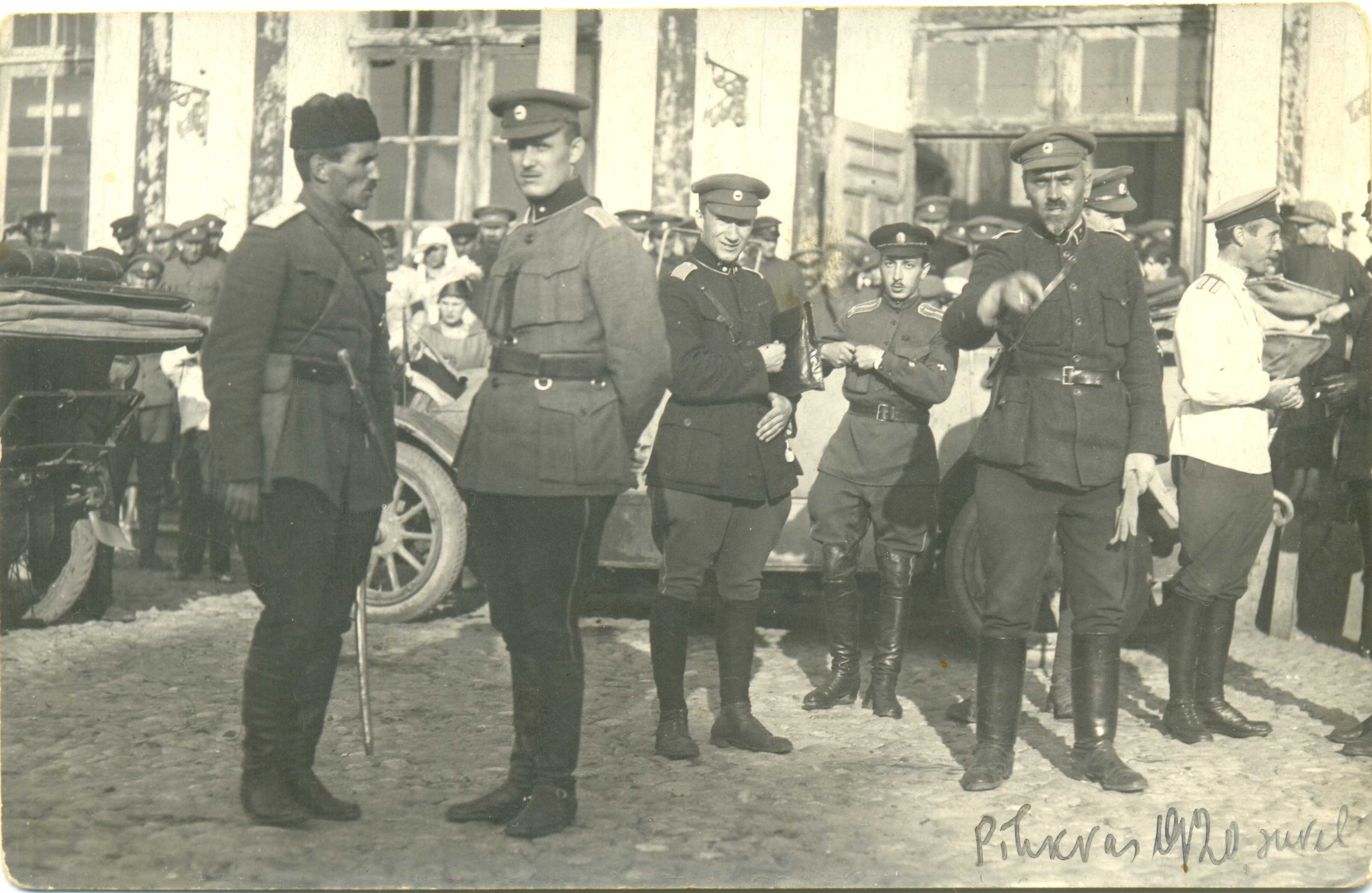
The highest command of Estonian Army visited Bułak-Bałachowicz's forces in Pskov on 31 May 1919; Bułak-Bałachowicz (left) talks with Estonian general Johan Laidoner.

On 10 May 1919, Bałachowicz was given the command over an assault group and was ordered to drive it to the rear of the Bolshevik lines. Three days later his forces took the town of Gdov by surprise and on 29 May Bałachowicz entered Pskov. For this action, he was promoted to colonel by General Yudenich. Because of his victories, his subordinates (mostly Belarusian, Cossack, and Polish volunteers) nicknamed him "ataman", though some preferred to use the term Bat'ko – father.

Bułak-Bałachowicz became the military administrator of Pskov. He personally ceded most of his responsibilities to a municipal duma and focused on both the cultural and economic recovery of the war-impoverished city. He also put an end to censorship of the press and allowed for the creation of several socialist associations and newspapers, which enraged White generals towards him. Finally, Bułak-Bałachowicz entered in contact with Estonian officers and Poles who were trying to reach the renascent Polish Army, which was seen by Bałachowicz's superiors as a sign of lack of loyalty. After Pskov was yet again lost to the Bolsheviks in mid-July, general Yudenich ordered Stanisław Bułak-Bałachowicz to be arrested even though only a few days earlier he promoted him to major general (a move Yudenich undertook with hopes of appeasing Bułak-Bałachowicz and encouraging greater subordinance).

However, once again Bułak-Bałachowicz evaded being captured. He handed over his division to his brother Józef and, together with 20 of his friends, left for Estonian-controlled Ostrov. There he once again created a partisan unit. With 600 men he broke through the Red Army front and started to disrupt its supply lines. Despite Yudenich's hostility towards Bułak-Bałachowicz, the latter cooperated with White Russian units during their counter-offensive in the autumn of 1919. His unit captured the railway node in Porkhov and broke the Pskov-Polotsk railroad, which added greatly to the White Russian's initial success. On 5 November 1919, his unit yet again entered the area between Pskov and Ostrov and destroyed the three remaining railway lines linking Pskov with the rest of Russia. However, Yudenich's army could not link up with the areas controlled by Bułak-Bałachowicz and their assault was finally broken.

On 22 January 1920, general Yudenich signed an order of dissolution of his badly beaten army. On 28 January 1920, general Bułak-Bałachowicz, together with several Russian officers, was arrested by the Estonian police. A large amount of money was found with him (roughly 227,000 British pounds; 250,000 Estonian marks; and 110 million Finnish marks) was given to the soldiers of the disbanded army as the last salary, which greatly added to Bałachowicz's popularity amongst them.

=== Short service for the Belarusian Democratic Republic ===
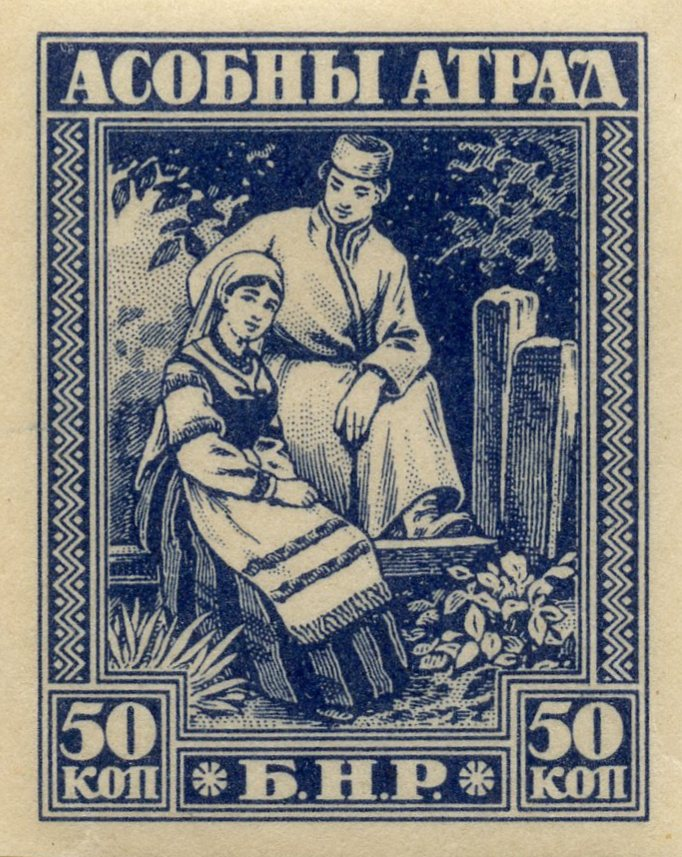
A postal stamp of the Belarusian Democratic Republic, issued in Latvia by the Special Unit (Belarusian: Асобны атрад) led by Bułak-Bałachowicz

From 1918, Bałachowicz was in contact with the representatives of the Belarusian Democratic Republic (BDR) in the Baltic states. On 7 November 1919, the government of the BDR agreed to finance Bałachowicz's unit and on 14 November, Stanisław Bułak-Bałachowicz received his Belarusian citizenship and applied for official service for the Belarusian Democratic Republic. His unit was officially renamed to Special Unit of the Belarusian Democratic Republic in the Baltics (Belarusian: Асобны атрад БНР у Балтыі), received Belarusian uniforms and a seal. The unit issued its own field postal stamps and engaged in a few minor battles with the Bolsheviks.

=== Polish-Bolshevik War ===
In February 1920 Stanisław Bułak-Bałachowicz contacted Józef Piłsudski through the Polish envoy to Riga and proposed to ally his unit with the Polish Army against the Bolshevist Russia. As the fame of the general preceded him, Piłsudski agreed and soon afterwards Bułak-Bałachowicz with some 800 cavalrymen set off for yet another of his great odysseys. After leaving Estonia, they outflanked the Red Russian lines and rode several hundred kilometres behind the enemy lines to Latvia, where they were allowed to pass through Latvian territory. Finally, by mid-March, they reached Dyneburg (now Daugavpils, then under Polish military administration), where they were greeted as heroes by Józef Piłsudski himself.

General Bułak-Bałachowicz's Army Cross of Valor, a military award created for the soldiers of Bułak-Bałachowicz's units

Transferred to Brześć Litewski, the Bułak-Bałachowicz's unit was reformed into a Bułak-Bałachowicz Operational Group, sometimes incorrectly referred to as Belarusian-Lithuanian Division. It was composed mostly of Belarusian volunteers, as well as veterans of the Green Army and former Red Army soldiers, and received the status of an allied army. Because of the composition of his troops, Stanisław Bułak-Bałachowicz is sometimes referred to as a Belarusian.

Formally independent, the division was one of the most successful units fighting in the ranks of the Polish Army during the Polish-Bolshevik War. The unit entered combat in late June 1920 in the area of Polesie Marshes. On 30 June Bułak-Bałachowicz once again broke through the enemy lines and captured the village of Sławeczno in today's Belarus, where the tabors of the Soviet 2nd Rifle Brigade were stationed. The enemy unit was caught by surprise and suffered heavy losses. On 3 July the enemy unit was completely surrounded in the village of Wieledniki and was annihilated. After that action, the Operational Group was withdrawn to the main lines of the Polish 3rd Army and after 10 July it defended the line of the Styr river against Red Army actions.

On 23 July 1920, during the Bolshevik offensive towards central Poland, general Bałachowicz's group started an organised retreat as a rearguard of the Polish 3rd Army. During that operation, Bułak-Bałachowicz abandoned the withdrawing Polish troops and stayed with his forces for several days behind the enemy lines only to break through to the Polish forces shortly afterwards. During the Battle of Warsaw overnight of 14 August Bałachowicz's forces were ordered to start a counter-attack towards the town of Włodawa, one of the centres of concentration of the advancing Russian forces. On 17 August the area was secured and the Bułak-Bałachowicz's forces defended it successfully until 7 September against numerically superior enemy forces. Stanisław Bułak-Bałachowicz organised an active defence and managed to disrupt the concentration of all enemy attacks before they could be started. For instance, on 30 August and 2 September his forces, supported by the Polish 7th Infantry Division, managed to attack the Soviet 58th Rifle Division from the rear before it could attack the town of Włodawa.

On 15 September 1920, the unit was yet again advancing in pursuit of the withdrawing Red Army. That day the unit captured Kamień Koszyrski, where it took more than 1000 prisoners of war and the matériel depot of an entire division. During the Battle of the Niemen River Bałachowicz's unit prevented the enemy from forming a defensive line in Polesie. Overnight on 21 September, his unit outflanked and then destroyed completely the Bolshevik 88th Rifle Regiment near the town of Lubieszów. Perhaps the most notable victory of the Bułak-Bałachowicz's Group took place on 26 September, when his forces took Pinsk in the rear. The city was the most important railroad junction in the area and was planned as the last stand of the Bolshevik forces still fighting to the west of that city. Several contemporary sources accused Bułak-Bałachowicz’s troops of participating in pogroms during the fighting around Pinsk in 1920. The scale, reliability, and attribution of these accusations remain disputed among historians. According to the newspaper Svoboda (issue 85, 24 October 1920), Bułak-Bałachowicz issued an order on 20 October 1920 condemning “murders and looting” reported after the capture of Pinsk, stating that such acts “disgrace our name” and ordering that soldiers and officers caught participating in pogroms be executed on the spot. The same issue of Svoboda published a second order authorizing the creation of a separate Jewish detachment under the headquarters of the People’s Volunteer Army. Historian Anatoly Gritskevich notes that these orders indicate an official attempt by Bułak-Bałachowicz to suppress pogroms and punish perpetrators, rather than organize them.

=== Failed uprising in Belarus ===
In October Stanisław Bułak-Bałachowicz was stationed with his forces in Pinsk, where they received supplies and a large number of former Red Army soldiers who were taken prisoner of war after the Battle of Warsaw and volunteered for the service in anti-Bolshevik units. The unit was to re-enter combat in November, but on 12 October a cease fire was signed. On the insistence of both the Entente and Bolshevik Russia, the allied units were to leave Poland before 2 November. General Bułak-Bałachowicz was given the choice of either being interned in Poland with his units and then sent home or continuing the fight against the Reds on his own. He chose the latter option, just like most other White Russian and Ukrainian units fighting on the Polish side in the Polish-Bolshevik War.

On 2 November 1920, his units were renamed the Russian People's Volunteer Army and transferred to the areas that were to be abandoned by the Polish Army and become a no-man's-land until the final Russo-Polish peace treaty was signed. Three days later his forces crossed into Russian-held Belarus and started an offensive towards Homel. General Bułak-Bałachowicz was hoping for a Belarusian all-national uprising against Bolshevik Russia. His forces initially achieved limited success and captured Homel and Rechytsa.

On 10 November 1920 Bułak-Bałachowicz entered Mozyr. There, two days later, he again proclaimed the independence of the Belarusian Democratic Republic with himself as the head of state. Bułak-Bałachowicz declared the exiled Rada BNR as dismissed and started forming a new Belarusian National Army. On 16 November 1920, he also created the Belarusian Provisional Government. However, the planned uprising gained little support in the Belarusian nation, worn tired by six years of constant war and the Red Army finally gained an upper hand. On 18 November 1920, Bałachowicz abandoned Mozyr and started a withdrawal towards the Polish frontier. The Belarusian troops, hardened by the years spent behind the enemy lines, fought their way to Poland and managed to inflict heavy casualties on the advancing Russians while suffering negligible losses, but were too weak to turn the tide of war.

Representatives of Balachowicz participated in the organization and conduction of the Slutsk Defence Action that started in late November around Slutsk.

On 28 November, the last organised unit under his command crossed the Polish border and was subsequently interned. The Soviet Russian government demanded that General Bułak-Bałachowicz be handed over to them and tried for high treason. The Riga Peace Conference was even halted by these demands for several days, but eventually, these claims were refuted by the Polish government which argued that Bułak-Bałachowicz was a Polish citizen since 1918.

=== Interbellum ===
Shortly after the Riga Peace Treaty had been signed, Bułak-Bałachowicz and his men were set free from the internment camps. The general retired from the army and settled in Warsaw. There he became an active member of various veteran societies. Among other functions, he held the post of the head of Society of Former Fighters of the National Uprisings. He was also a political essayist and writer of two books on the possibilities of a future war with Germany: "Wojna będzie czy nie będzie" (Will There Be War or Will There Be None; 1931) and "Precz z Hitlerem czy niech żyje Hitler" (Down With Hitler or Long live Hitler?, 1933). According to non-scientific accounts, between 1936 and 1939 he served as an advisor to Franco's nationalists in the Spanish Civil War, yet historians claim this is merely a legend.

In 1923, there were false reports of his death in the local Polish press; supposedly, he had been murdered by White Russians in the Bialowieża Woods. The Jewish Telegraph Agency remarked on his reported passing: "The murder of this ruthless insurrectionary and counter-revolutionary leader brings an end to the career of a bloodthirsty pogromist," referring to a February 1921 report by the Federation of Ukrainian Jews, that more than 1000 Jews in Minsk and Gomel were killed by Balachowitz's men.

=== World War II ===
During the Invasion of Poland of 1939, Stanisław Bułak-Bałachowicz volunteered for the Polish army. He created a Volunteer Group that fought in the defence of Warsaw. The unit consisted of approximately 1750 ill-equipped infantrymen and 250 cavalrymen. It was used on the southern flank of the Polish forces defending the Polish capital and adopted the tactics its commander knew perfectly well: fast attacks on the rear of the enemy forces. On 12 September 1939, the unit entered combat for the first time. It took the German defenders by surprise and retook the southernmost borough of Służew and the Służewiec horse track. Soon afterwards the cavalry organised a disrupting attack on the German infantry stationed in Natolin. On 23 September the unit was transferred to northern Warsaw, where it was to organise an assault on the German positions in the Bielany forest. The assault had been prepared but was thwarted by the cease-fire signed on 27 September.

After the capitulation of Warsaw, general Bułak-Bałachowicz (formally retired) evaded being captured by the Germans and returned to civilian life. At the same time, he was the main organiser of Konfederacja Wojskowa (Military Confederation), one of the first underground resistance groups in German and Soviet-occupied Poland. In early 1940 the Gestapo found out his whereabouts. He was surrounded by a group of young conspirators in a house in Warsaw's borough of Saska Kępa and arrested by the Germans. According to the most common version, Bułak-Bałachowicz was shot by Gestapo agents on 10 May 1940, in the Warsaw centre, on the intersection between Francuska and Trzeciego Maja streets.

== Honours and awards ==
- Cross of St. George, 4th class
- Medal of St. George, 4th class
- Cross of Valour (Poland)
- General Bułak-Bałachowicz's Army Cross of Valor

== See also ==
- List of unsolved murders (1900–1979)

== Notes and references ==
In-line:

General:

1. Rafał Berger (2001). "Generał Stanisław Bułak-Bałachowicz". Koło tradycji wojskowej generała Stanisława Bułak-Bałachowicza (in Polish).
2. Marek Cabanowski (2000). Generał Stanisław Bułak-Bałachowicz: zapomniany bohater (Bułak-Bałachowicz, a Forgotten Hero) (in Polish). Grodzisk Mazowiecki: Ośrodek Kultury. ISBN 83-904339-5-8. (review)
3. Oleg Łatyszonek (1990). "Generał Bułak-Bałachowicz w wojnie 1920 r". Sybirak (in Polish). 2 (5): 7–12.
4. Jarosław Tomasiewicz. "Ostatnia wojna pierwszej Rzeczypospolitej". Zakorzenienie (in Polish) (Wszystkie dzieci Rzeczpospolitej).
5. Tomasz Paluszyński, Stanisław Bułak-Bałachowicz w estońskiej wojnie narodowo-wyzwoleńczej w latach 1918–1919, w: Poznańskie Zeszyty Humanistyczne, t. VI, Poznań 2006, s. 81–99.
6. Tomasz Paluszyński, Przejście oddziału generała Stanisława Bułak-Bałachowicza z Estonii do Polski (marzec 1920 roku), w: Polska i Europa w XIX-XX wieku. Studia historyczno-politologiczne, red. J. Kiwerska, B. Koszek, D. Matelski, Poznań 1992, s. 109–124.
7. Janusz Cisek, Białoruskie oddziały gen. Stanisława Bułak-Bałachowicza w polityce Józefa Piłsudskiego w okresie wojny polsko-nolszewickiej (marzec-grudzień 1920). Rozprawa doktorska napisana w 1993 r. w Instytucie Historii Uniwersytetu Wrocławskiego pod kierunkiem prof. Wojciecha Wrzesińskiego.
8. Pantalejmon Simanskij, Kampania białoruska Rosyjskiej Armii Ludowo-Ochotniczej gen. S. Bułak-Bałachowicza w 1920 r., w: "Bellona", t. XXXVII, 1931, s. 196–232.
9. Marek Cabanowski, Generał Stanisław Bułak-Bałachowicz. Zapomniany bohater, Warszawa 1993, s. 204.
10. Oleg Łatyszonek, Białoruskie formacje wojskowe 1917–1923, Białystok 1995.
11. Oleg Łatyszonek Spod czerwonej gwiazdy pod biały krzyż, w: Zeszyty Naukowe Muzeum Wojska", nr 6, Białystok 1992.
12. Zbigniew Karpus, Oleg Łatyszonek, Życiorys gen. Stanisława Bułak-Bałachowicza, w: Białoruskie Zeszyty Historyczne (Białystok), 1995, nr 2 (4), s. 160–169.
13. Zbigniew Karpus, Wschodni Sojusznicy Polski w wojnie 1920 roku. Oddziały wojskowe ukraińskie, rosyjskie, kozackie i białoruskie w Polsce w latach 1919–1920, Toruń 1999.
