= Czesław Michniewicz =

Polish football manager (born 1970)

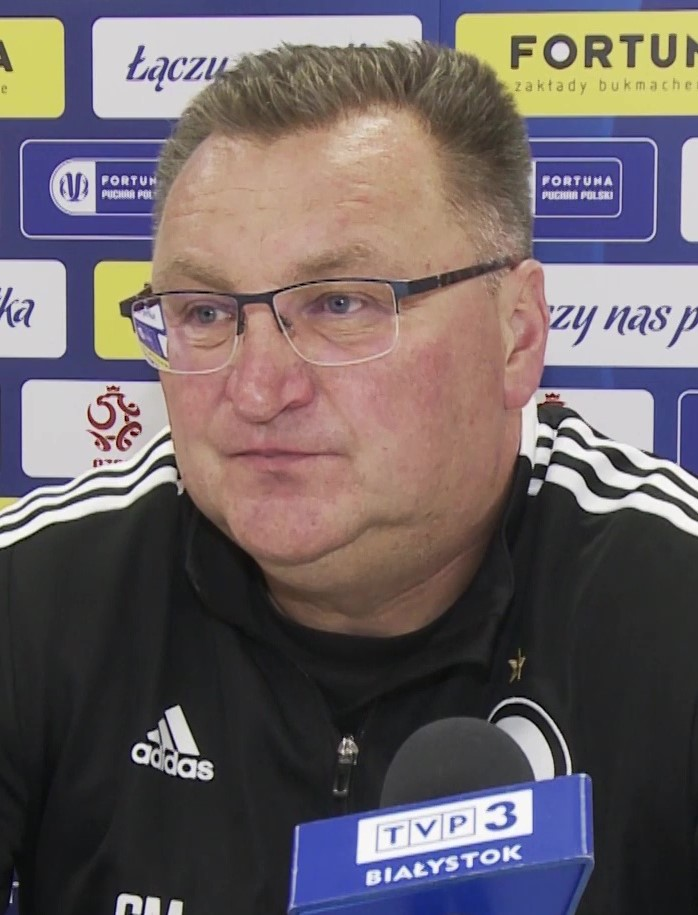
- Michniewicz with Legia Warszawa in 2021

Personal information
- Full name: Czesław Michniewicz
- Date of birth: 12 February 1970 (age 56)
- Place of birth: Byarozawka, Byelorussian SSR, Soviet Union
- Height: 1.88 m (6 ft 2 in)
- Position: Goalkeeper

Senior career*
Years	Team	Apps	(Gls)
1978–1985	Ossa Biskupiec Pomorski		
1985–1993	Bałtyk Gdynia		
1993–1996	Polonia Gdańsk		
1996–2000	Amica Wronki	9	(0)

Managerial career
- 2003–2006: Lech Poznań
- 2006–2007: Zagłębie Lubin
- 2008–2009: Arka Gdynia
- 2010–2011: Widzew Łódź
- 2011: Jagiellonia Białystok
- 2012: Polonia Warsaw
- 2013: Podbeskidzie Bielsko-Biała
- 2015–2016: Pogoń Szczecin
- 2016–2017: Bruk-Bet Termalica Nieciecza
- 2017–2020: Poland U21
- 2020–2021: Legia Warsaw
- 2022: Poland
- 2023: Abha
- 2024: AS FAR
- * Club domestic league appearances and goals

Czesław Michniewicz (Polish pronunciation: [ˈt͡ʂɛswaf mixˈɲɛvit͡ʂ]; born 12 February 1970) is a Polish professional football manager and former player who most recently managed Botola Pro side AS FAR. He managed the Poland national team in 2022.

== Managerial career ==
=== Early years ===
In September 2003, Michniewicz was appointed as the manager of Lech Poznań. He led the side to the 2003–04 Polish Cup and Polish Super Cup titles. He left the club in June 2006. In October 2006, he was appointed manager of Ekstraklasa side Zagłębie Lubin, leading the club to the 2006–07 league title. In October 2007, he was relieved of his duties. From 8 July 2008 to 12 April 2009 he managed Arka Gdynia in the Ekstraklasa. From 15 November 2010 until 30 June 2011, he managed Widzew Łódź. On 22 July 2011, he was appointed as the manager of Jagiellonia Białystok, but left the position on 22 December 2011 by mutual consent. On 28 March 2012, Michniewicz was named as the new coach of Polonia Warsaw, which he led until 8 May 2012.

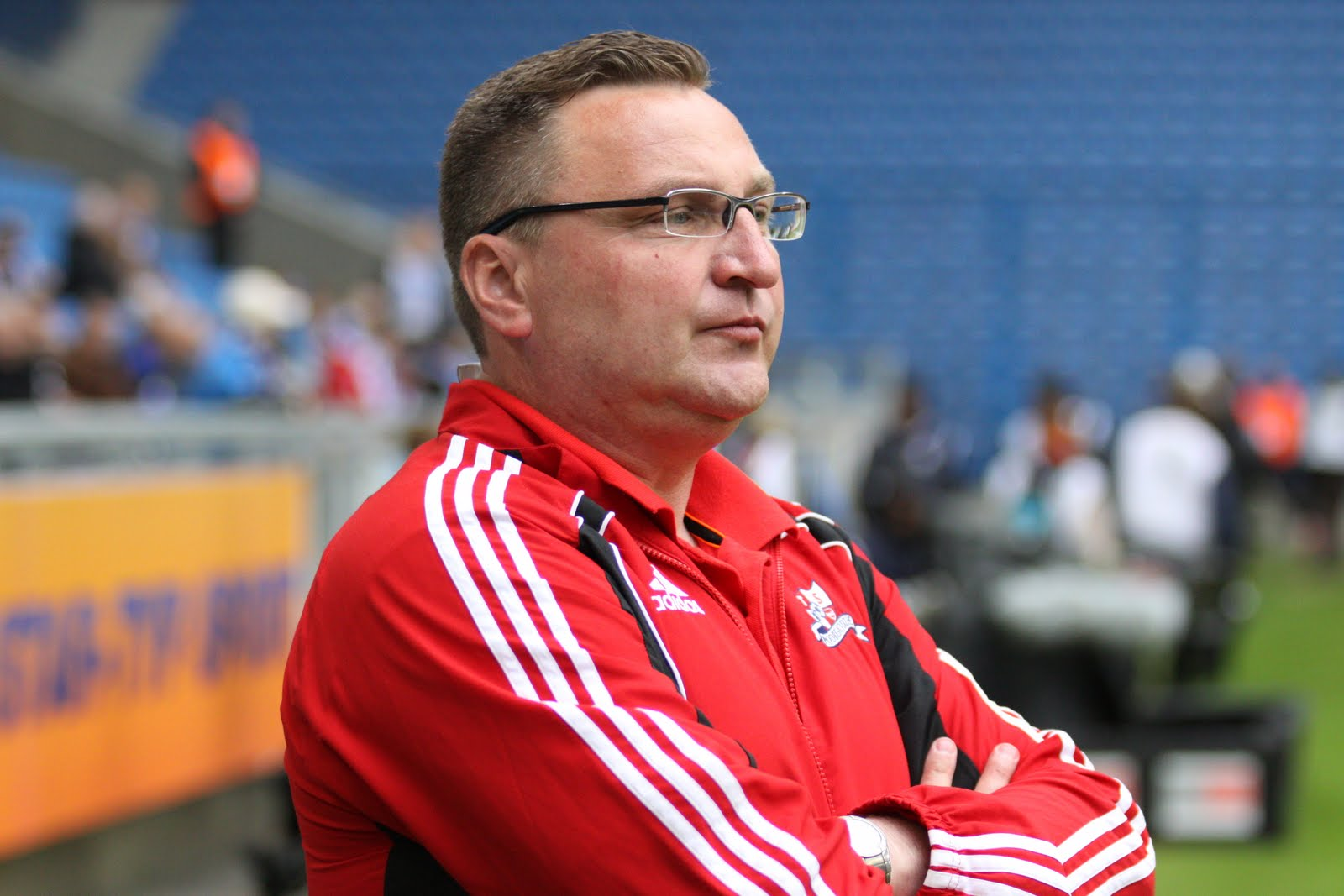
Michniewicz managing Podbeskidzie Bielsko-Biała in 2013

From 22 March to 22 October 2013, he managed Podbeskidzie Bielsko-Biała. After a year and a half pause, he was hired as the coach of Pogoń Szczecin. Michniewicz's side finished the league at sixth place in the 2015–16 season. Despite the best result in years, his contract was not renewed and he left the club on 30 June 2016. From 1 July 2016 to 22 March 2017, he was in charge of Bruk-Bet Termalica Nieciecza in Ekstraklasa.

=== Poland national under-21 team ===
On 7 July 2017, he was appointed as the coach of the Poland under-21 national team. After defeating Portugal in the play-offs, Poland under his leadership qualified for the first time since 1994 for the final tournament of the 2019 UEFA European Under-21 Championship. On 15 October 2020, he was replaced by Maciej Stolarczyk.

=== Legia Warsaw ===
On 21 September 2020, he was appointed as the coach of Legia Warsaw. In his debut Legia won 2–0 over FC Drita at the 2020–21 UEFA Europa League qualifiers. On 18 October 2020, he made his Ekstraklasa debut, as Legia won 2–1 over Zagłębie Lubin. On 11 December 2020, he was named Ekstraklasa's Coach of the Month after Legia's successful run in November. He was awarded the same distinction for March 2021, as his team completed the campaign in the above-mentioned month without any defeat. On 28 April 2021, Michniewicz won his second Polish Championship after 0–0 draw between Jagiellonia Białystok and Raków Częstochowa (as the latter team had already lost mathematical chances of catching up with Legia), with three games to spare.

On 26 August 2021, Legia led by Michniewicz defeated SK Slavia Prague, and for the first time in five years qualified for the group stages of a European cup. They would face Leicester City, Napoli and Spartak Moscow in the UEFA Europa League group stage.

Although Legia led their group after wins against Spartak Moscow and Leicester City, they struggled in the league. After four consecutive defeats, managing nine points in ten fixtures and sitting 15th in the table, Michniewicz was dismissed on 25 October 2021.

=== Poland national team ===
On 31 January 2022, Michniewicz was named as the new manager of Poland, signing a deal until 31 December 2022 with an extension option, following the previous manager Paulo Sousa's decision to join Flamengo three months before Poland's first 2022 FIFA World Cup qualification play-offs game. He was scheduled to make his debut against Russia in Moscow, prior to the disqualification of Russia. On 24 March, Poland played their first match under Michniewicz, a 1–1 draw in a friendly against Scotland.

On 29 March 2022, Michniewicz led Poland to a 2–0 victory over Sweden in the World Cup qualification play-off final. On 30 November 2022, Poland advanced to the knockout stage of the 2022 FIFA World Cup for the first time since 1986 under the lead of Michniewicz.

On 22 December 2022, following criticism of the national team's defensive tactics and style of play under Michniewicz by the media, a turmoil regarding bonuses for national team players and staff, Michniewicz blocking several journalists on Twitter before deleting his account, and reportedly shouldering part of the blame for the media fallout on team manager Jakub Kwiatkowski, it was announced Michniewicz's contract would not be extended and he was to leave his post on 31 December 2022.

=== Abha ===
On 12 June 2023, Michniewicz was announced as the new manager of Saudi club Abha. Following a good start to his stint, Abha suffered four straight league defeats in September, which led to Michniewicz's dismissal on 1 October 2023.

=== AS FAR ===
On 13 July 2024, Michniewicz became the head coach of Moroccan side AS FAR. On 22 September that year, he led the club to successfully qualify for the 2024–25 CAF Champions League, marking their return to the competition after 17 years of absence. On 15 October, with a record of four wins, three draws and two losses across all competitions, Michniewicz and AS FAR agreed to mutually part ways.

== Personal life ==
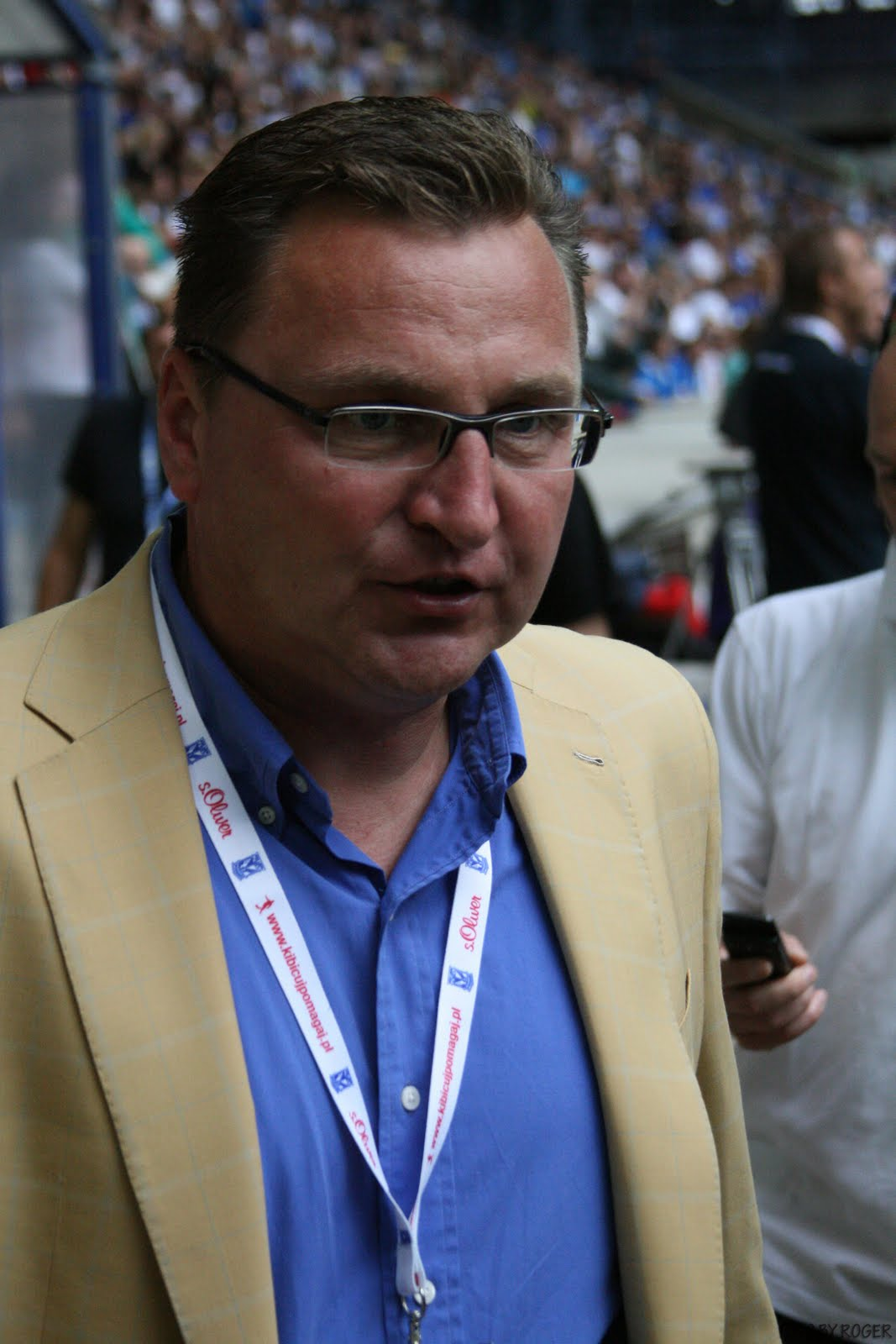
Michniewicz in 2010

Michniewicz was born in Byarozawka, then in the Byelorussian SSR, Soviet Union (present-day Belarus), while his mother was visiting her family; but grew up in Biskupiec, Poland. On 20 June 1998, he married Grażyna Rzewuska, with whom he has two sons: Mateusz (born 22 January 2001) and Jakub (born 13 August 2003).

== Managerial statistics ==
As of 15 October 2024

Managerial record by team and tenure
Team	Nation	From	To	Record				
Team	Nation	From	To	G	W	D	L	Win %
Lech Poznań	(Poland)	15 September 2003	17 May 2006	108	45	27	36	41.67
Zagłębie Lubin	(Poland)	3 October 2006	22 October 2007	37	21	7	9	56.76
Arka Gdynia	(Poland)	8 July 2008	12 April 2009	33	12	10	11	36.36
Widzew Łódź	(Poland)	15 November 2010	22 June 2011	17	8	4	5	47.06
Jagiellonia Białystok	(Poland)	22 July 2011	22 November 2011	18	6	4	8	33.33
Polonia Warsaw	(Poland)	28 March 2012	9 May 2012	7	2	1	4	28.57
Podbeskidzie Bielsko-Biała	(Poland)	22 March 2013	22 October 2013	24	7	8	9	29.17
Pogoń Szczecin	(Poland)	9 April 2015	17 May 2016	49	15	18	16	30.61
Bruk-Bet Termalica Nieciecza	(Poland)	6 June 2016	22 March 2017	27	10	6	11	37.04
Poland U21	(Poland)	7 July 2017	14 October 2020	27	14	7	6	51.85
Legia Warsaw	(Poland)	21 September 2020	25 October 2021	55	31	11	13	56.36
Poland	(Poland)	31 January 2022	31 December 2022	13	5	3	5	38.46
Abha	(Saudi Arabia)	12 June 2023	1 October 2023	9	3	0	6	33.33
AS FAR	(Morocco)	13 July 2024	15 October 2024	9	4	3	2	44.44
Total				434	183	109	142	42.17

== Honours ==
=== Player ===
Amica Wronki

- Polish Cup: 1998–99, 1999–2000
- Polish Super Cup: 1999

=== Manager ===
Lech Poznań

- Polish Cup: 2003–04
- Polish Super Cup: 2004

Zagłebie Lubin

- Ekstraklasa: 2006–07
- Polish Super Cup: 2007

Legia Warsaw

- Ekstraklasa: 2020–21

Individual

- Polish Coach of the Year: 2018, 2022
- Ekstraklasa Coach of the Month: May 2011, November 2020, March 2021
