= Krai =

Federal divisions of Russia

A krai or kray (Note: English: /kraɪ/ KRY; Russian: край [kraj], pl. края kráya [ˈkrajə]) is one of the types of federal subjects of modern Russia, and was a type of geographical administrative division in the Russian Empire and the Russian SFSR.

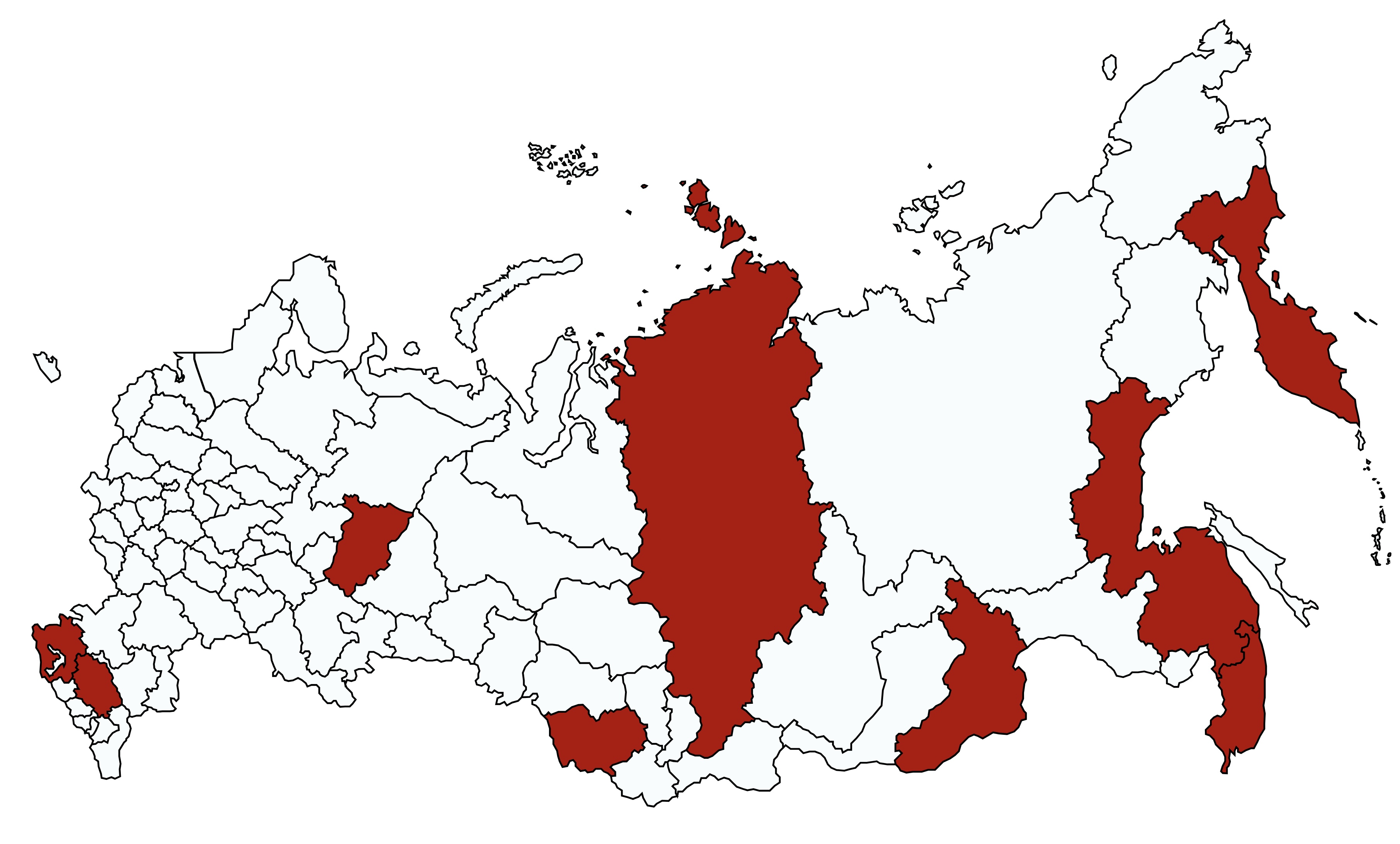
Map of Krais in the Russian Federation

Etymologically, the word is related to the verb кроить (kroítǐ [krɐˈitʲ]), meaning 'to cut'. Historically, krais were vast territories located along the periphery of the Russian state, since the word krai also means 'border' or 'edge', i.e., 'a place of the cut-off'. In English the term is often translated as 'territory'. As of 2015, the administrative usage of the term is mostly traditional, as some oblasts also fit this description and there is no difference in constitutional legal status in Russia between the krais and the oblasts.

== See also ==
- Krais of the Russian Empire
- Krais of Russia
- Governorate-General – a general term for Krais, Oblasts, and special city municipalities in the Russian Empire
- Oblast

Foreign terms with similar designation

- Kraj – an equivalent term used in the Czech Republic and Slovakia
- Krajina
- Marches
- Name of Ukraine
