= Telšių apskritis =

Telšių apskritis may refer to:

- Telšiai uezd, Russian Empire
- Telšiai County, Lithuania
