= Lida uezd =

Subdivision of the Grodno Governorate of the Russian Empire

Lida uezd Лидскій уѣздъ
- Uezd
- Location in the Vilna Governorate
- Country: Russian Empire
- Krai: Northwestern
- Governorate: Vilna
- Established: 1795
- Abolished: 1920
- Capital: Lida

Area
  - Total: 5,616 km^{2} (2,168 sq mi)

Population (1897)
  - Total: 205,767
  - Density: 36.64/km^{2} (94.90/sq mi)
  - Urban: 4.53%
  - Rural: 95.47%

The Lida uezd (Note: Russian: Лидскій уѣздъ, romanized: Lidskiy uyezd; Lithuanian: Lydos apskritis; Belarusian: Лідскі павет, romanized: Lidski paviet) was a subdivision (uezd) of the Vilna Governorate of the Russian Empire. It was situated in the southwestern part of the governorate. Its administrative centre was Lida.

== Demographics ==
At the time of the Russian Empire census of 1897, Lidsky Uyezd had a population of 205,767. Of these, 73.2% spoke Belarusian, 12.0% Yiddish, 8.6% Lithuanian, 4.7% Polish, 1.2% Russian, 0.1% Ukrainian and 0.1% German as their native language.

== Populated places ==
According to the Russian Empire census of 1897, the largest populated places were the town of Lida and mestechkos Eišiškės, Vasilishki, Ostrino, Zhaludok, Shchuchyn, Byelitsa, Radun, Voronovo, Novy Dvor, and Orlya.

== See also ==
- Lida district
