= Lida district =

District of Grodno region, Belarus

Lida district Лідскі раён (Belarusian) Лидский район (Russian)
- District
- Flag Coat of arms

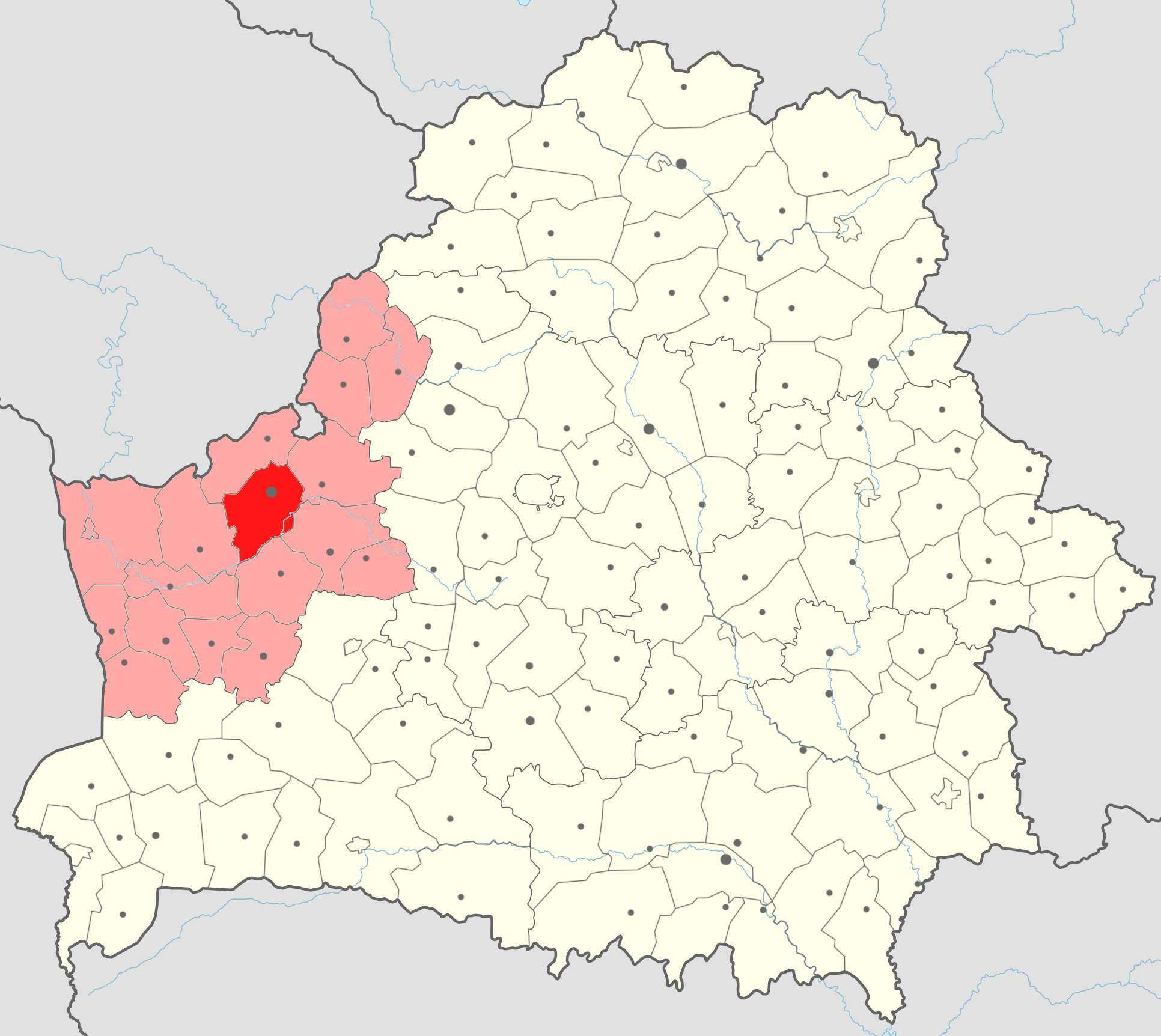
- Coordinates: 53°53′14″N 25°18′10″E
- Country: Belarus
- Region: Grodno region
- Administrative center: Lida

Area
  - District: 1,566.74 km^{2} (604.92 sq mi)

Population (2024)
  - District: 132,869
  - Density: 84.8060/km^{2} (219.647/sq mi)
  - Urban: 113,437
  - Rural: 19,432
- Time zone: UTC+3 (MSK)

Lida district (Belarusian: Лідскі раён; Russian: Лидский район) is a district (raion) of Grodno region in Belarus. The administrative center is Lida. As of 2024, it has a population of 132,869.

== Notable residents ==
- Vitold Ashurak (1970, Aharodniki village – 2021), Belarusian activist and political prisoner who died in custody
- Kyprian Kandratovich (1859, Zinovičy village – 1932), military officer, commander of the armed forces of the short-lived Belarusian Democratic Republic

== See also ==
- Lida uezd
