= Antandraja =

- Village
- Location within Lithuania
- Coordinates: 55.613°N 25.762°E
- Country: Lithuania
- County: Utena County

Population
  - Total: 44
- Time zone: Eastern European Time (UTC+2)
  - Summer (DST): Eastern European Summer Time (UTC+3)

Antandraja is a village in Anykščiai District Municipality, Utena County, Lithuania. The population was 44 in 2011.
