= Vileysky Uyezd =

Vileysky Uyezd (Вилейский уезд) was one of the subdivisions of the Vilna Governorate of the Russian Empire. It was situated in the eastern part of the governorate. Its administrative centre was Vileyka.

== History ==
Vileysky Uyezd was organised after the Second Partition of Poland in 1793. It was a part of Minsk Governorate from 1793 until 1843, when it was transferred to Vilna Governorate.

== Demographics ==
At the time of the Russian Empire Census of 1897, Vileysky Uyezd had a population of 208,013. Of these, 86.9% spoke Belarusian, 9.5% Yiddish, 2.5% Polish, 0.9% Russian, 0.1% Tatar and 0.1% Lithuanian as their native language.
