= Oshmyansky Uyezd =

Subdivision of Vilna Governorate, Russian Empire

Coordinates: 54°25′30″N 25°56′15″E

Oshmyansky Uyezd (Ошмянский уезд) was one of the seven subdivisions of the Vilna Governorate of the Russian Empire. It was situated in the southern part of the governorate. Its administrative centre was Ashmyany (Oshmyany).

== Demographics ==
At the time of the Russian Empire Census of 1897, Oshmyansky Uyezd had a population of 233,559. Of these, 80.0% spoke Belarusian, 12.1% Yiddish, 3.7% Lithuanian, 2.3% Russian and 1.7% Polish as their native language.
