= Novoaleksandrovsky uezd =

Novoaleksandrovsky uezd (Russian: Новоалександровский уезд, Lithuanian: Novoaleksandrovsko apskritis ) was one of the uezds of the Russian Empire. Its capital was Novoaleksandrovsk, now Zarasai.

== History ==
Established 1795 under Vilna Governorate, it was transferred to the Kovno Governorate in 1843. In 1916, under the German occupation (Ober Ost) of World War I, two counties were formed in the area, Kreis Rakischki (Rokiškis county) and Kreis Saldutischki (Saldutiškis county). Shortly after the Russian Revolution, since 1919, the territory belonged to the independent Lithuania.

== Demographics ==
At the time of the Russian Empire Census of 1897, Novoaleksandrovsky uezd had a population of 208,487. Of these, 49.8% spoke Lithuanian, 16.8% Belarusian, 12.7% Yiddish, 9.9% Russian, 8.9% Polish, 1.8% Latvian and 0.1% German as their native language.
