= Vilna Governorate =

1795–1918 governorate of the Russian Empire

Coordinates: 54.6833°N 25.2833°E

Vilna Governorate: Виленская губерния (Russian); Vilniaus gubernija (Lithuanian); Gubernia wileńska (Polish)
- Governorate
- Coat of arms

- Location in the Russian Empire
- Country: Russian Empire
- Krai: Northwestern
- Established: 1795
- Abolished: 1918
- Capital: Vilnius

Area
  - Total: 41,907.9 km^{2} (16,180.7 sq mi)
- Highest elevation (Aukštojas Hill): 293.84 m (964.0 ft)

Population (1897)
  - Total: 1,591,207
  - Density: 37.9691/km^{2} (98.3396/sq mi)
  - Urban: 12.44%
  - Rural: 87.56%

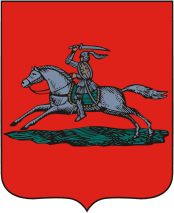
Coat of arms of the Vilna Governorate used since 1845

The Vilna Governorate (Note: Russian: Ви́ленская губе́рния, pre-reform orthography: Ви́ленская губе́рнія, romanized: Vílenskaya gubérniya; Belarusian: Ві́ленская губе́рня, romanized: Vílenskaya hubérnya; Lithuanian: Vilniaus gubernija; Polish: Gubernia wileńska) was a province (guberniya) of the Northwestern Krai of the Russian Empire that existed from 1795 to 1918. Established after the Third Partition of the Polish–Lithuanian Commonwealth, it encompassed territories of the former Grand Duchy of Lithuania and was one of the administrative divisions created by the Russian Empire to replace the institutions of the dissolved Polish–Lithuanian Commonwealth.

In 1897, the governorate covered an area of 41,907.9 square kilometres (16,180.7 mi^{2}) and had a population of 1,591,207 inhabitants. It bordered the following governorates: Minsk to the south, Grodno to the southwest, Suwałki to the west, Kovno and Courland to the north, and Vitebsk to the east. Its capital, Vilnius, also served as the seat of the Vilna Governorate-General, which existed until 1912.

== History ==
Following the Third Partition of the Polish–Lithuanian Commonwealth in 1795, the former lands of the Grand Duchy of Lithuania (themselves part of the Polish–Lithuanian Commonwealth) were annexed by the Russian Empire. The Russians established two administrative units: the Vilnius Governorate and the Slonim Governorate. On 12 December 1796, by order of Tsar Paul I, these were merged into a single administrative unit called the Lithuania Governorate, with its capital in Vilnius.

On 9 September 1801, Tsar Alexander I divided the Lithuanian Governorate into two: the Lithuania Vilnius Governorate and the Lithuania Grodno Governorate. Around 1840–1843, during the administrative reforms of Tsar Nicholas I, the word "Lithuania" was officially erased from both names and the Vilna Governorate and Grodno Governorate were established.

In 1843, another reform created the new Kovno Governorate out of seven western districts of the Vilna Governorate, including most of Samogitia. In exchange, the Vilna Governorate received the districts of Vileyka and Dzisna from the Minsk Governorate and Lida from the Grodno Governorate. Thereafter, the Vilna Governorate consisted of the districts of Vilnius, Trakai, Dzisna, Ashmyany, Lida, Vileyka and Švenčionys. This administrative structure remained in place until the outbreak of World War I, when the region came under German occupation as part of the Ober Ost military administration.

Maps of the Vilna Governorate

Vilna Governorate (light green), 1795–97, with modern Lithuania outlined

Vilna Governorate (light green), 1843–1915, with modern Lithuania outlined

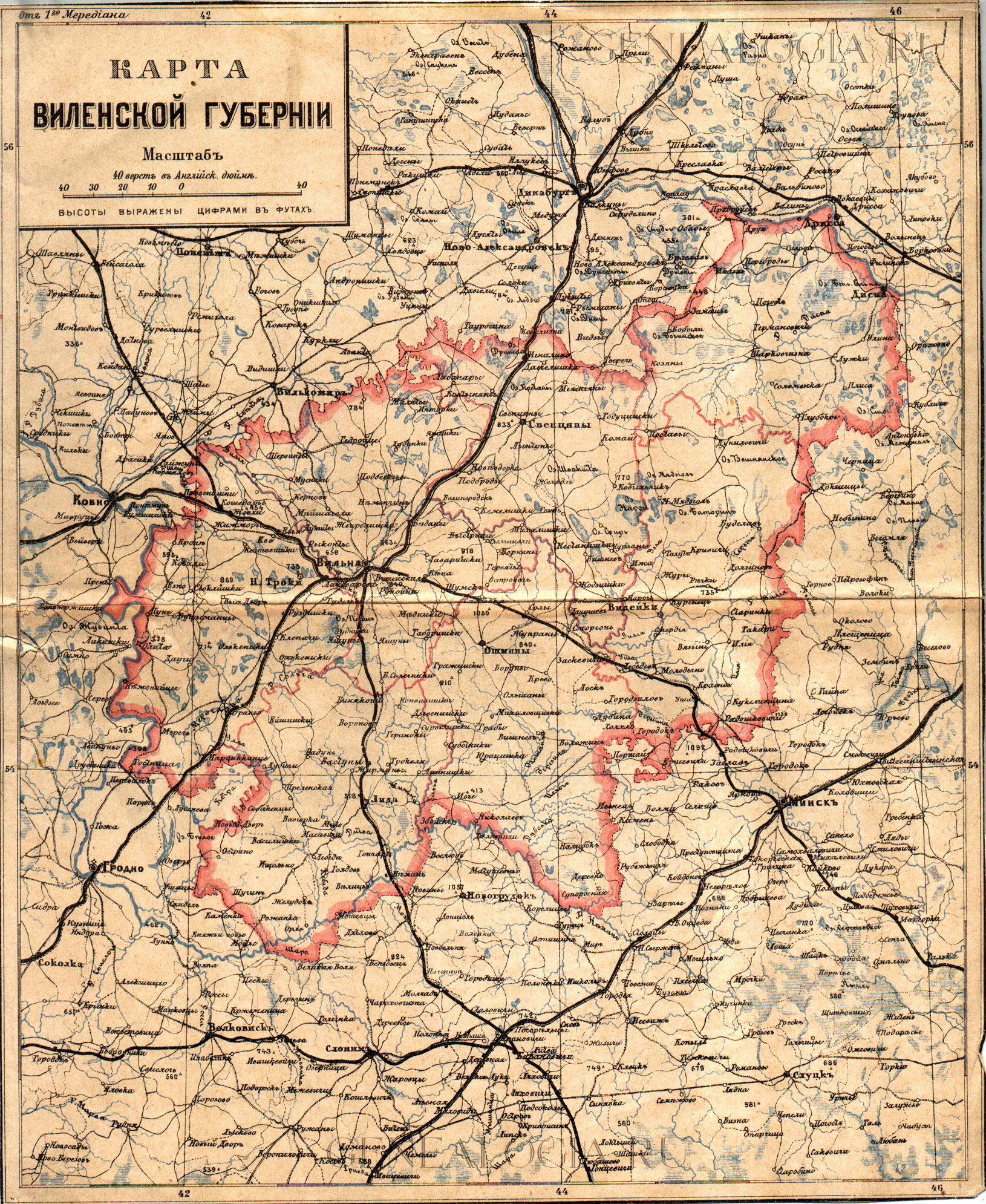
Vilna Governorate in 1897

== Demographics ==
=== Plater's statistics of 1825 ===
Count Stanisław Plater was the first one in 1825 to publish approximate statistics on the ethnic makeup of the Vilnius Governorate, which then included most, but not all, of Lithuania. His work's purpose was to show the area's indicative ethnic composition. In the case of the Vilnius Governorate, before a major redrawing of the governorate's borders in 1843, he concluded that it was majority Lithuanian.

Stanisław Plater's statistics in 1825
Language	People	Percentage of total
Lithuanian	780,000	65%
Yiddish	180,000	15%
Polish	100,000	8,3%
Russians	80,000	6,7%
Ruthenians	50,000	4,2%
Tatars	10,000	0,8%
Total	1,200,000	100%

Due to the lack of systematic primary data on nationalities, Plater resorted to comparing the revision censuses and religious distribution statistics to provide the general statistics on the population's ethnic distribution. He referred to nobles and townspeople, with the exception of soldiers and Jews, as Poles, whereas he separated the peasants into Lithuanians, Ruthenians, or Russians (which refers to the Old Believers). Overall, the total number of Catholics in the Vilnius Governorate was 930,000, i.e. ¾ of the population.

Plater's ethnic and social classification of the population also reflected the contemporary thought among the elite classes, where in addition to a class difference, an ethnic dividing line was also drawn compared to the lower classes. Thus, Plater categorically renamed the Lithuanians of the traditional political Lithuanian nation as Poles, whereas the lower classes in his view were termed as Lithuanians. A similar attitude could be found elsewhere in Europe, for example, the Hungarian nobility called itself as Natio Hungarica, in contrast to the commoners they called Magyars.

In 1856, a clear example of the ethno-social alienation between a Polish-speaking Lithuanian noble and a Lithuanian-speaking peasant was documented when the poet and writer Władysław Syrokomla, who traditionally considered himself a Lithuanian, traveled through the Dūkštos parish. Somewhere between the Geišiškės and Europa estates, Syrokomla spoke to a villager in Polish, but the latter replied in Lithuanian that he did not understand him, upon which Syrokomla disappointedly exclaimed that: "A Lithuanian in a Lithuanian land could not speak to a Lithuanian".

=== Russian Empire Census ===
According to the Russian Empire census on 28 January [O.S. 16 January] 1897, The Vilna Governorate had a population of 1,591,207, including 790,880 men and 800,327 women. According to the census, the majority of the population indicated Belarusian to be their mother tongue, which followed by a significant Lithuanian and Jewish speakers.

Linguistic composition of the Vilna Governorate in 1897
Language	Native speakers	Percentage
White Russian (Note: Prior to 1918, the Imperial Russian Government classified Russians as the Great Russians, Ukrainians as the Little Russians, and Belarusians as the White Russians. After the creation of the Ukrainian People's Republic in 1917 and the Belarusian Democratic Republic in 1918, the Little Russians and the White Russians identified themselves as "Ukrainians" and "Belarusians" respectively.)	891,903	56.05
Lithuanian	279,720	17.58
Jewish	202,374	12.72
Polish	130,054	8.17
Great Russian	78,623	4.94
German	3,873	0.24
Tatar	1,969	0.12
Little Russian	919	0.06
Latvian	471	0.03
Gypsi	182	0.01
Others	1,119	0.07
Total	1,591,207	100.00

Religious composition of the Vilna Governorate in 1897
Faith	Male	Female	Both	
Faith	Male	Female	Number	Percentage
Roman Catholic	460,627	475,222	935,849	58.81
Eastern Orthodox	214,225	201,070	415,295	26.10
Judaism	98,193	106,493	204,686	12.86
Old Believer	12,686	12,987	25,673	1.61
Lutheranism	2,172	2,291	4,463	0.28
Islam	2,572	1,803	4,375	0.27
Karaite	251	325	576	0.04
Reformed	92	85	177	0.01
Armenian Catholic	22	25	47	0.00
Armenian Apostolic	9	3	12	0.00
Mennonite	2	0	2	0.00
Anglican	0	2	2	0.00
Other Christian denomination	19	16	35	0.00
Other non-Christian denomination	10	4	14	0.00
Total	790,880	800,327	1,591,207	100.00

== Subdivisions ==
The counties (uezd) of the Vilna Governorate in 1897 was composed of seven uezds as follows:

County		Capital and the largest city		Arms of capital	Area	Population (1897 census)
Transliteration name	Russian Cyrillic		1897	Arms of capital	Area	Population (1897 census)
Vileyskiy	Вилейскій	Vileyka	3.560		6,363.13 km^{2} (2,456.82 mi^{2})	208,013
Vilenskiy	Виленскій	Vilna	154.132		6,185.14 km^{2} (2,388.10 mi^{2})	363,313
Disnenskiy	Дисненскій	Disna	6.756		5,779.30 km^{2} (2,231.40 mi^{2})	204,923
Lidskiy	Лидскій	Lida	9.323		5,606.20 km^{2} (2,164.57 mi^{2})	205,767
Oshmyanskiy	Ошмянскій	Oshmyany	7.214		6,885.39 km^{2} (2,658.46 mi^{2})	233,559
Smorgonskiy	Сморгонскій	Smorgon	---		5,979.20 km^{2} (2,308.58 mi^{2})	241,565
Sventsyanskiy	Свѣнцянскій	Sventsyany	6.025		5,228.03 km^{2} (2,018.55 mi^{2})	172,231
Trokskiy	Трокскій	Troki	3.240		5,862.27 km^{2} (2,263.44 mi^{2})	203,401

== Ethnic composition ==
Russian authorities periodically performed censuses. However, they reported strikingly different numbers:

Year	Total	Lithuanians		Poles		Belarusians		Russians		Jews		Other	
1862	838,464	418,880	50%	154,386	18%	146,431	17%	14,950	2%	76,802	9%	27,035	3%
1865	891,715	210,273	24%	154,386	17%	418,289	47%	27,845	3%	76,802	9%	4,120	0%
1883	1,192,000	417,200	35%	281,312	24%	239,592	20%	—N/a		176,416	15%	77,480	7%
1897	1,561,713	274,414	18%	126,770	8%	880,940	56%	75,803	5%	197,929	13%	5,857	0%
1909	1,550,057	231,848	15%	188,931	12%	570,351	37%	408,817	26%	146,066	9%	4,094	0%

== Governors ==
Name	In office
Yakov Bulgarov	1797–1799
Ivan Friesell	1799–1801
Dmitry Lanskoy	1802–1804
Ivan Rickman	1804–1806
Prokopy Bogmevsky	1806–1808
Nikolay Brusilov	1808–1810
Aleksandr Lavinsky	1811–1816
Friedrich Drutsky-Lyubetsky	1816–1823
Pyotr Gorn	1823–1830
Dmitry Obreskov	1830–1832
Grigory Doppelmayr	1832–1836
Dmitry Bantysh-Kamensky	1836–1838
Yuri Dolgorukov	1838–1840
Aleksey Semyonov	1840–1844
Nikolay Zherebtsov	1844–1846
Mikhail Begichev	1846–1851
Arkady Rosset	1851–1857
Mikhail Pokhvisnev	1857–1863
Ivan Galler	1863–1863
Stepan Panyutin	1863–1868
Ivan Shestakov	1868–1869
Yegor Steblin-Kamensky	1869–1882
Aleksandr Zhemchuzhnikov	1882–1885
Nikolay Grevenits	1885–1895
Aleksandr Frese	1895–1896
Ivan Cheplevsky	1896–1899
Nikolai Gruzinsky	1899–1901
Viktor Wahl	1901–1902
Konstantin Palen	1902–1905
Sergey Tatishchev	1905–1906
Dmitry Lyubimov	1906–1912
Pyotr Veryovkin	1912–1916
Aleksandr Tolstoy	1916–1917

== See also ==
- Demographic history of the Vilnius region
- History of Vilnius
- Wilno Voivodeship (1926–1939)
- Vileyka Region

== Sources ==
- Merkys, Vytautas (2004). "Vilniaus Vyskupija 1795–1864 m.: Nuo politinės link kultūrinės tautos" [Vilnius Diocese 1795–1864: From a political to a cultural nation] (PDF). Lietuvių Katalikų Mokslo Akademijos Metraštis (in Lithuanian). 24. Vilnius.
- Merkys, Vytautas (2006). Tautiniai santykiai Vilniaus vyskupijoje 1798–1918 m. [National relations in the Vilnius Diocese in 1798-1918] (in Lithuanian). Vilnius: Versus aureus. ISBN 9955-699-42-6.
- Plater, Stanisław (1825). Jeografia wschodniéy części Europy czyli Opis krajów przez wielorakie narody słowiańskie zamieszkanych : obejmujący Prussy, Xsięztwo Poznańskie, Szląsk Pruski, Gallicyą, Rzeczpospolitę Krakowską, Krolestwo Polskie i Litwę [Geography of the Eastern Part of Europe, or Description of the Countries inhabited by Various Slavic Nations: Including Prussia, the Duchy of Posen, Prussian Silesia, Galicia, the Republic of Cracow, the Kingdom of Poland, and Lithuania] (in Polish). Wrocław: Wilhelm Bogumił Korn.
