= Northwestern Krai =

Unofficial region of the Russian Empire

Coordinates: 54°N 26°E

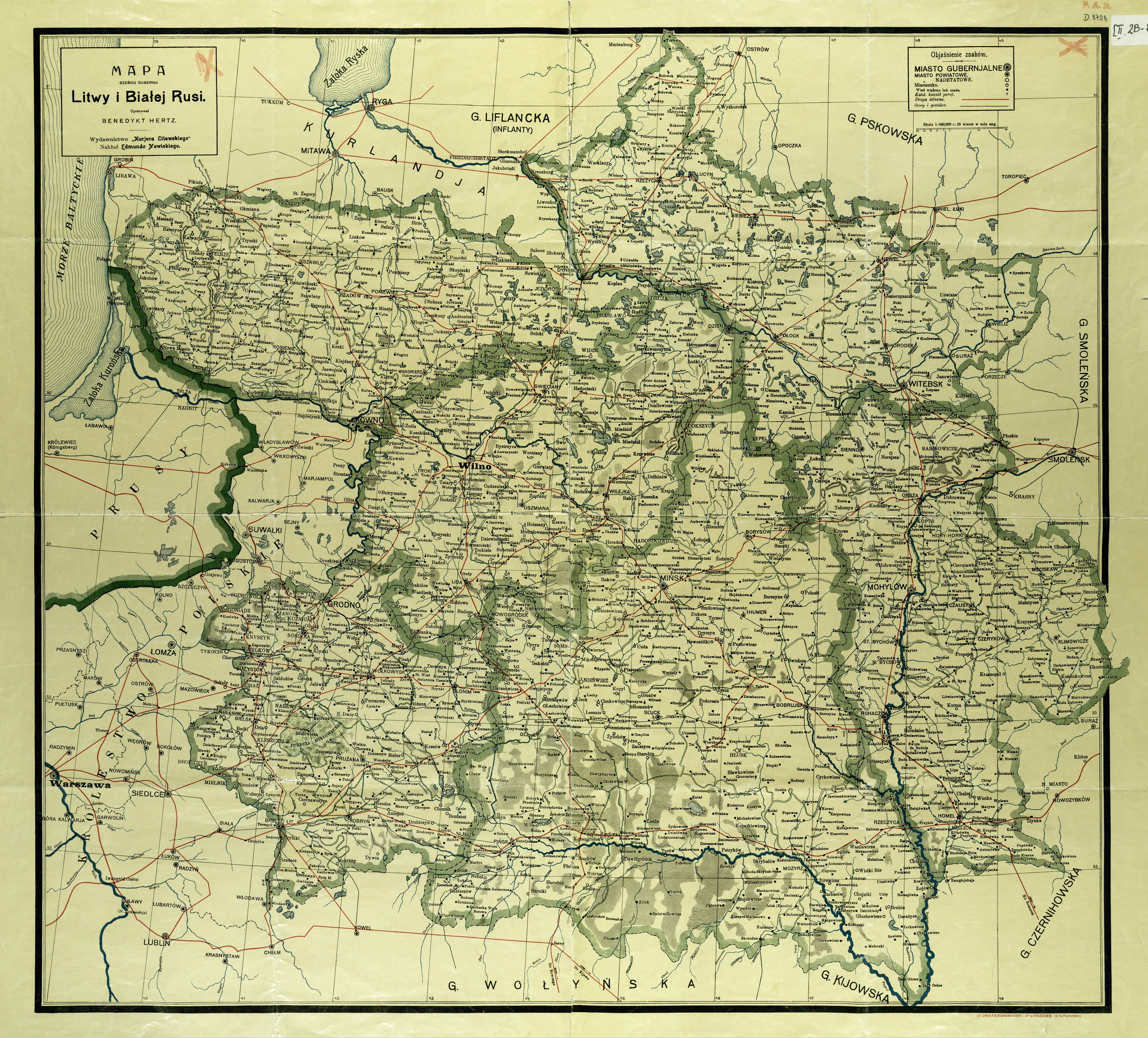
Northwestern Krai of the Russian Empire

Northwestern Krai (Russian: Северо-Западный край) was a krai of the Russian Empire (unofficial subdivision) in the territories of the former Grand Duchy of Lithuania (present-day Belarus and Lithuania). The administrative center was in Vilna (now Vilnius). Northwestern Krai together with the Southwestern Krai, which was composed of the territories formerly belonging to the Crown of the Kingdom of Poland (now present-day Ukraine), formed the Western Krai.

It included six Governorates:

- Vilna Governorate-General:
  - Vilna Governorate
  - Kovno Governorate
  - Grodno Governorate
- Minsk Governorate
- Mogilev Governorate
- Vitebsk Governorate

== See also ==
- Southwestern Krai
- Western Krai
