= Kovno Governorate =

1843–1918 unit of Russia

Coordinates: 54.9000°N 23.9333°E

Kovno Governorate: Ковенская губерния (Russian); Kauno gubernija (Lithuanian)
- Governorate
- Coat of arms

- Location in the Russian Empire
- Country: Russian Empire
- Krai: Northwestern
- Established: 1843
- Abolished: 1918
- Capital: Kovno

Area
  - Total: 40,641.36 km^{2} (15,691.72 sq mi)

Population (1897)
  - Total: 1,544,564
  - Density: 38.00473/km^{2} (98.43180/sq mi)

Kovno Governorate (Note: Russian: Ко́венская губе́рния, pre-1918: Ко́венская губе́рнія, romanized: Kóvenskaya gubérniya; Lithuanian: Kauno gubernija) was an administrative-territorial unit (guberniya) of the Russian Empire, with its capital in Kovno (Kaunas). It was formed on 18 December 1842 by Tsar Nicholas I from the western part of Vilna Governorate, and the order was carried out on 1 July 1843. It was part of the Vilna Governorate-General and Northwestern Krai. The governorate included almost the entire Lithuanian region of Samogitia and the northern part of Aukštaitija.

== Counties ==
The governorate was divided into seven uyezds:

| County | County Seat | | Area (km^{2}) | Population in 1897 | Population in 1914 |
| | | 1897 | | | |
|---|---|---|---|---|---|
| Kovensky Uyezd | Kovno | 70.920 | 4,029 | 227,431 | 301,800 |
| Novoalexandrovsky Uyezd | Novoaleksandrovsk | 6.359 | 5,437 | 208,487 | 242,300 |
| Ponevezhsky Uyezd | Ponevezh | 12.968 | 6,215 | 222,881 | 259,700 |
| Rossiyensky Uyezd | Rossiyeny | 7.455 | 6,485 | 235,362 | 279,200 |
| Shavelsky Uyezd | Shavli | 16.128 | 6,922 | 237,934 | 294,500 |
| Telshevsky Uyezd | Telshi | 6.205 | 5,306 | 183,351 | 216,000 |
| Vilkomirsky Uyezd | Vilkomir | 13.532 | 5,866 | 229,188 | 263,600 |
| Total | | | 40,260 | 1,544,564 | 1,857,100 |
