= Armorial of Ukraine =

The following gallery displays the historical and official coats of arms of Ukraine.

== State ==
Coat of Arms of Ukraine

== Regional ==
Autonomous Republic of Crimea

Cherkasy Oblast

Chernihiv Oblast

Chernivtsi Oblast

Dnipropetrovsk Oblast

Donetsk Oblast

Ivano-Frankivsk Oblast

Kharkiv Oblast

Kherson Oblast

Khmelnytskyi Oblast

Kyiv Oblast

Kirovohrad Oblast

Luhansk Oblast

Lviv Oblast

Mykolaiv Oblast

Odesa Oblast

Poltava Oblast

Rivne Oblast

Sumy Oblast

Ternopil Oblast

Vinnytsia Oblast

Volyn Oblast

Zakarpattia Oblast

Zaporizhzhia Oblast

Zhytomyr Oblast

Kyiv

Sevastopol

== Historical ==
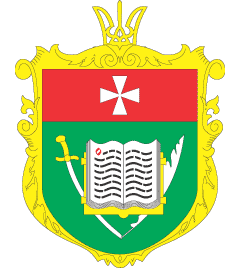
Rivne Oblast (2001–2005)

Ternopil Oblast (large coat of arms; 2001–2003)

Ternopil Oblast (small coat of arms; 2001–2003)

City of Sevastopol (1994–2000)

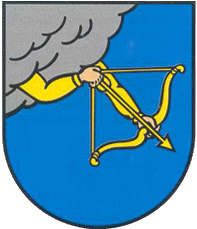
Coat of arms of Kyiv, mid 15th — end 16th century

Coat of arms of Kyiv, mid 17th — end 18th century

Coat of arms of Kyiv (Soviet period)
Seal of Sviatoslav I of Kyiv

Seal of Volodymyr the Great

Seal of Yaroslav the Wise

Coat of arms of Zaporizhian Host

Coat of arms of the Ukrainian State (1918)

Coat of arms of Carpathian Ruthenia

West Ukrainian People's Republic

Ukrainian People's Republic

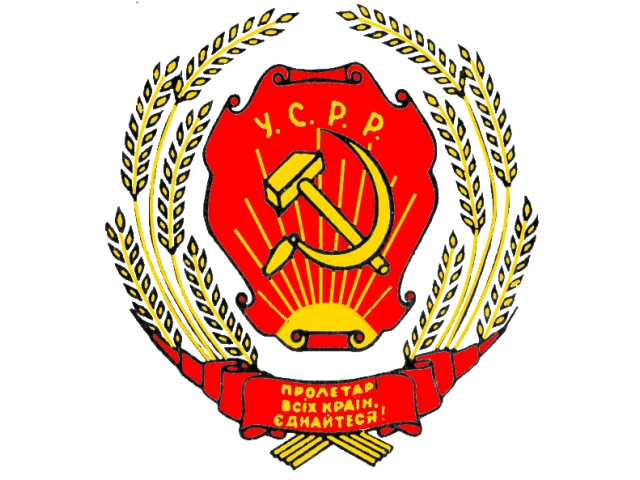
Ukrainian Soviet Socialist Republic 1919—1929

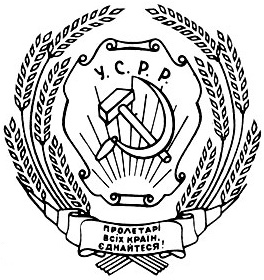
Ukrainian Soviet Socialist Republic 1929—1937

Ukrainian Soviet Socialist Republic 1937—1949

Ukrainian Soviet Socialist Republic 1949—1991

Ukraine 1991—1992

=== Coats of arms of the Kingdom of Galicia–Volhynia ===
Halych–Volhynia

Kyiv

Chernihiv

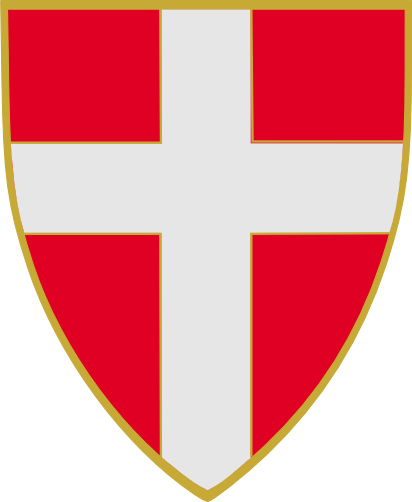
Volhynia

Peremyshl

Halych

Podolia

Belz

=== Coats of arms of the voivodeships of the Polish-Lithuanian Commonwealth ===
Belz Voivodeship

Brest Litovsk Voivodeship

Volhynian Voivodeship (1569–1795)

Ruthenian Voivodeship

Kyiv Voivodship

Podolian Voivodeship

Chernihiv Voivodeship

Bratslav Voivodeship

=== Coat of arms of the regiments of the Cossack Hetmanate ===
Chyhyryn Regiment

Korsun Regiment

Bila Tserkva Regiment

Kaniv Regiment

Pereiaslav Regiment

Kyiv Regiment

Myrhorod Regiment

Irkliiv Regiment

Borzna Regiment

Ichnia Regiment

Hadiach Regiment

Bratslav Regiment

Vinnytsia Regiment

Poltava Regiment

Lubny Regiment

Nizhyn Regiment

Pryluky Regiment

Chernihiv Regiment

Kropyvna Regiment

Starodub Regiment

Hlukhiv Regiment

Zinkiv Regiment

Bohuslav Regiment

Cherkasy Regiment

=== Coats of arms of the governorates of the Russian Empire in Ukraine ===
Volhynian Governorate

Yekaterinoslav Governorate

Kyiv Governorate

Podolia Governorate

Poltava Governorate

Tavria Governorate

Kharkov Governorate

Kherson Governorate

Kholm Governorate

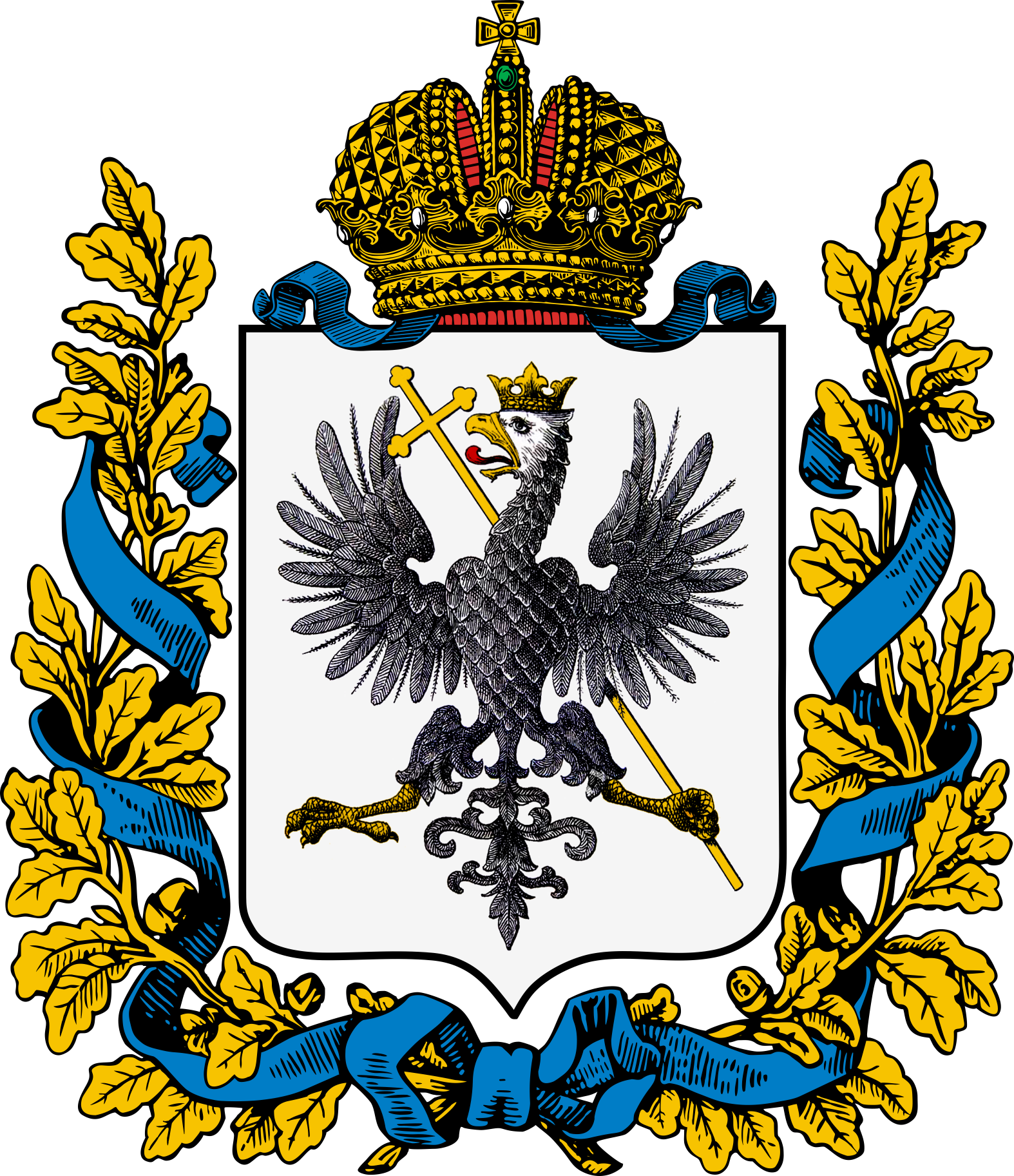
Chernigov Governorate

=== Coats of arms of the crownlands of the Austrian Empire in Ukraine ===
Kingdom of Galicia and Lodomeria

== Oblasts ==
=== Cherkasy Oblast ===
Cherkasy

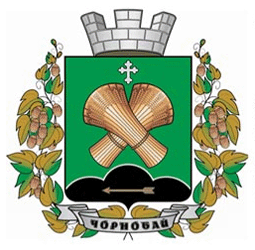
Chornobai

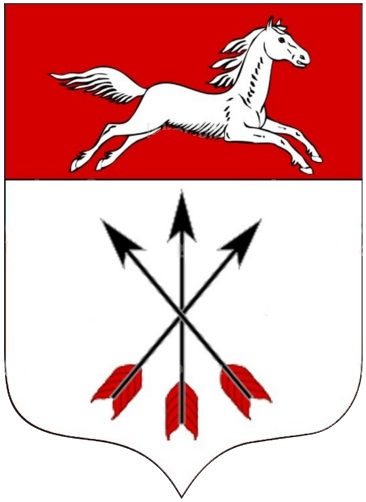
Chyhyryn

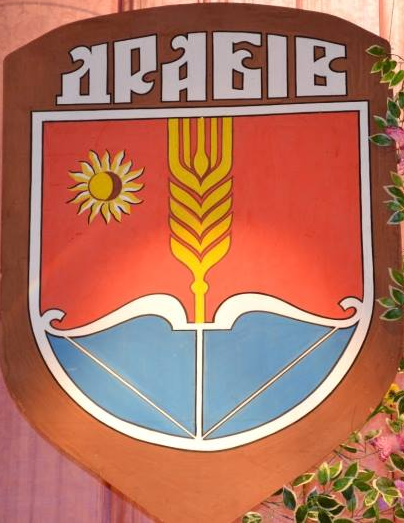
Drabiv

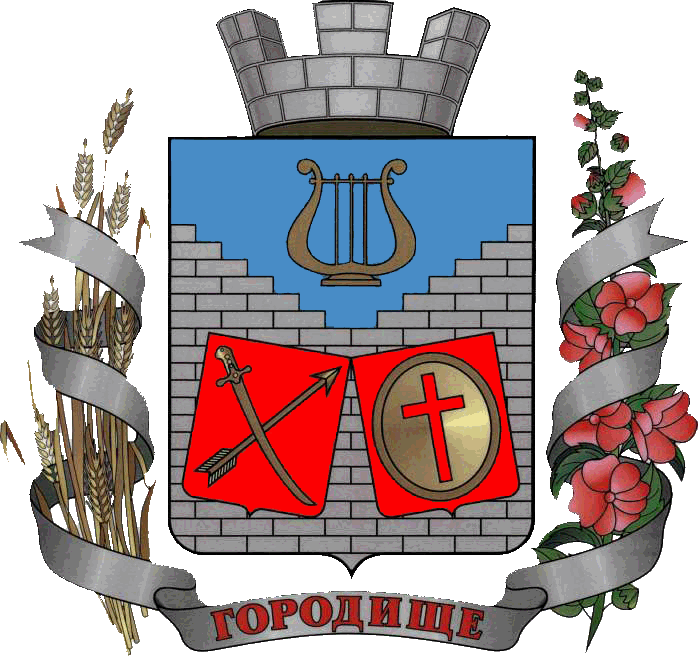
Horodyshche

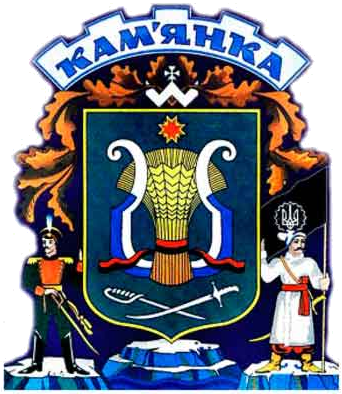
Kamianka

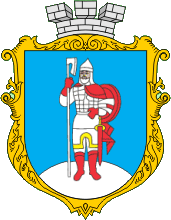
Kaniv

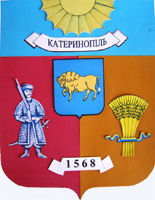
Katerynopil

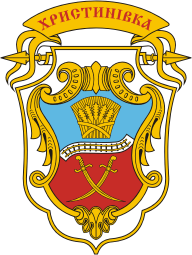
Khrystynivka

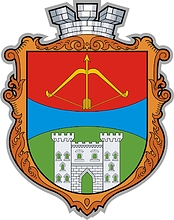
Korsun-Shevchenkivskyi

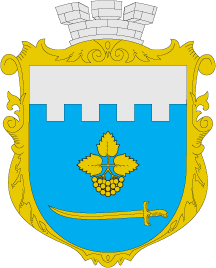
Lysianka

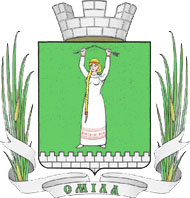
Smila

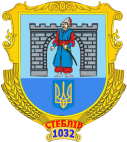
Stebliv

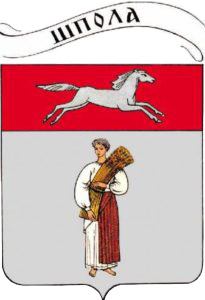
Shpola

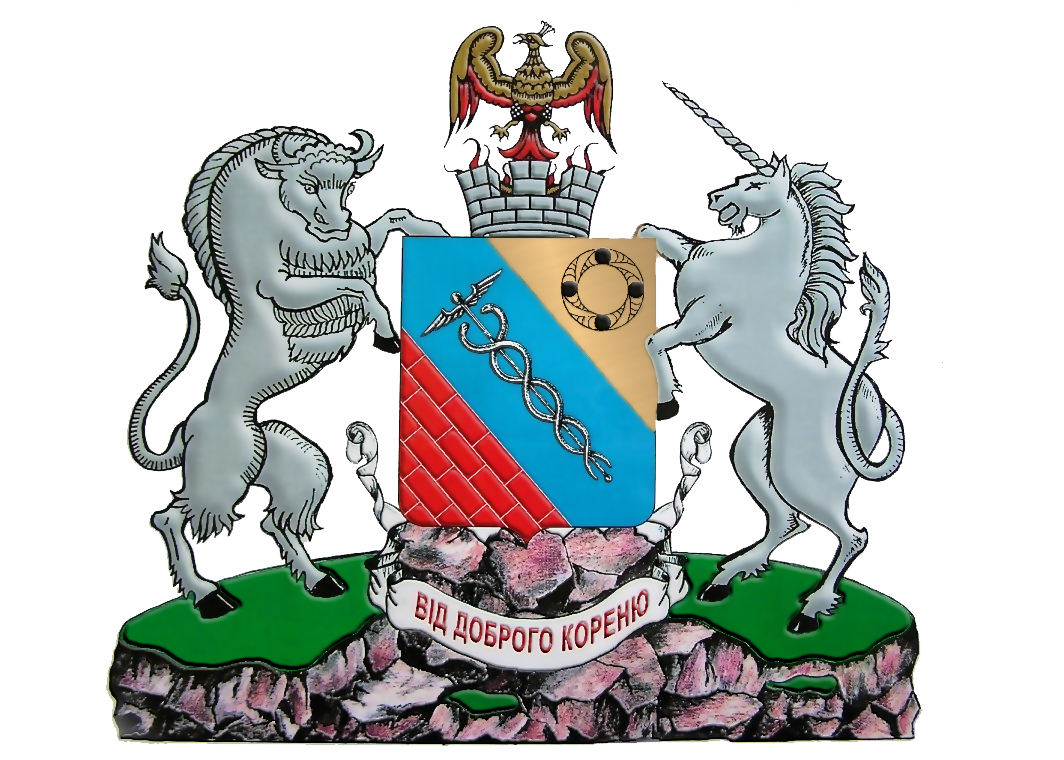
Talne

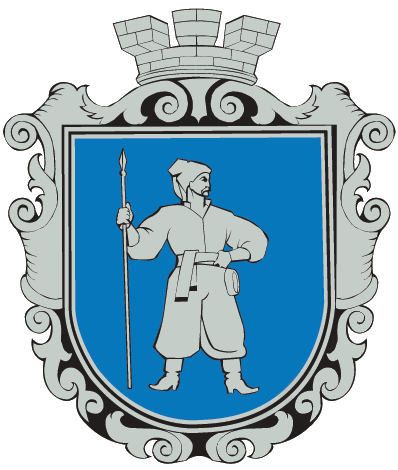
Uman

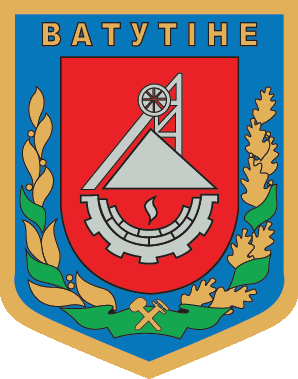
Vatutine

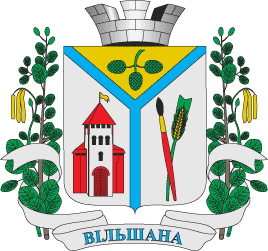
Vilshana

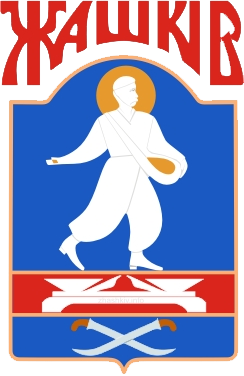
Zhashkiv

Zolotonosha

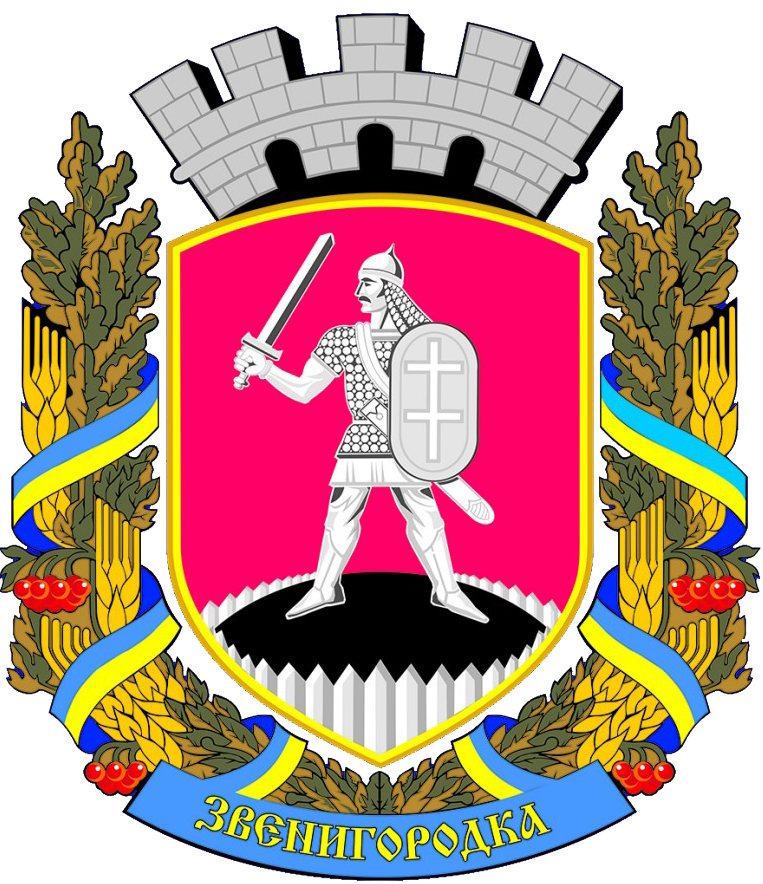
Zvenyhorodka

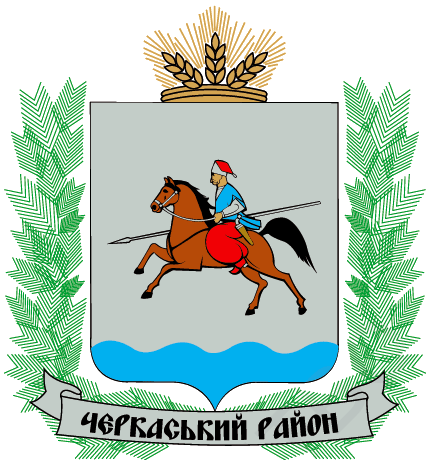
Cherkasy Raion

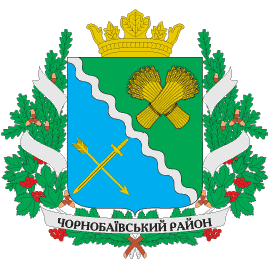
Chornobai Raion

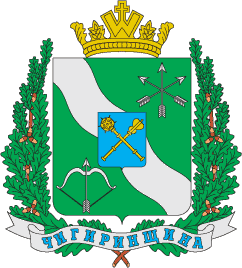
Chyhyryn Raion

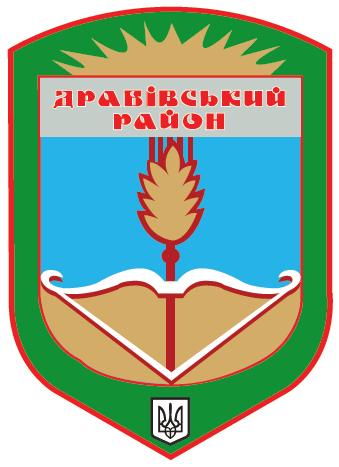
Drabiv Raion

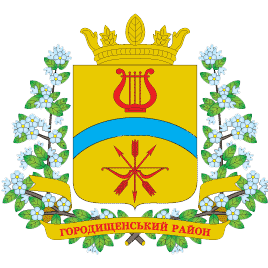
Horodyshche Raion

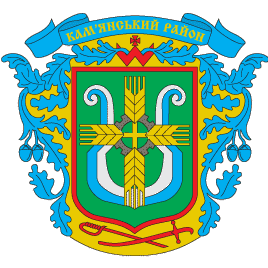
Kamianka Raion

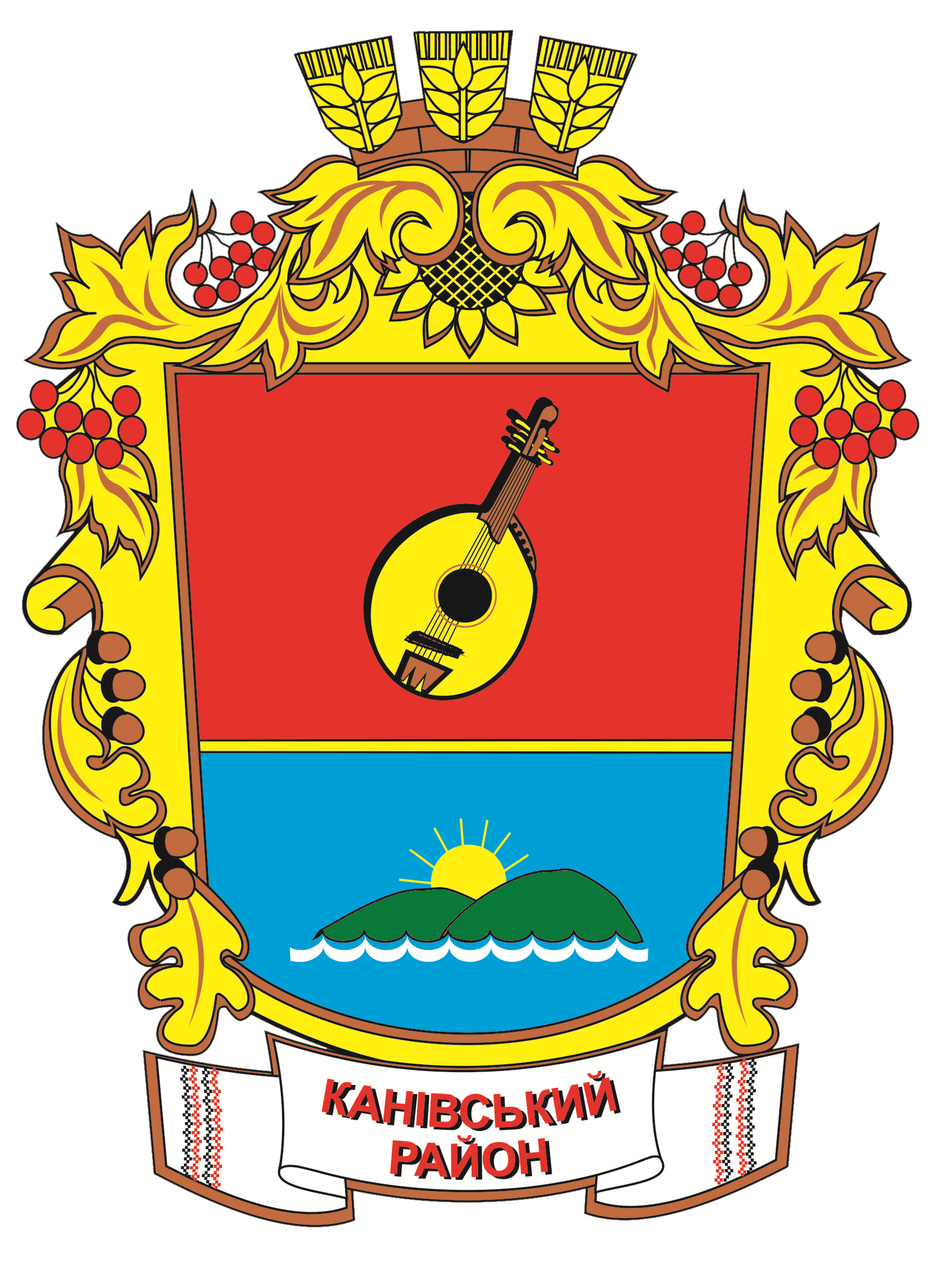
Kaniv Raion

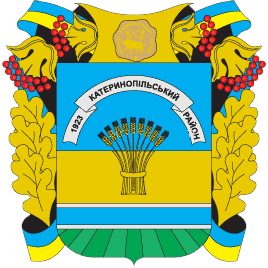
Katerynopil Raion

Khrystynivka Raion

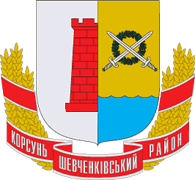
Korsun-Shevchenkivskyi Raion

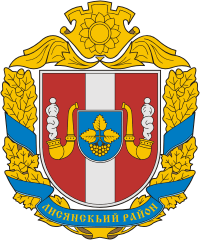
Lysianka Raion

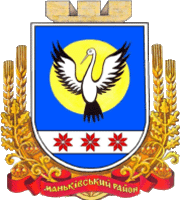
Mankivka Raion

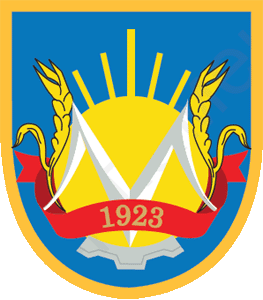
Monastyryshche Raion

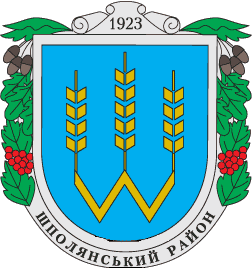
Shpola Raion

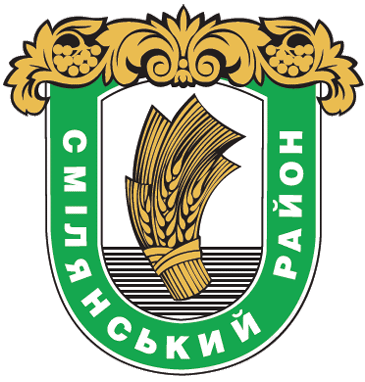
Smila Raion

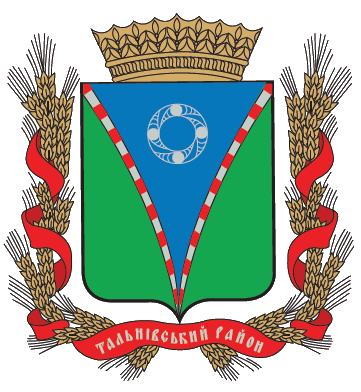
Talne Raion

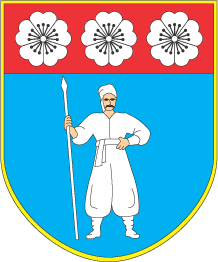
Uman Raion

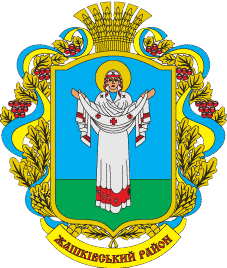
Zhashkiv Raion

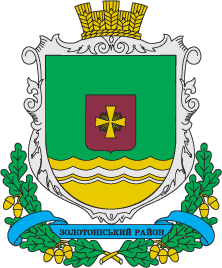
Zolotonosha Raion

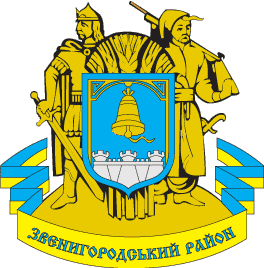
Zvenyhorodka Raion

=== Chernihiv Oblast ===
Chernihiv

Bakhmach

Baturyn

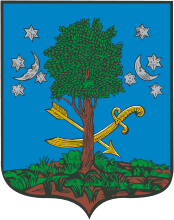
Berezna

Bobrovytsia

Borzna

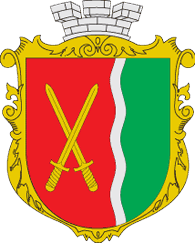
Desna

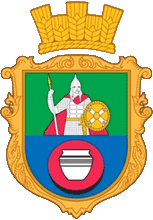
Honcharivske

Horodnia

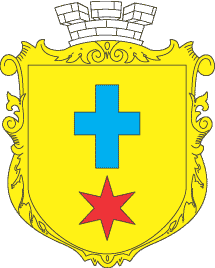
Ichnia

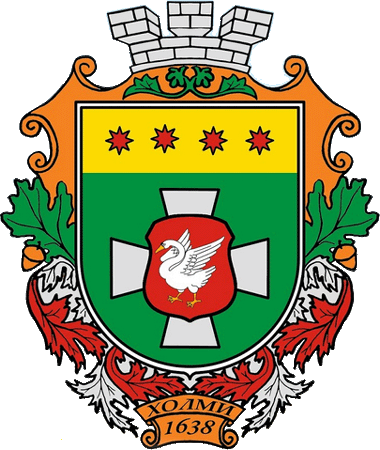
Kholmy

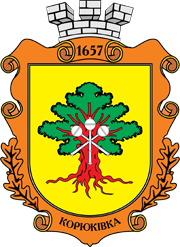
Koriukivka

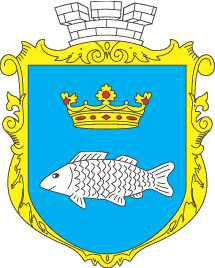
Korop

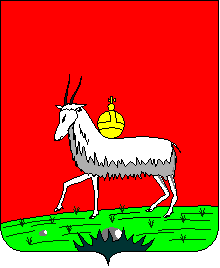
Kozelets

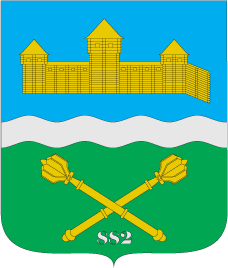
Liubech

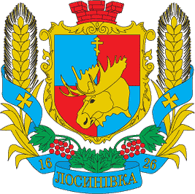
Losynivka

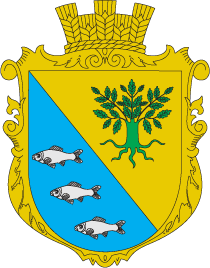
Lynovytsia

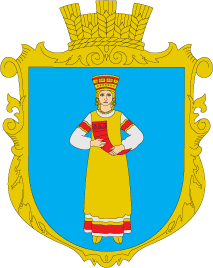
Makoshyne

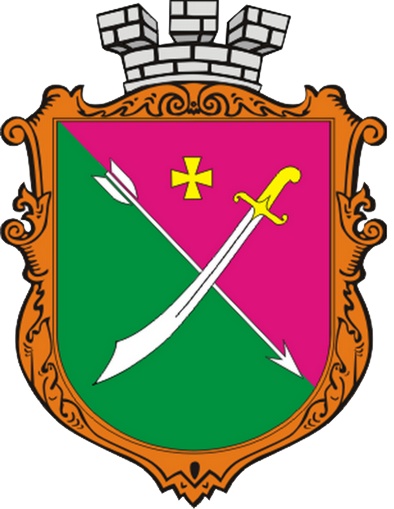
Mena

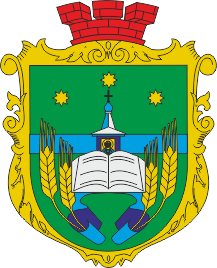
Mykhailo-Kotsiubynske

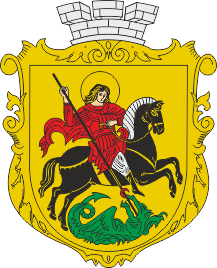
Nizhyn

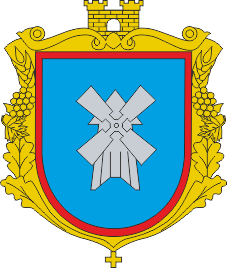
Nosivka

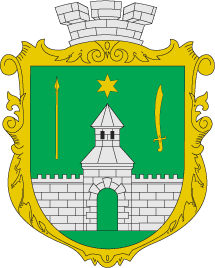
Novhorod-Siverskyi

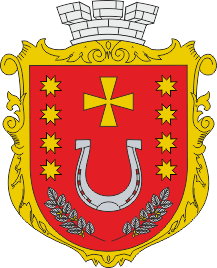
Olyshivka

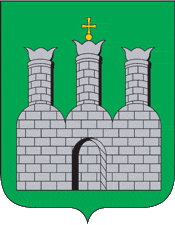
Oster

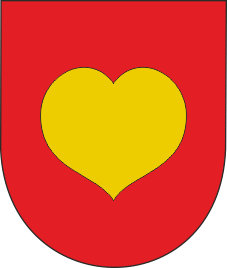
Ponornytsia

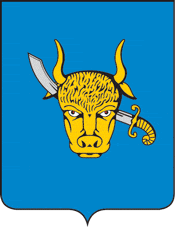
Pryluky

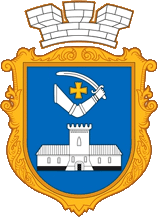
Sedniv

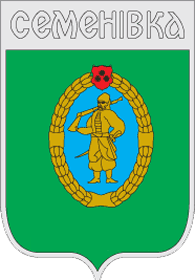
Semenivka

Snovsk

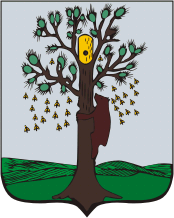
Sosnytsia

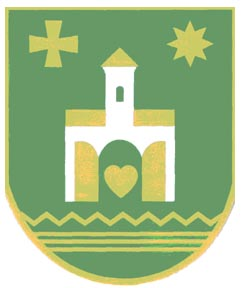
Talalaivka

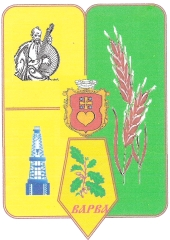
Varva

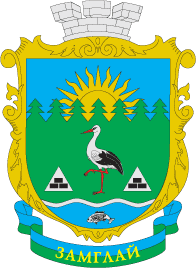
Zamhlai

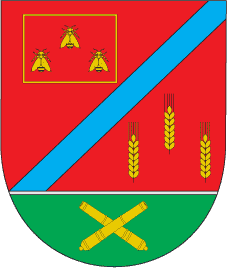
Bakhmach Raion

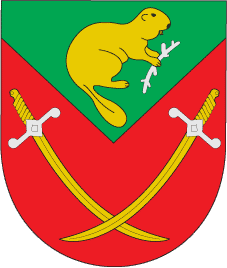
Bobrovytsia Raion

Borzna Raion

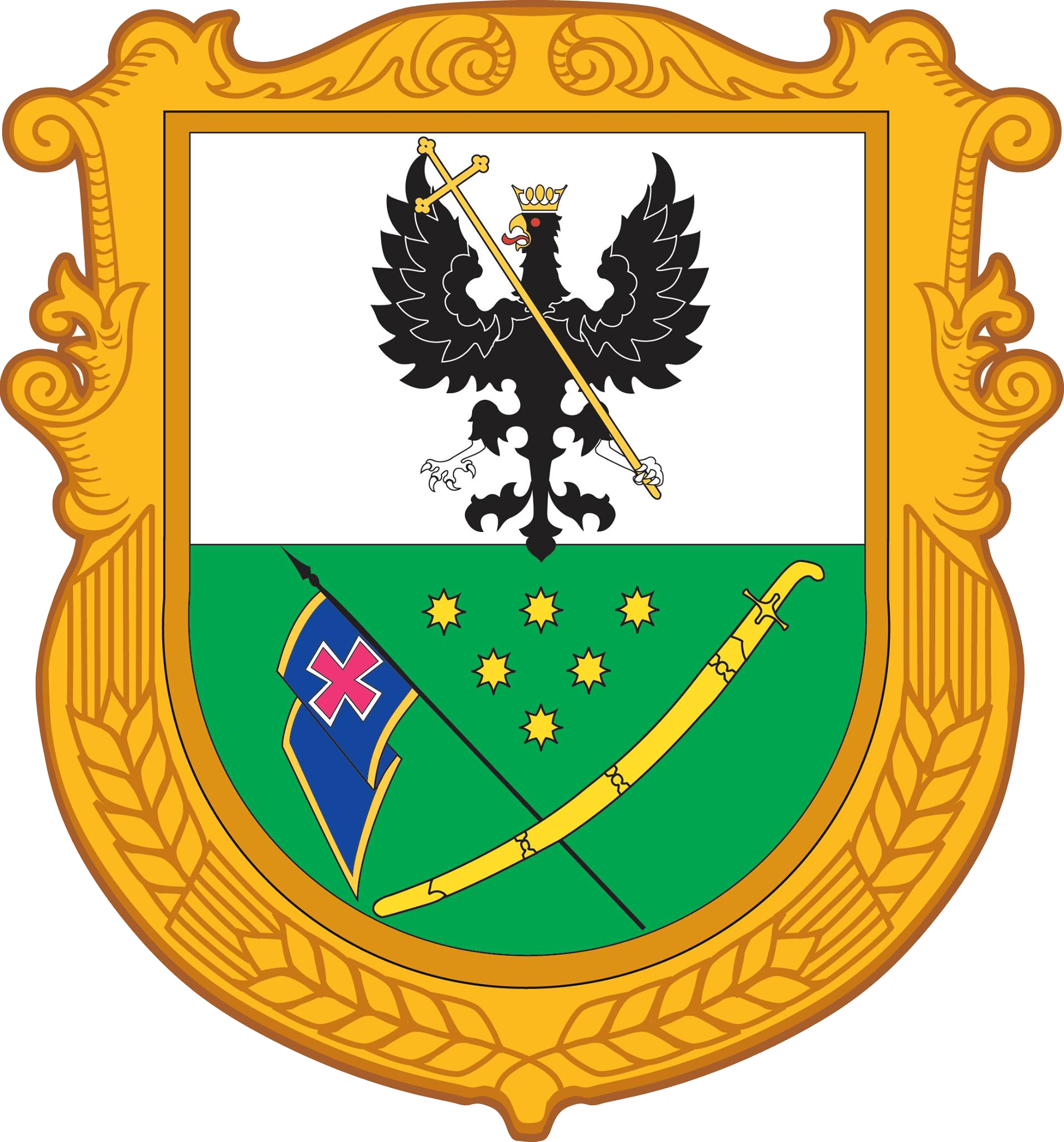
Chernihiv Raion

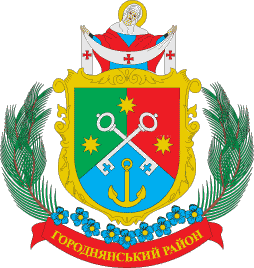
Horodnia Raion

Ichnia Raion

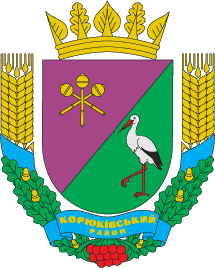
Koriukivka Raion

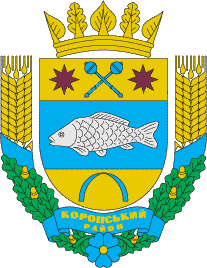
Korop Raion

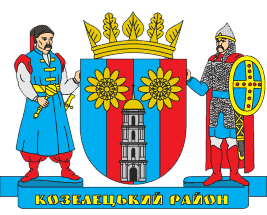
Kozelets Raion

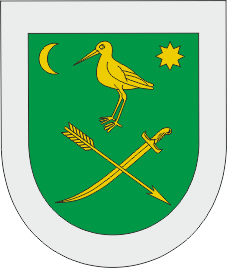
Kulykivka Raion

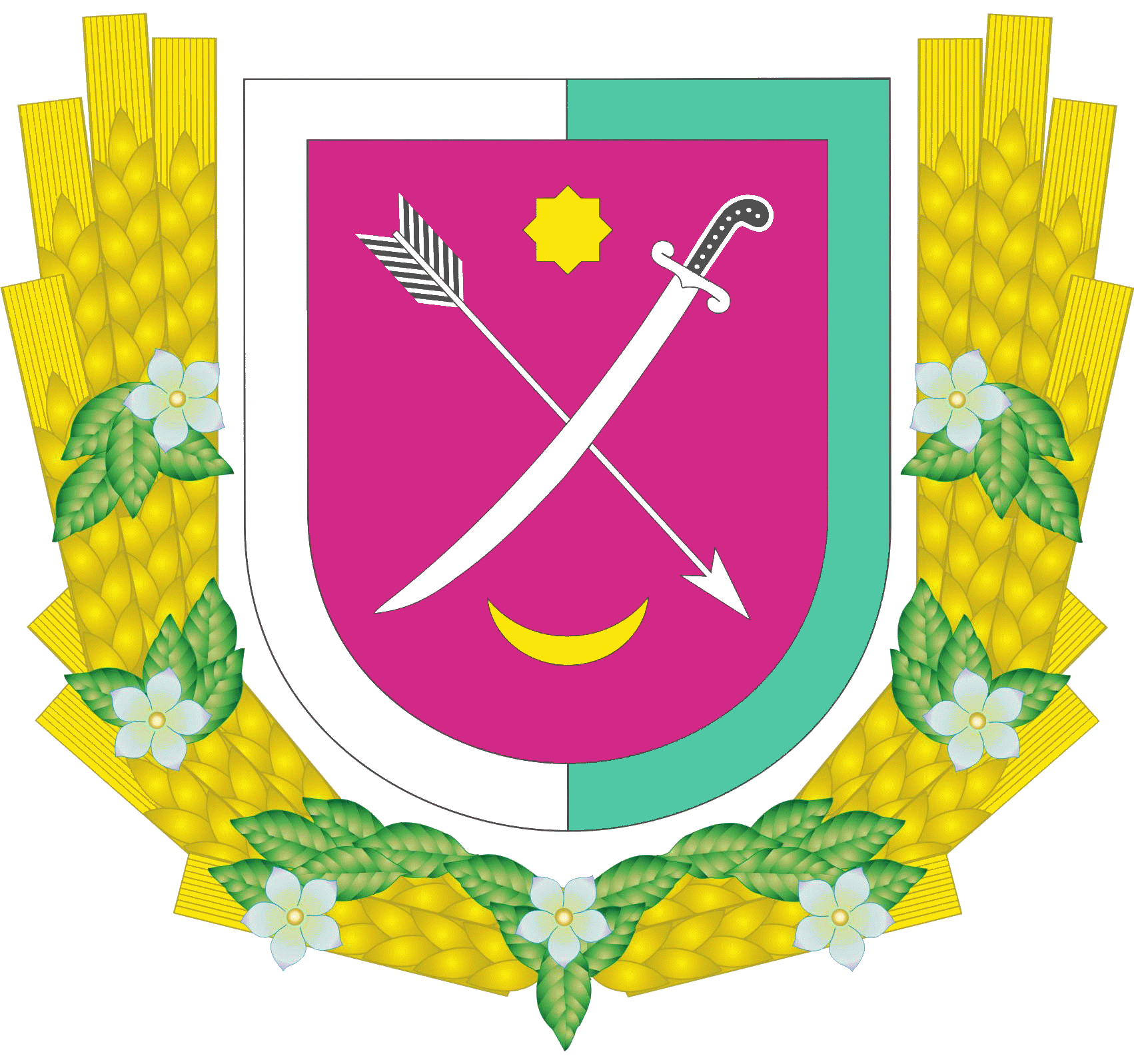
Mena Raion

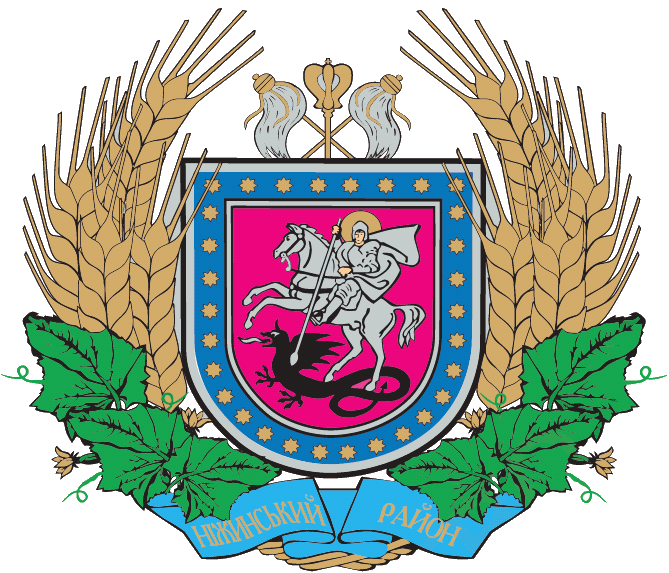
Nizhyn Raion

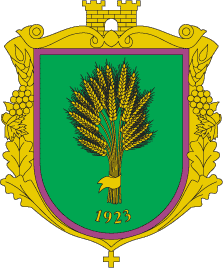
Nosivka Raion

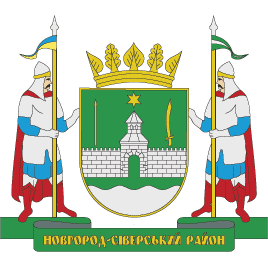
Novhorod-Siverskyi Raion

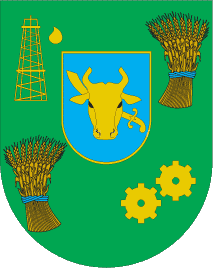
Pryluky Raion

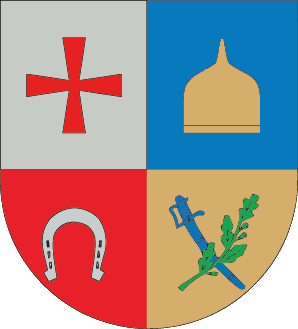
Ripky Raion

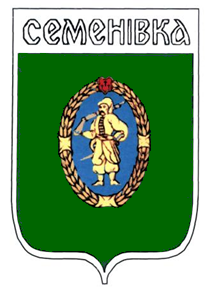
Semenivka Raion

Snovsk Raion

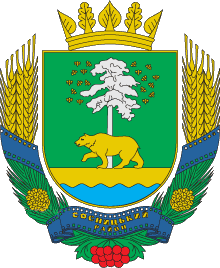
Sosnytsia Raion

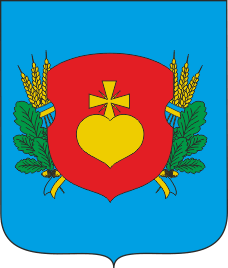
Sribne Raion

Talalaivka Raion

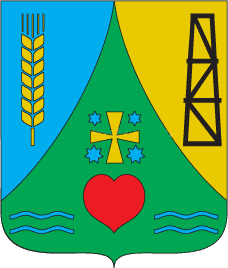
Varva Raion

=== Chernivtsi Oblast ===
Chernivtsi

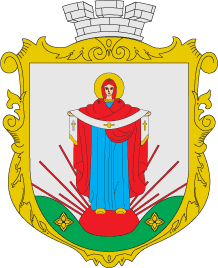
Hlyboka

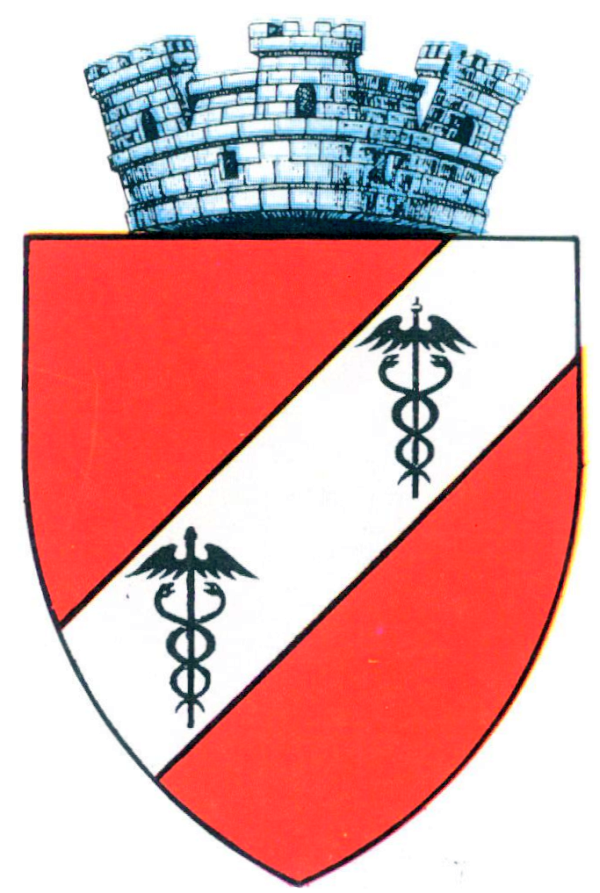
Hertsa

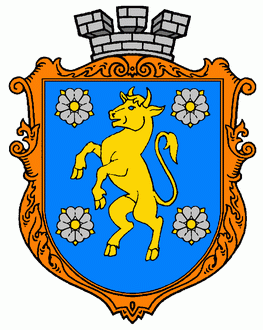
Kelmentsi

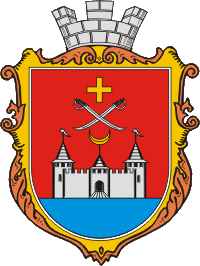
Khotyn

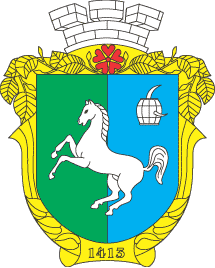
Kitsman

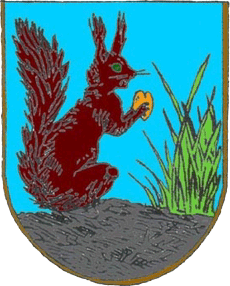
Krasnoilsk

Novodnistrovsk

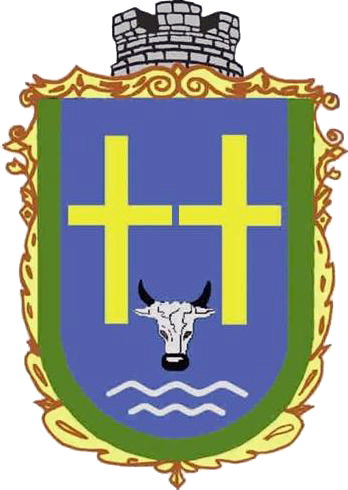
Novoselytsia

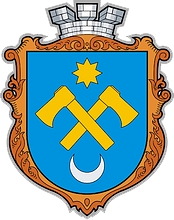
Sokyriany

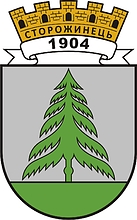
Storozhynets

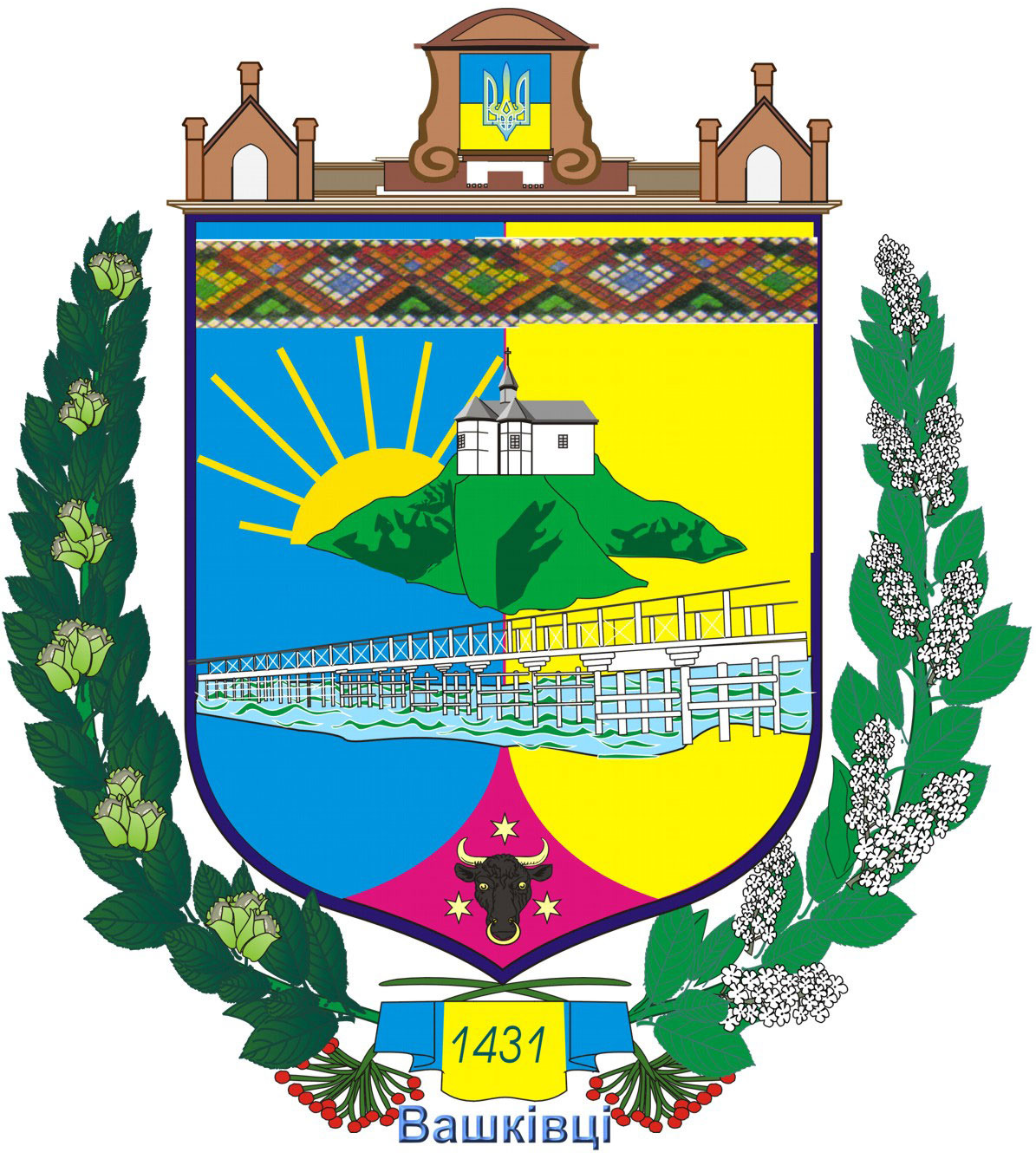
Vashkivtsi

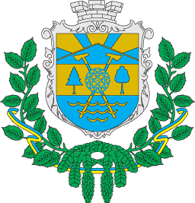
Vyzhnytsia

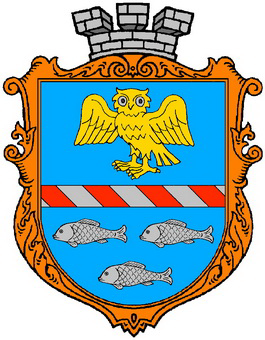
Zastavna

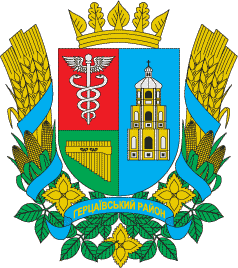
Hertsa Raion

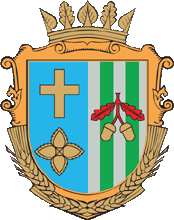
Hlyboka Raion

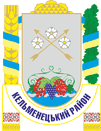
Kelmentsi Raion

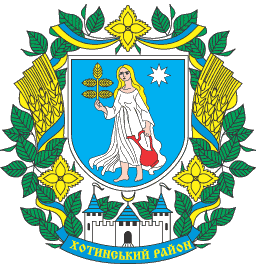
Khotyn Raion

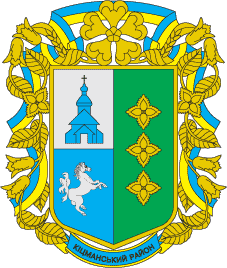
Kitsman Raion

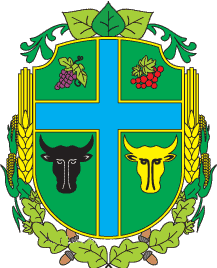
Novoselytsia Raion

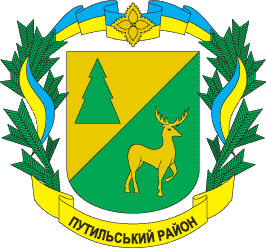
Putyla Raion

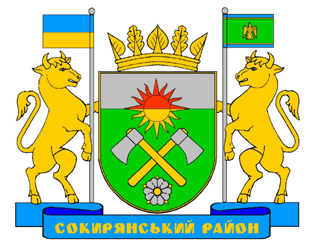
Sokyriany Raion

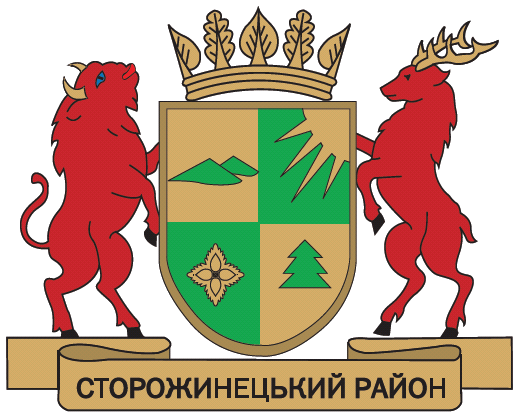
Storozhynets Raion

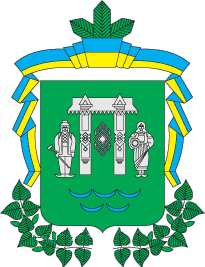
Vyzhnytsia Raion

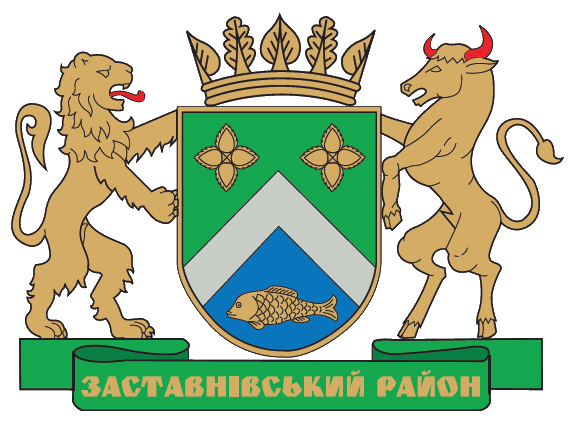
Zastavna Raion

=== Dnipropetrovsk Oblast ===
Dnipro

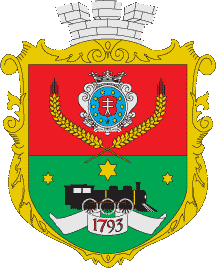
Apostolove

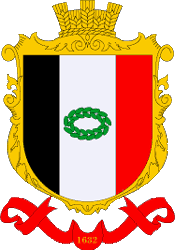
Auly

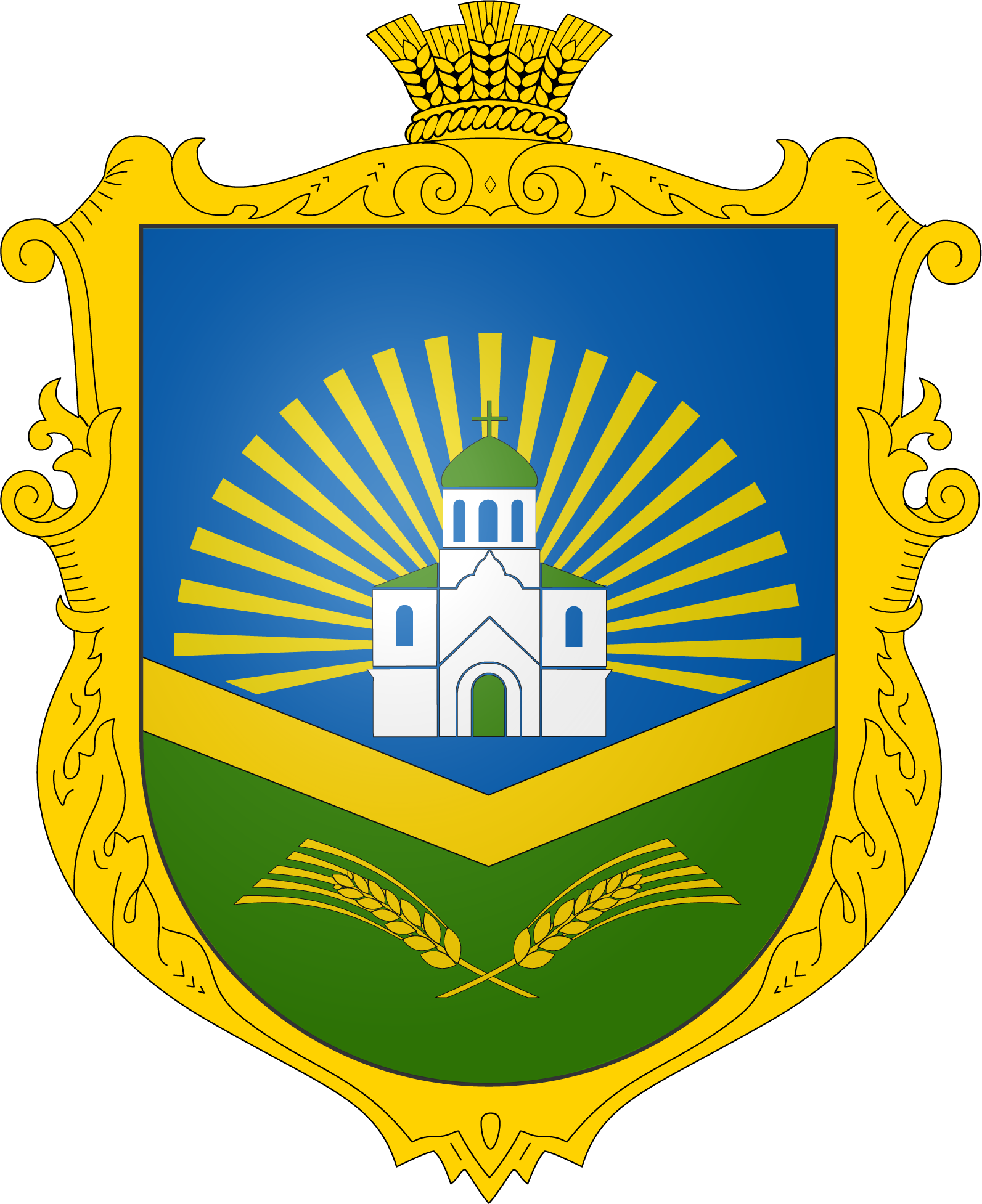
Bozhedarivka

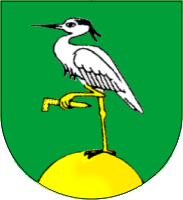
Chaplyne

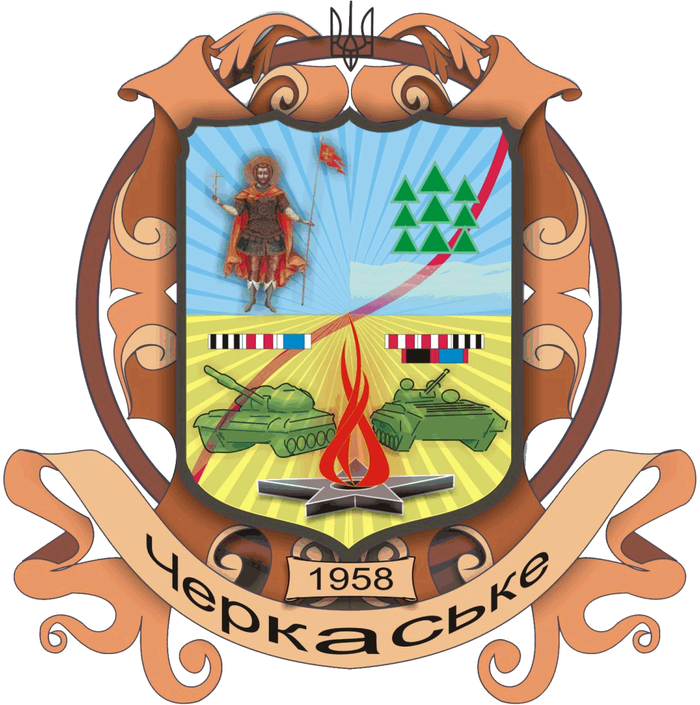
Cherkaske

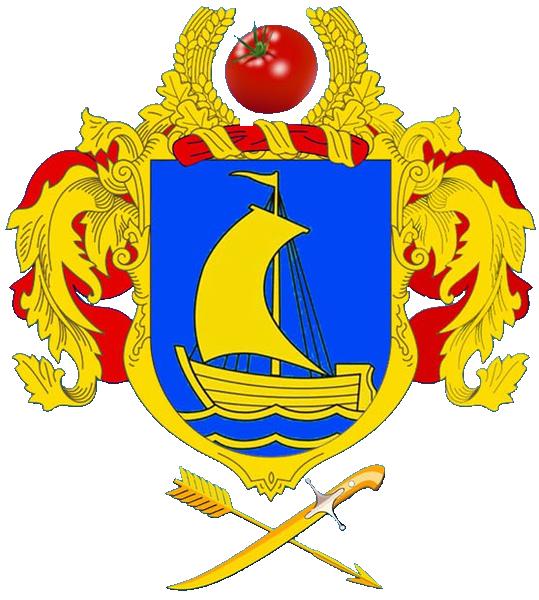
Chervonohryhorivka

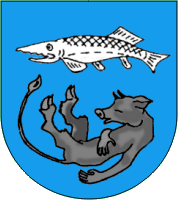
Chortomlyk

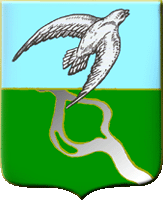
Dniprovske

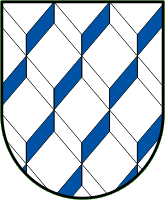
Hubynykha

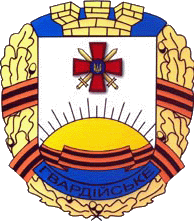
Hvardiiske

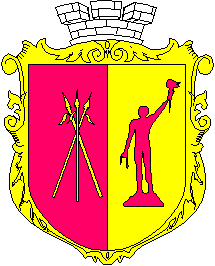
Kamianske

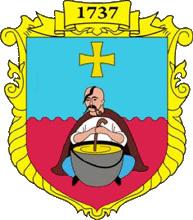
Karnaukhivka

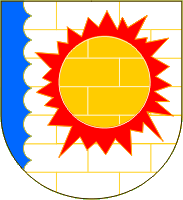
Khrystoforivka

Kryvyi Rih

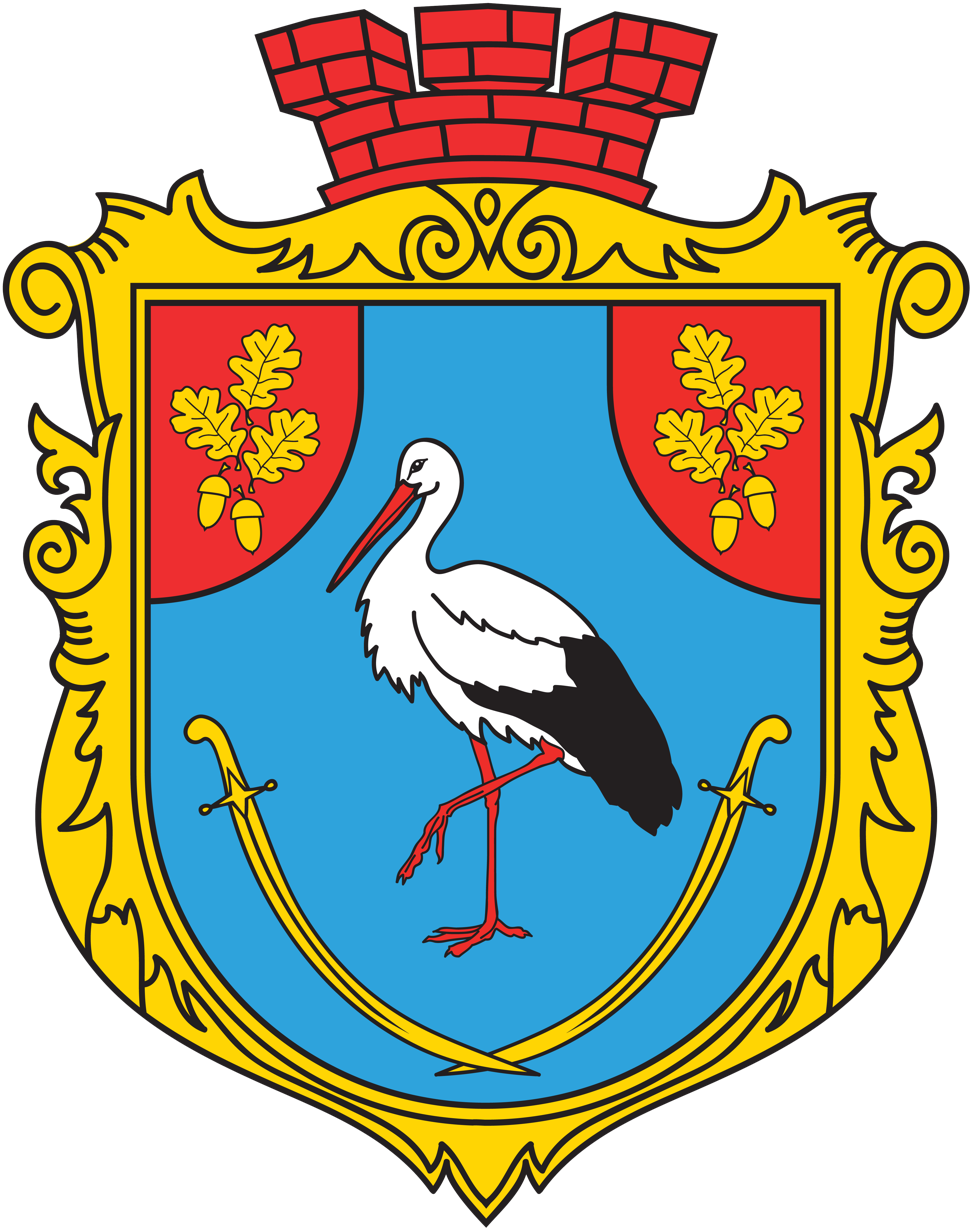
Lykhivka

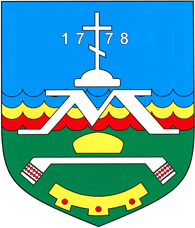
Mahdalynivka

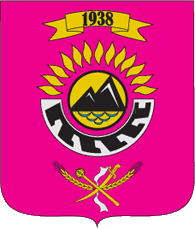
Marhanets

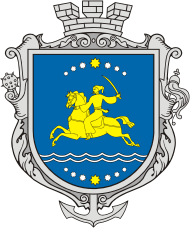
Nikopol

Novomoskovsk

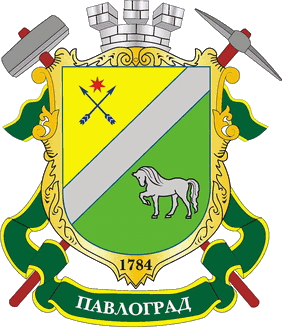
Pavlohrad

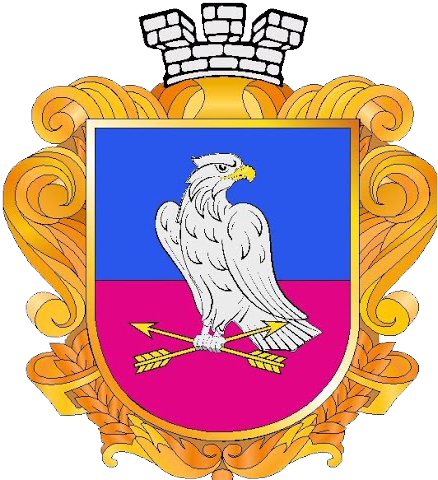
Pereshchepyne

Pershotravensk

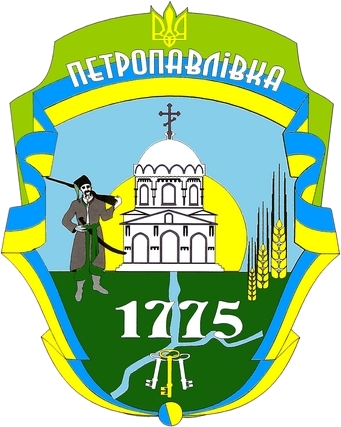
Petropavlivka

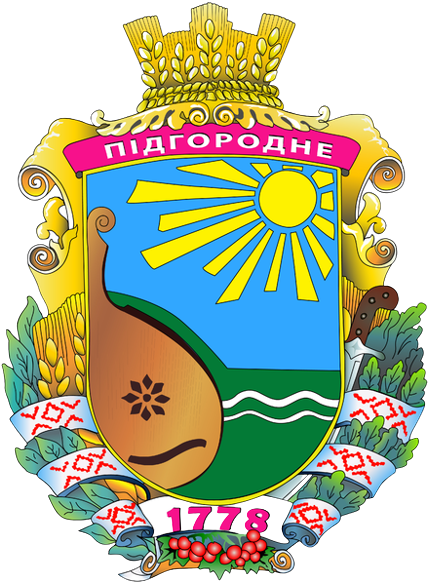
Pidhorodne

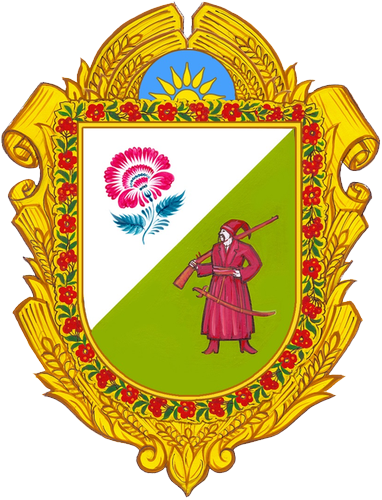
Petrykivka

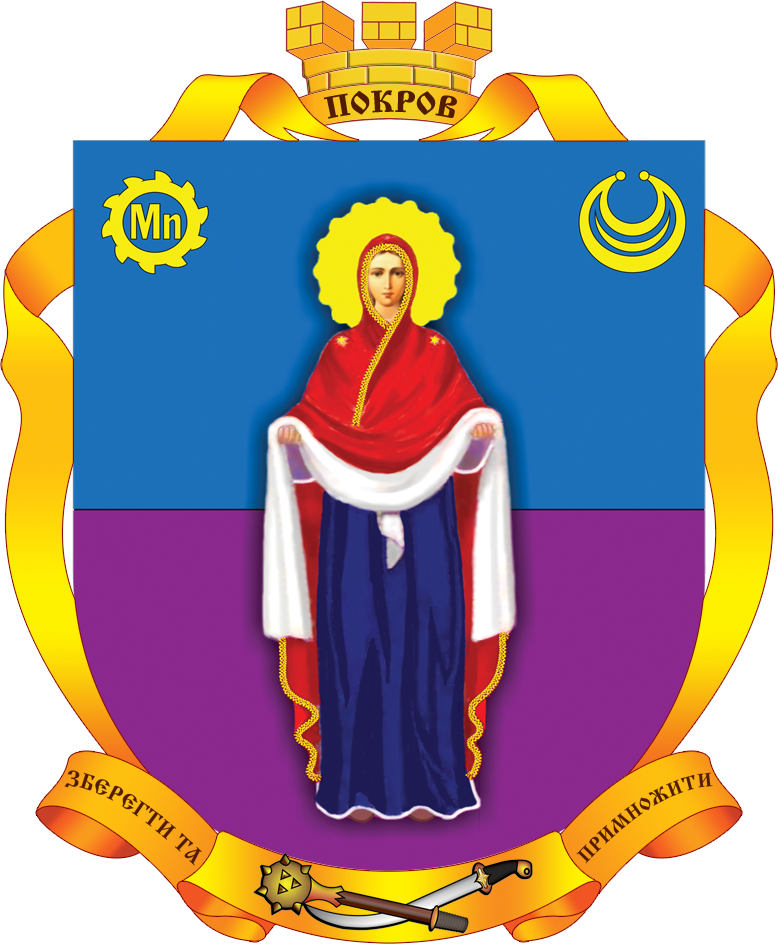
Pokrov

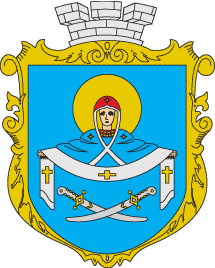
Pokrovske

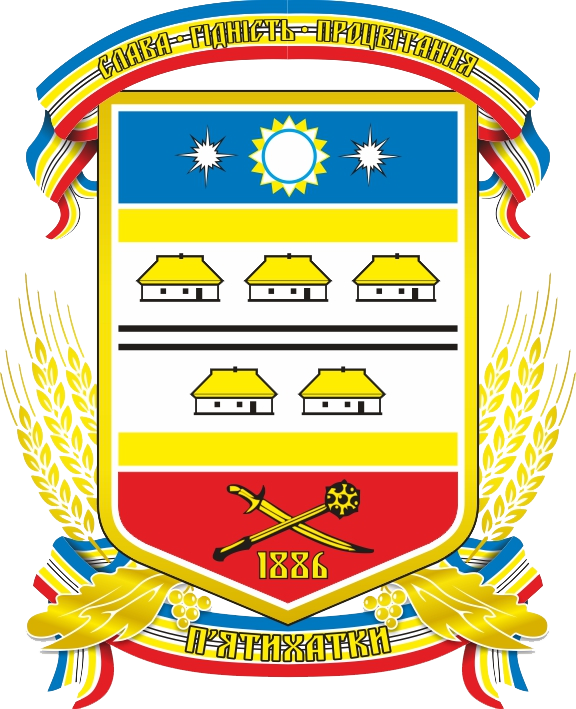
Piatykhatky

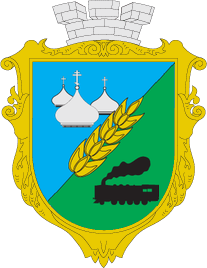
Pysmenne

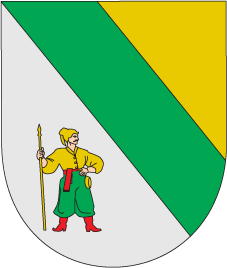
Radushne

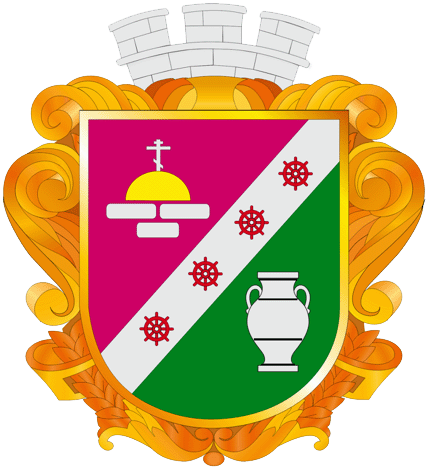
Solone

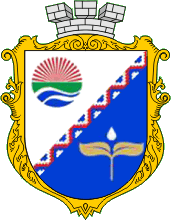
Slobozhanske

Synelnykove

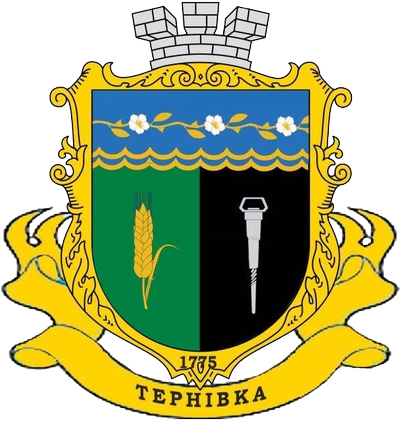
Ternivka

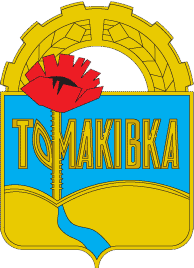
Tomakivka

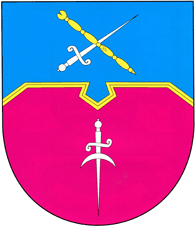
Tsarychanka

Vasylkivka

Verkhivtseve

Verkhnodniprovsk

Vilnohirsk

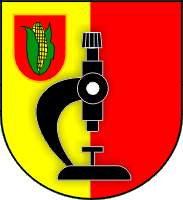
Vyshneve

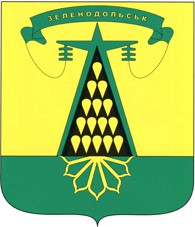
Zelenodolsk

Zhovti Vody

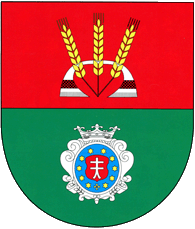
Apostolove Raion

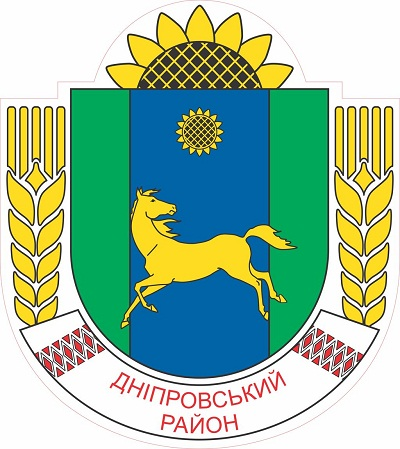
Dnipro Raion

Krynychky Raion

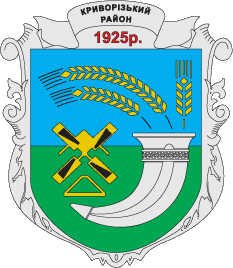
Kryvyi Rih Raion

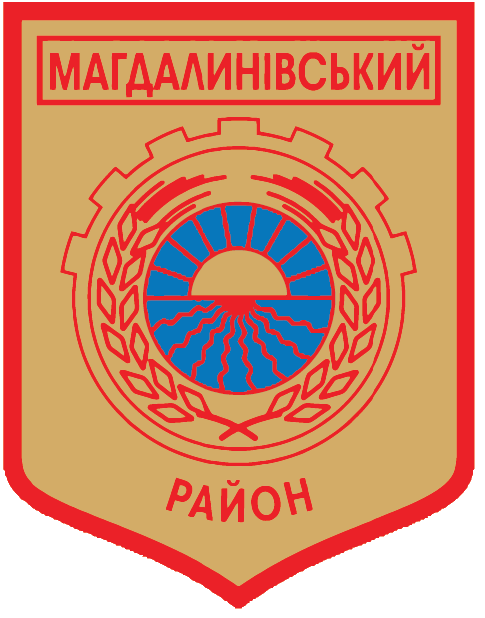
Mahdalynivka Raion

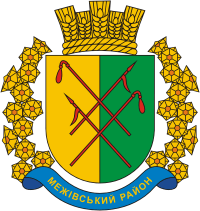
Mezhova Raion

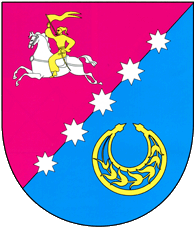
Nikopol Raion

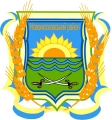
Novomoskovsk Raion

Pavlohrad Raion

Petropavlivka Raion

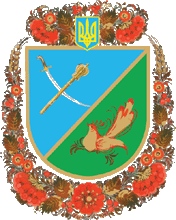
Petrykivka Raion

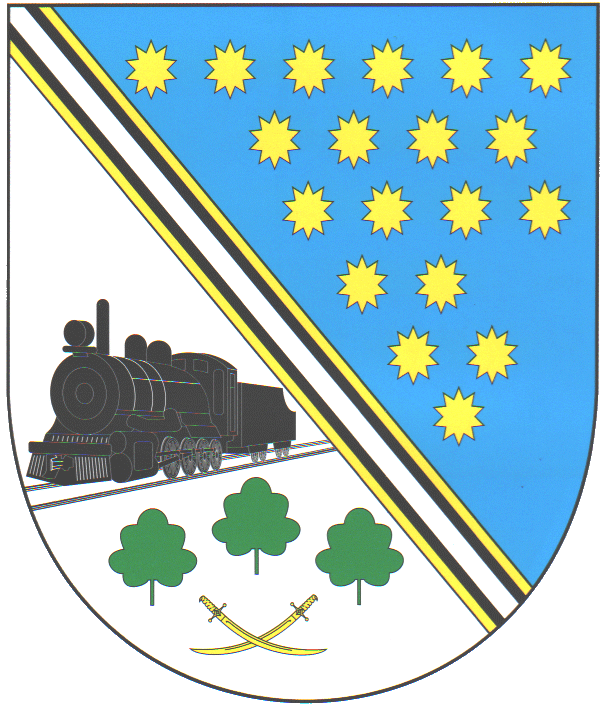
Piatykhatky Raion

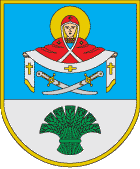
Pokrovske Raion

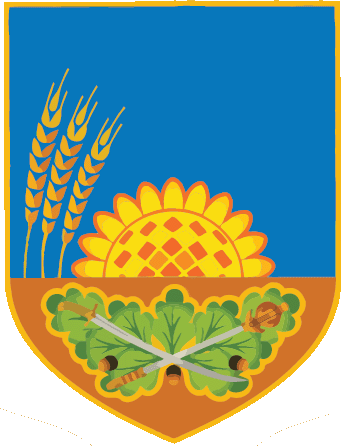
Shyroke Raion

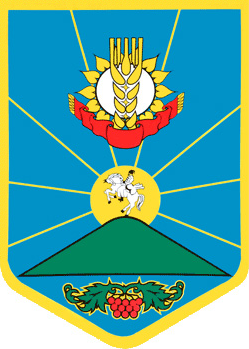
Sofiivka Raion

Solone Raion

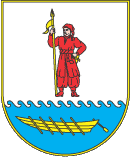
Synelnykove Raion

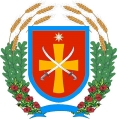
Tomakivka Raion

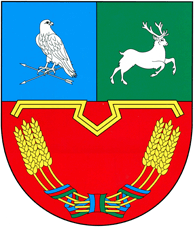
Tsarychanka Raion

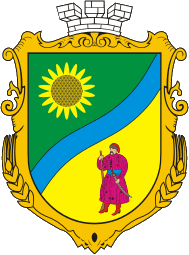
Vasylkivka Raion

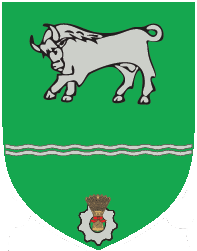
Verkhnodniprovsk Raion

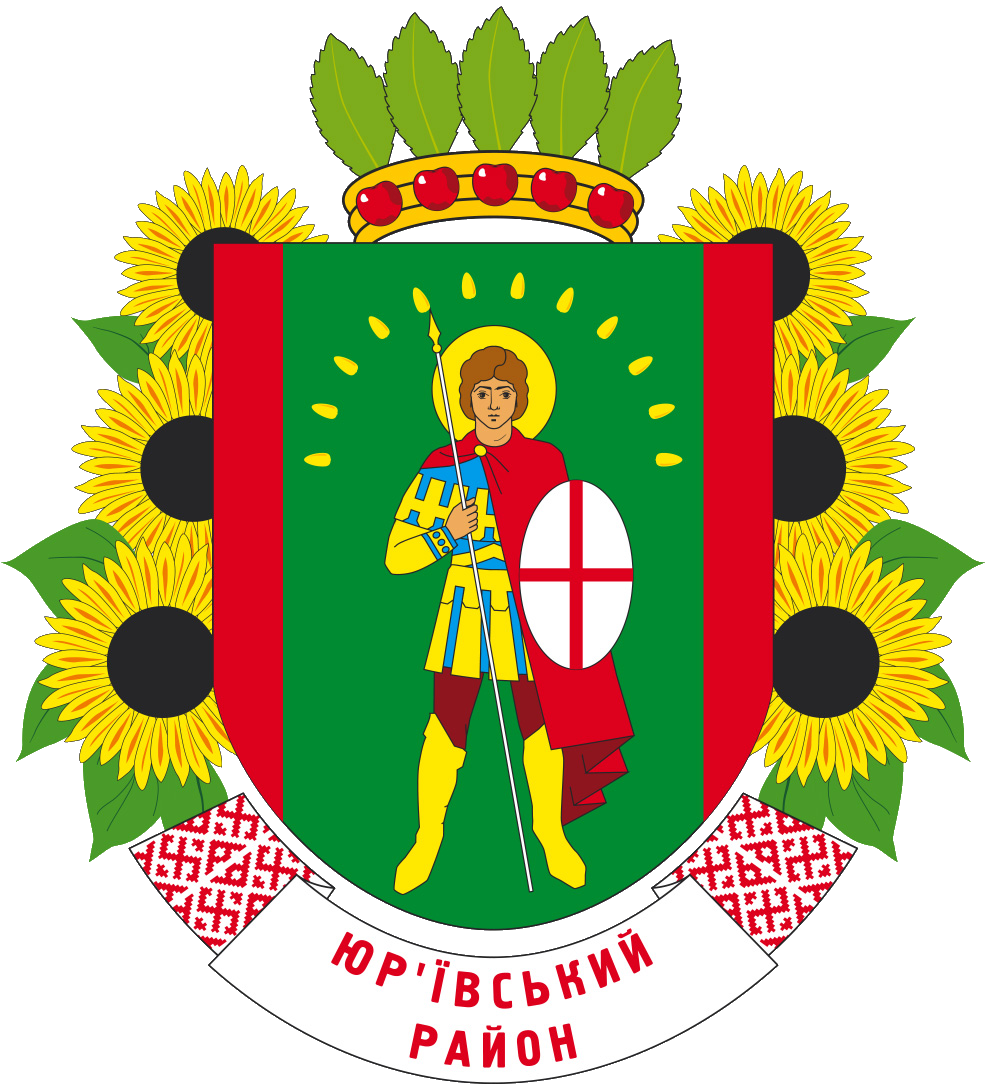
Yurivka Raion

=== Donetsk Oblast ===
Donetsk

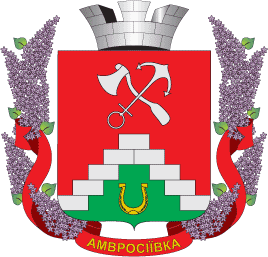
Amvrosiivka

Avdiivka

Bakhmut

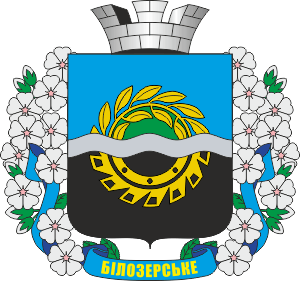
Bilozerske

Bilytske

Chasiv Yar

Debaltseve

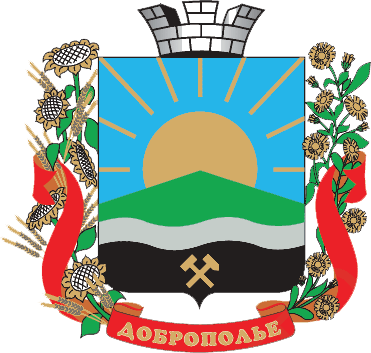
Dobropillia

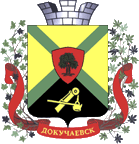
Dokuchaievsk

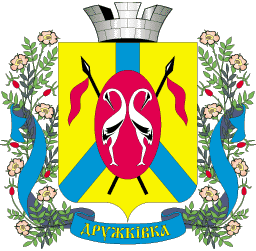
Druzhkivka

Khartsyzk

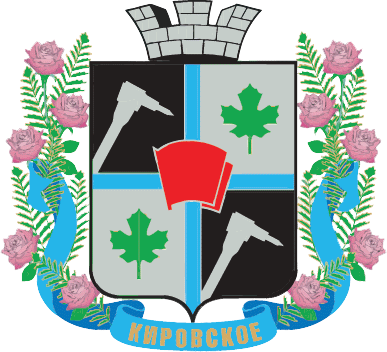
Kirovske

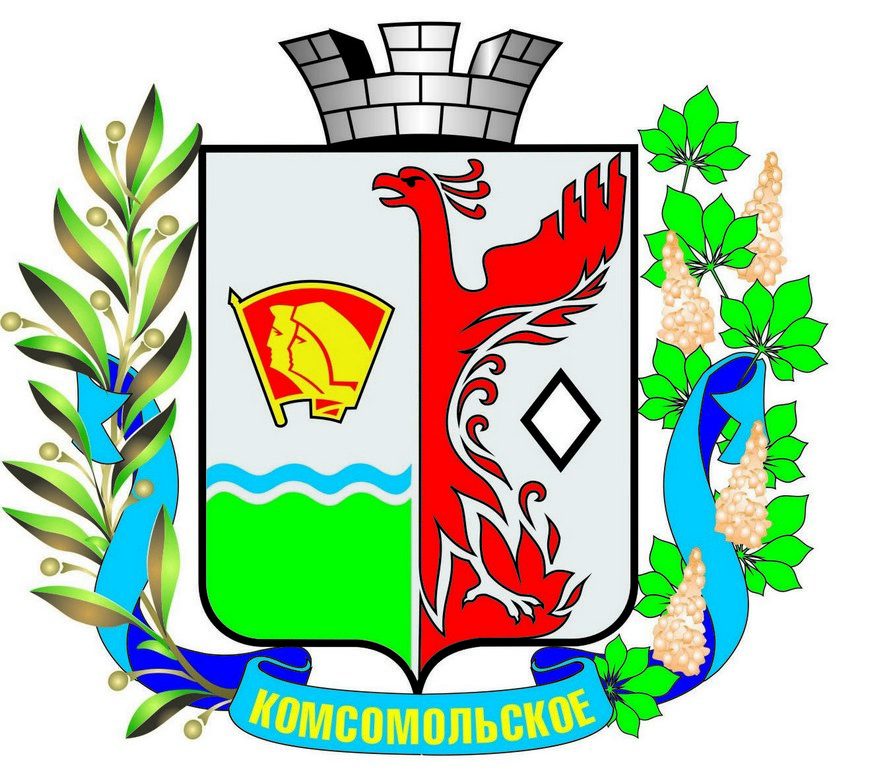
Komsomolske

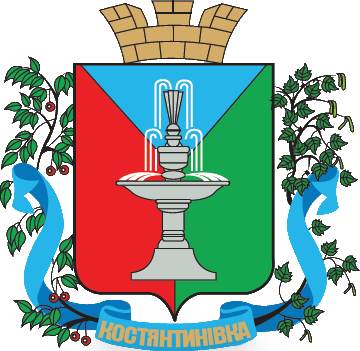
Kostiantynivka

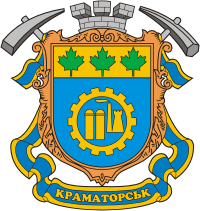
Kramatorsk

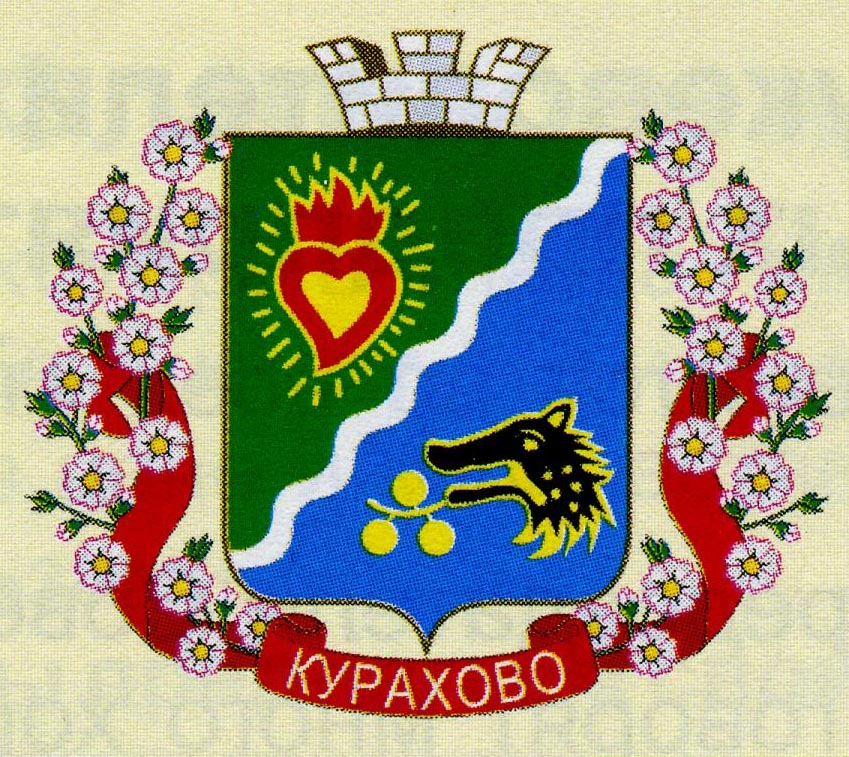
Kurakhove

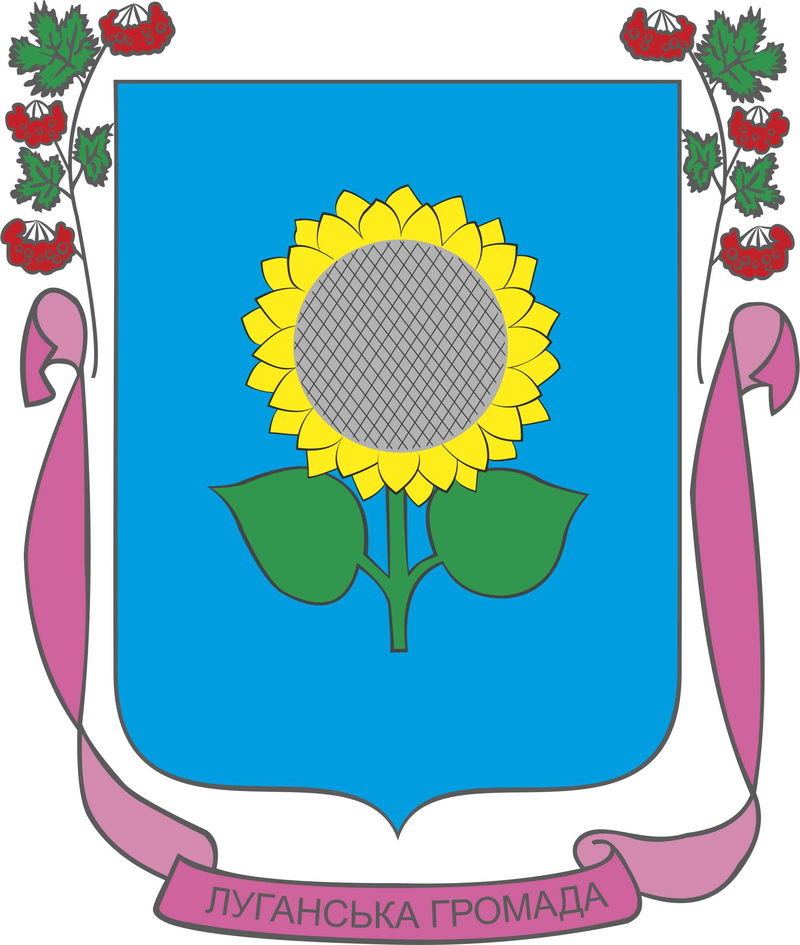
Luhanske

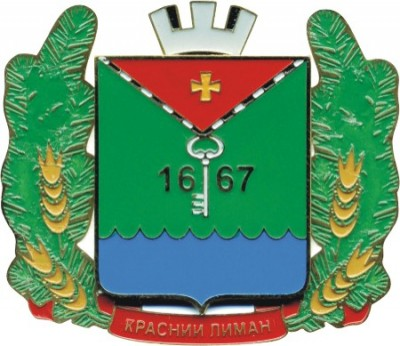
Lyman

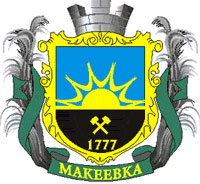
Makiivka

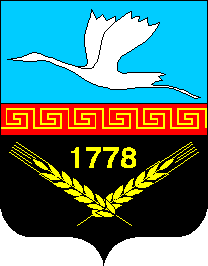
Manhush

Mariupol

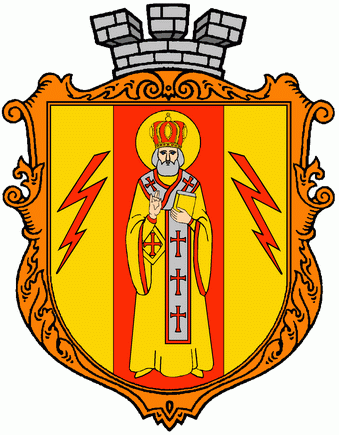
Mykolaivka

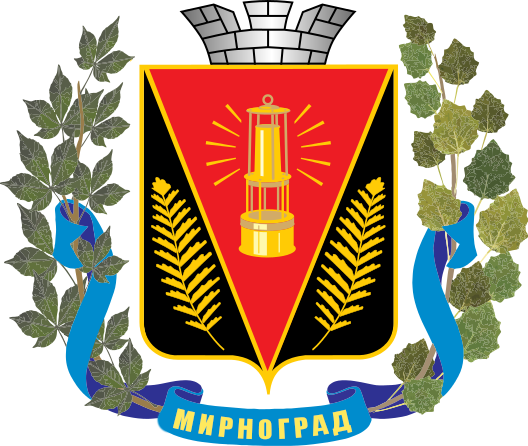
Myrnohrad

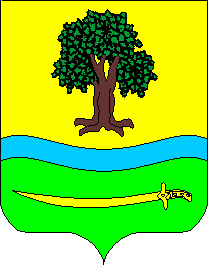
Nikolske

New York

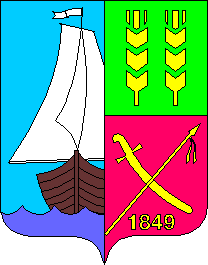
Novoazovsk

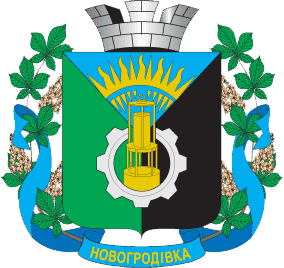
Novohrodivka

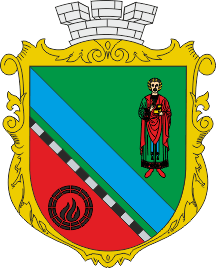
Panteleimonivka

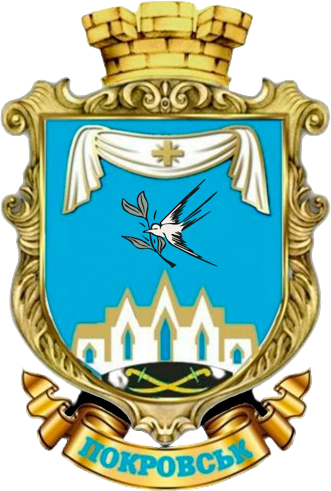
Pokrovsk

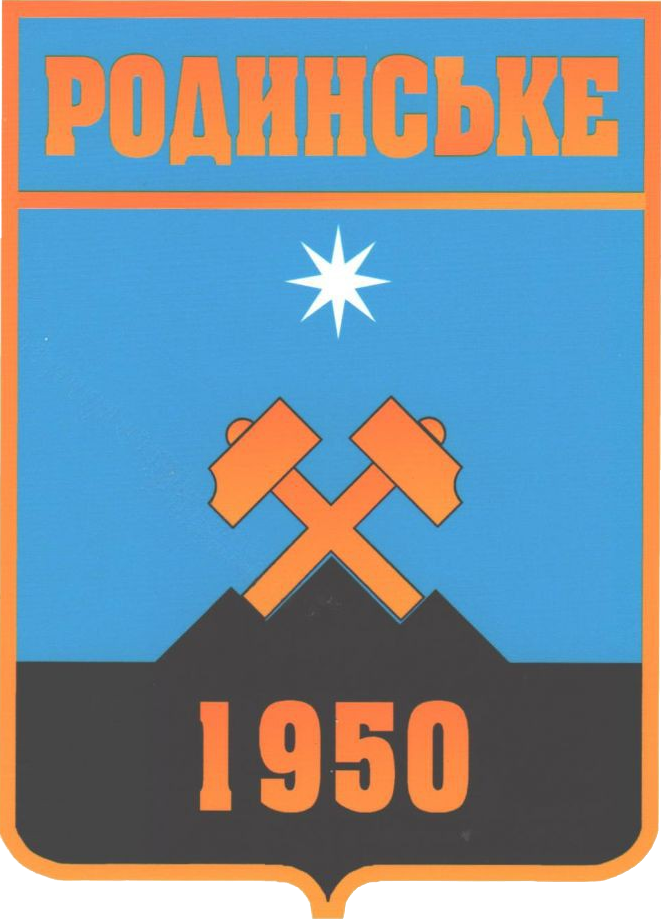
Rodynske

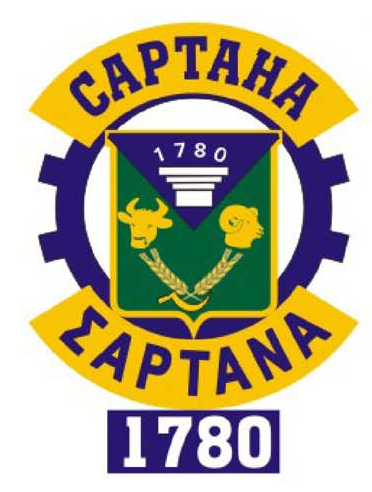
Sartana

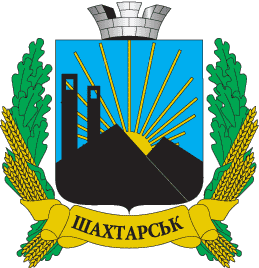
Shakhtarsk

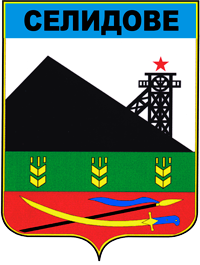
Selydove

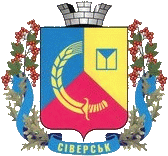
Siversk

Sloviansk

Snizhne

Soledar

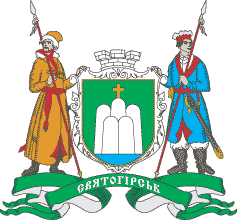
Sviatohirsk

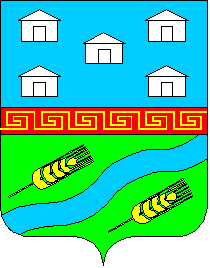
Starobesheve

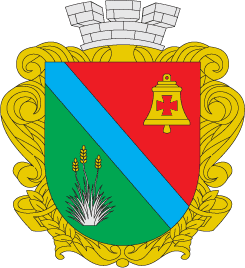
Talakivka

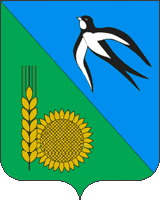
Telmanove

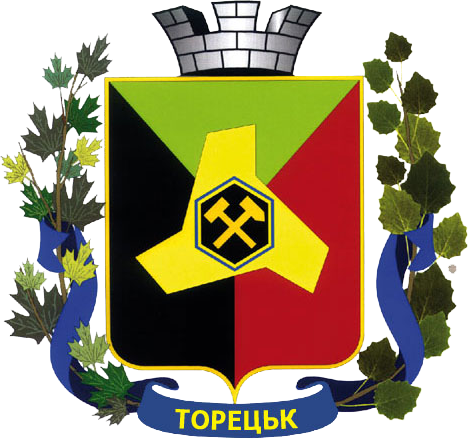
Toretsk

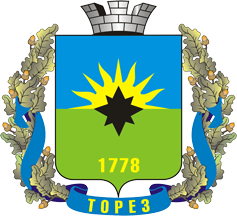
Torez

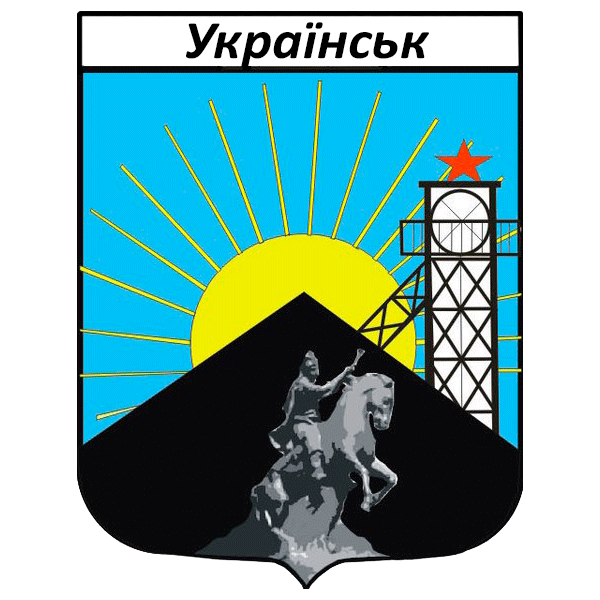
Ukrainsk

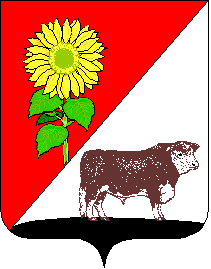
Velyka Novosilka

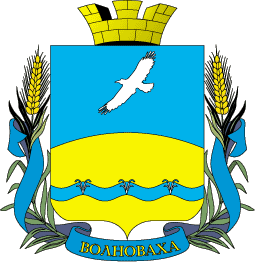
Volnovakha

Vuhledar

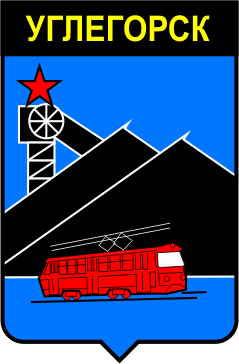
Vuhlehirsk

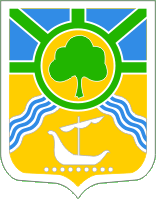
Yasynuvata

Yenakiieve

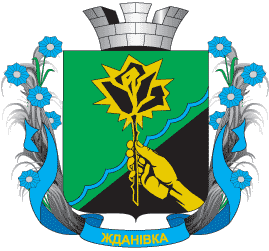
Zhdanivka

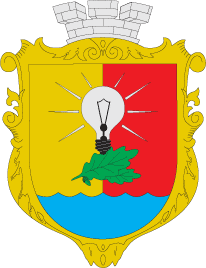
Zuhres

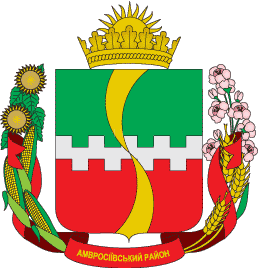
Amvrosiivka Raion

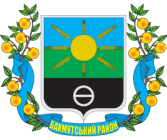
Bakhmut Raion

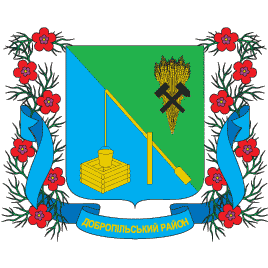
Dobropillia Raion

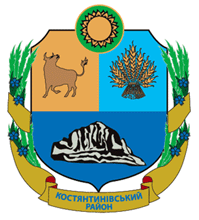
Kostiantynivka Raion

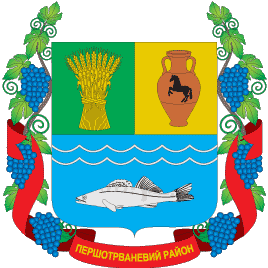
Manhush Raion

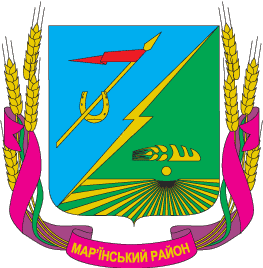
Marinka Raion

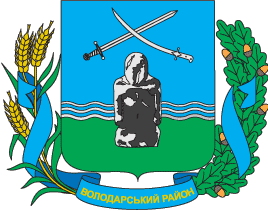
Nikolske Raion

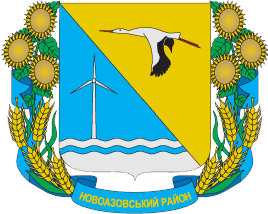
Novoazovsk Raion

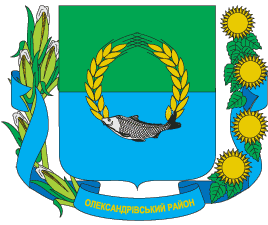
Oleksandrivka Raion

Pokrovsk Raion

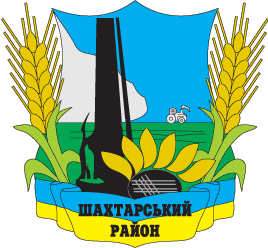
Shakhtarsk Raion

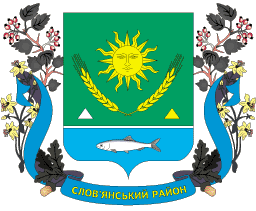
Sloviansk Raion

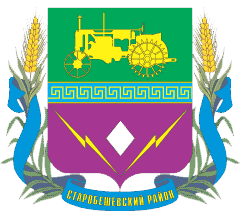
Starobesheve Raion

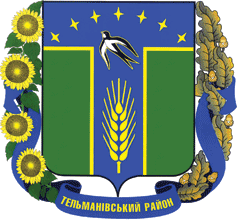
Telmanove Raion

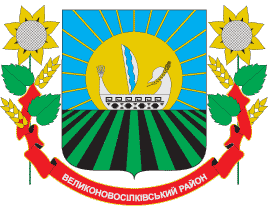
Velyka Novosilka Raion

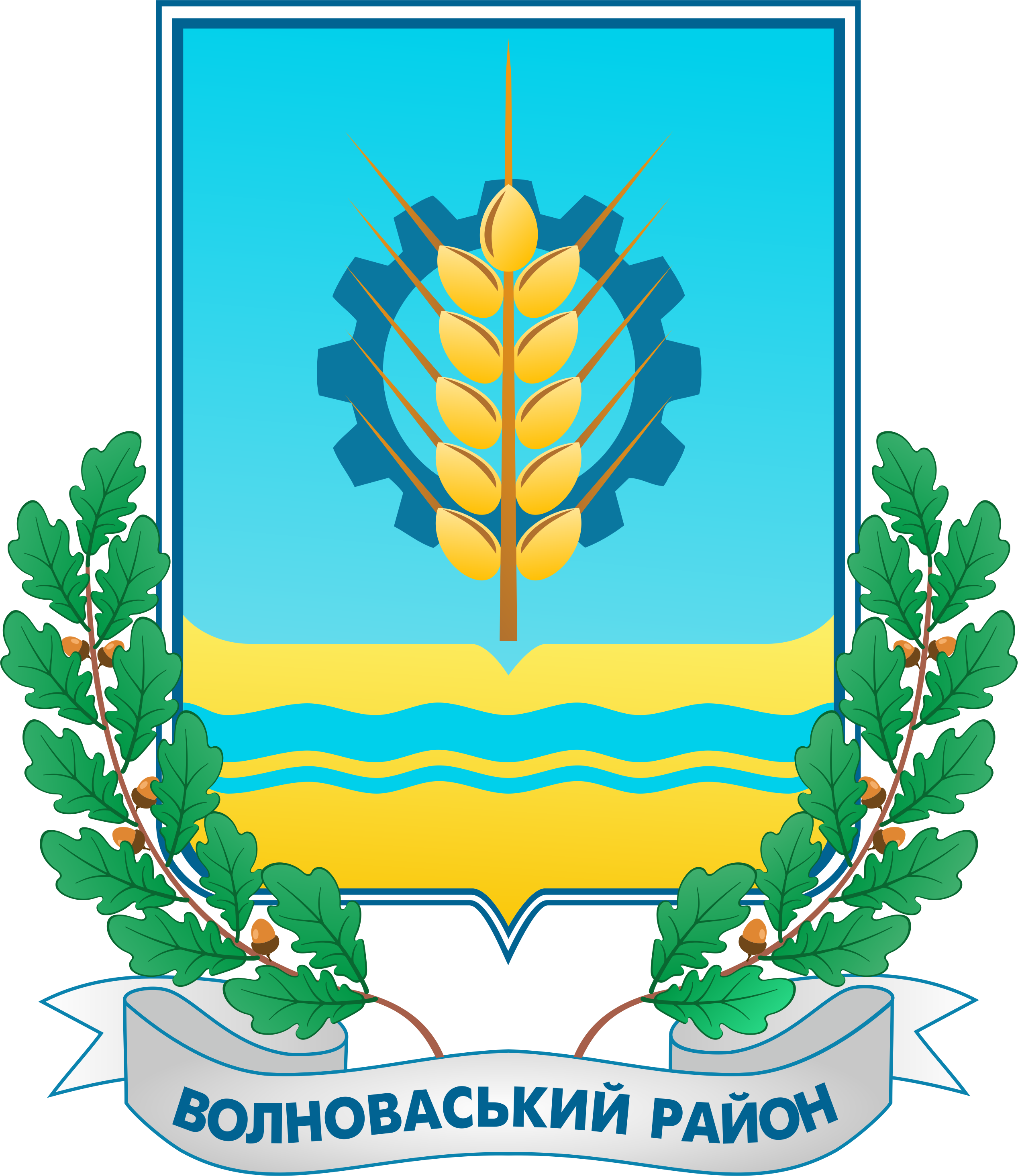
Volnovakha Raion

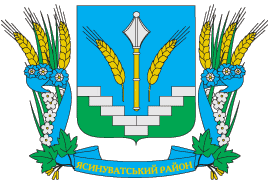
Yasynuvata Raion

=== Ivano-Frankivsk Oblast ===
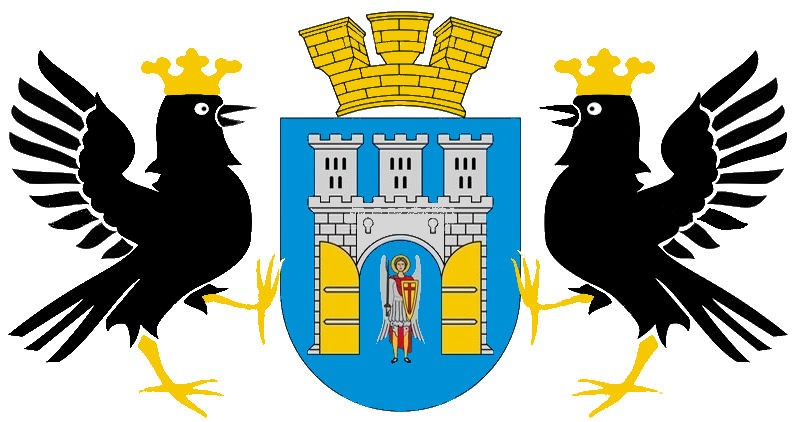
Ivano-Frankivsk

Bilshivtsi

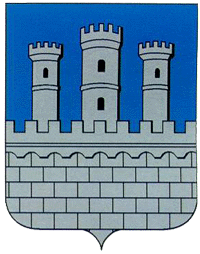
Bohorodchany

Bolekhiv

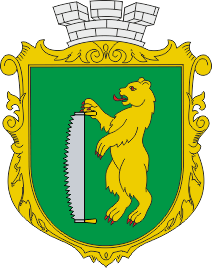
Broshniv-Osada

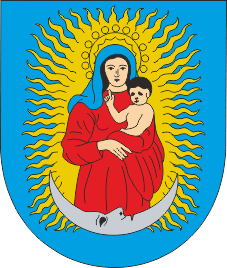
Bukachivtsi

Burshtyn

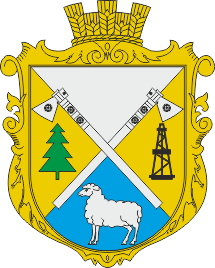
Bytkiv

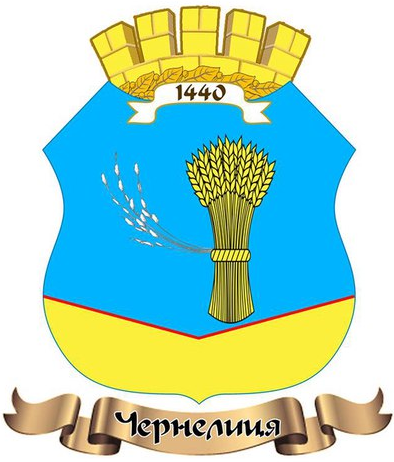
Chernelytsia

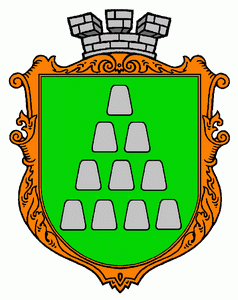
Deliatyn

Dolyna

Halych

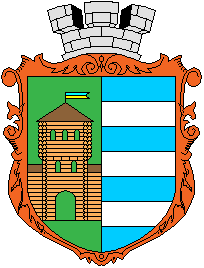
Horodenka

Hvizdets

Kalush

Kolomyia

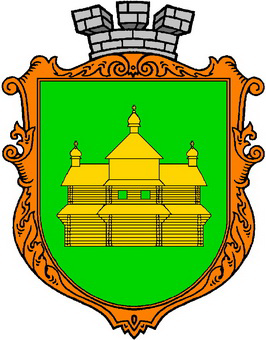
Kosiv

Kuty

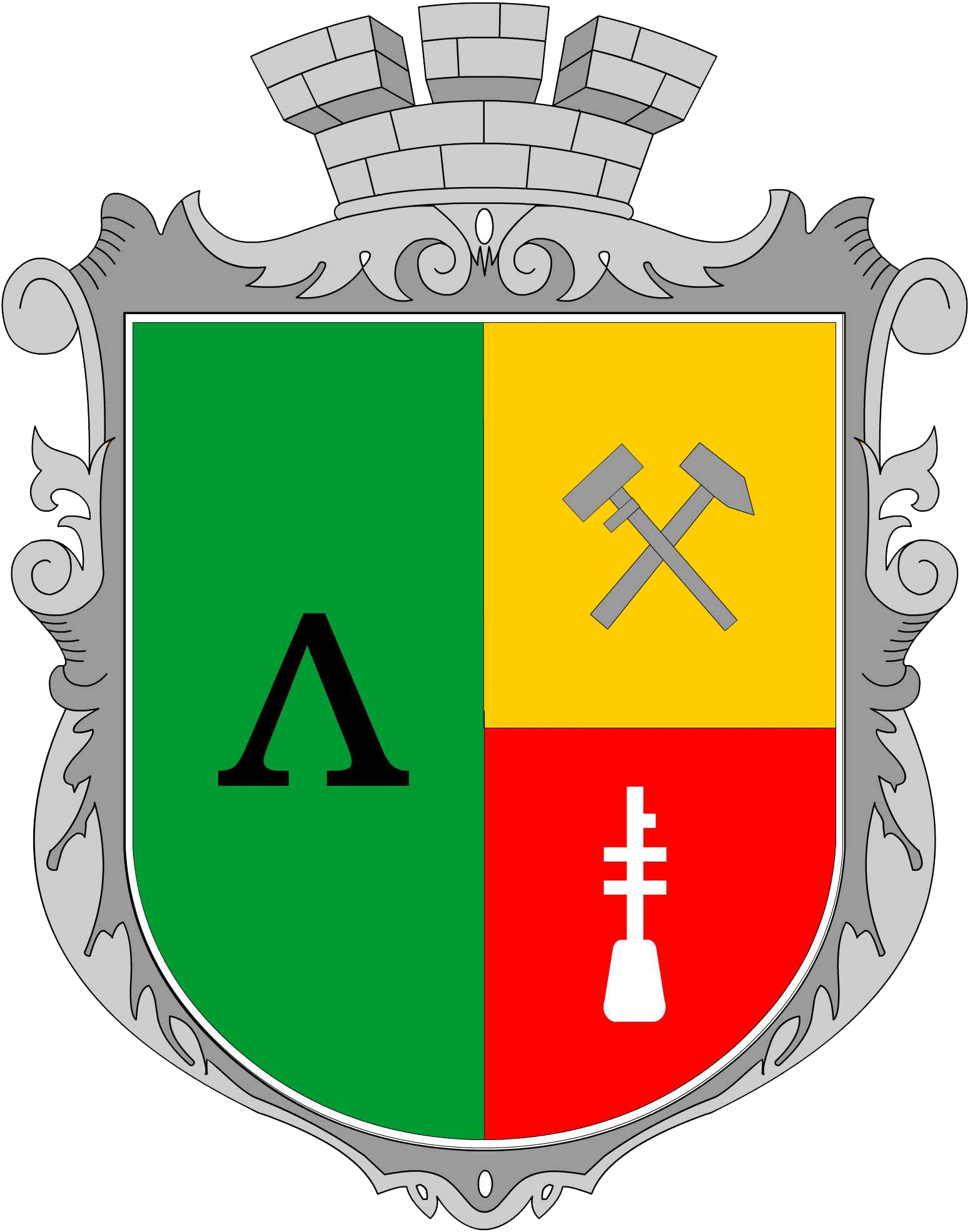
Lanchyn

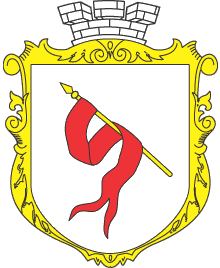
Nadvirna

Pechenizhyn

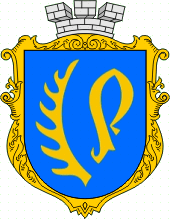
Rohatyn

Rozhniativ

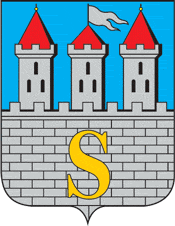
Sniatyn

Solotvyn

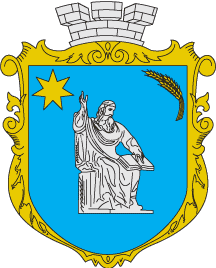
Tlumach

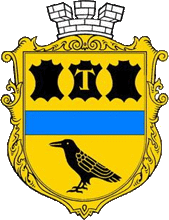
Tysmenytsia

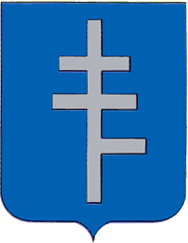
Yabluniv

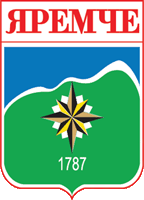
Yaremche

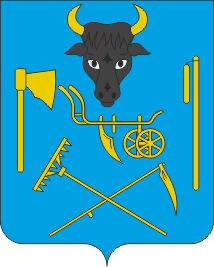
Yezupil

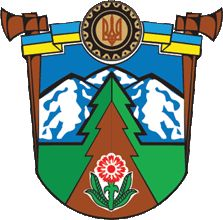
Verkhovyna

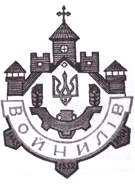
Voinyliv

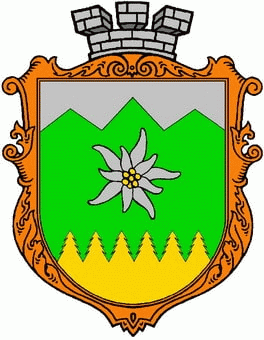
Vorokhta

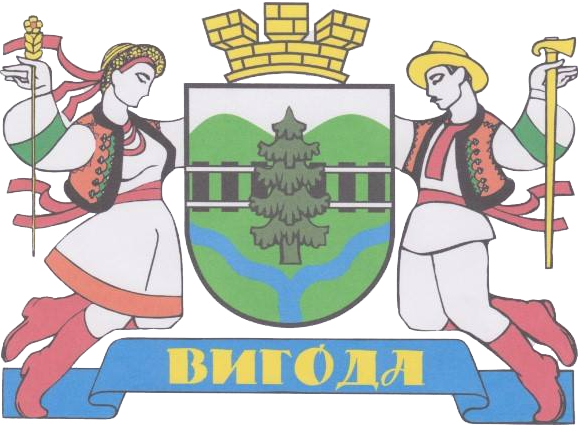
Vyhoda

Zabolotiv

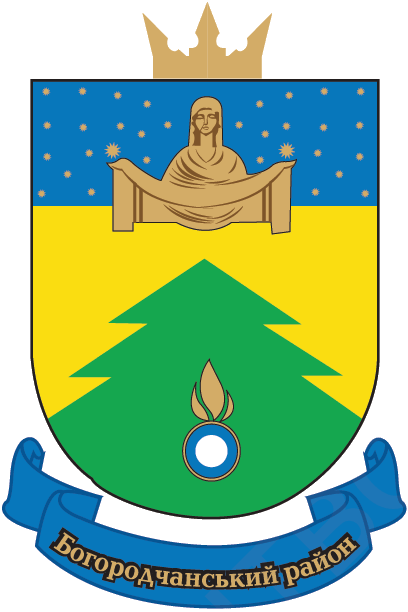
Bohorodchany Raion

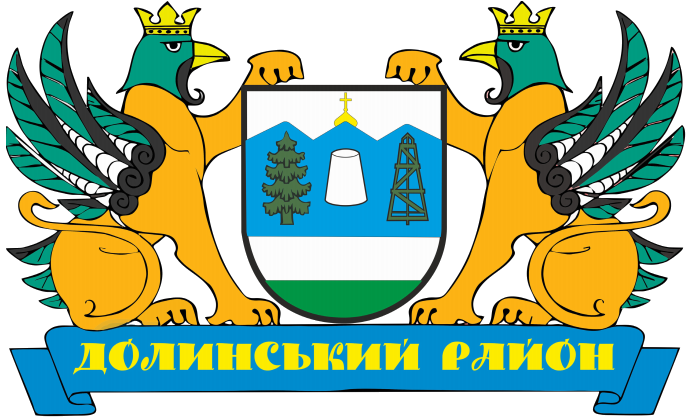
Dolyna Raion

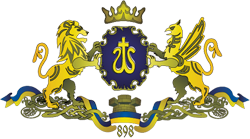
Halych Raion

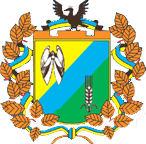
Horodenka Raion

Kalush Raion

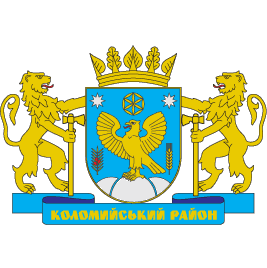
Kolomyia Raion

Kosiv Raion

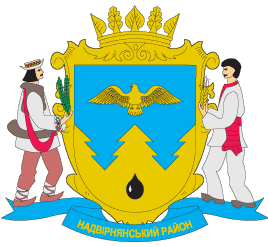
Nadvirna Raion

Rohatyn Raion

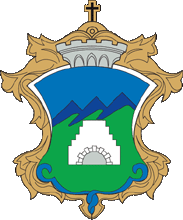
Rozhniativ Raion

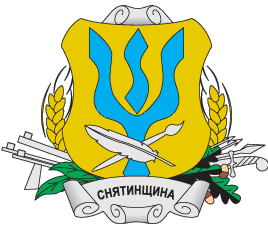
Sniatyn Raion

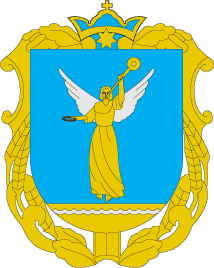
Tlumach Raion

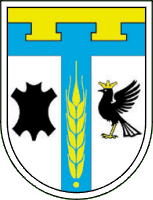
Tysmenytsia Raion

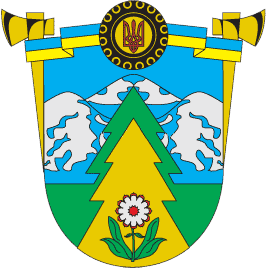
Verkhovyna Raion

=== Kharkiv Oblast ===
Kharkiv

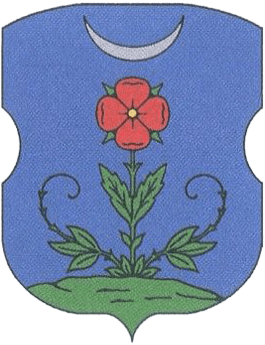
Andriivka

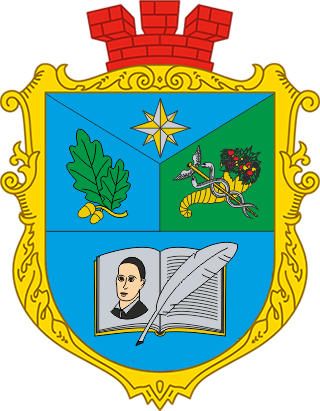
Babai

Balakliia

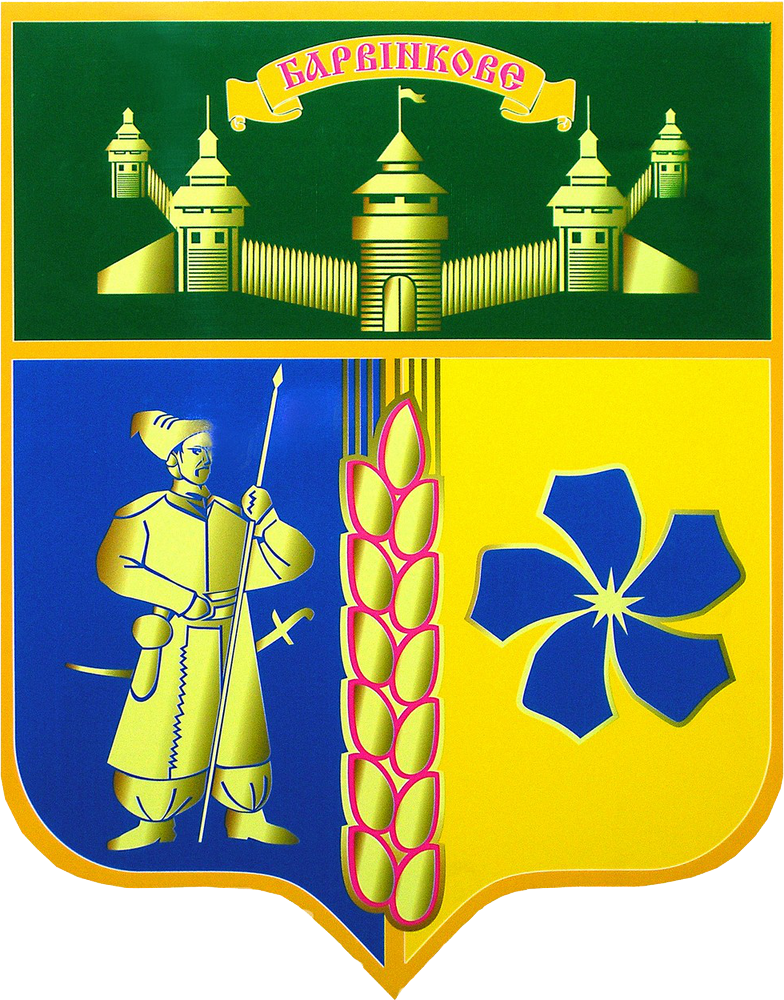
Barvinkove

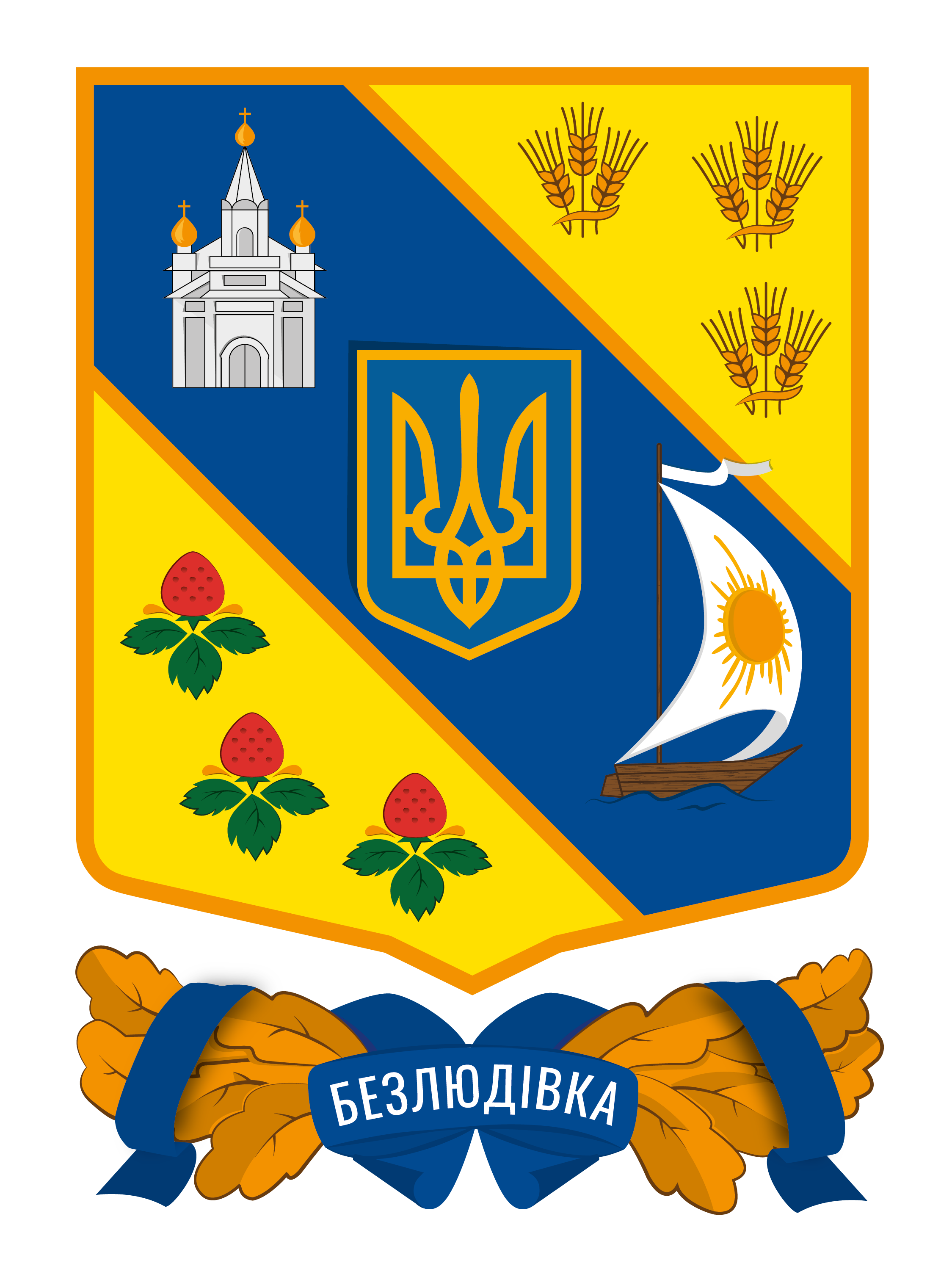
Bezliudivka

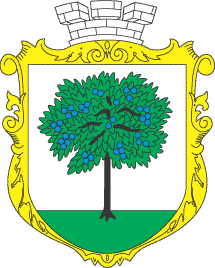
Bohodukhiv

Chuhuiv

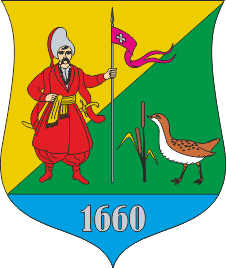
Derhachi

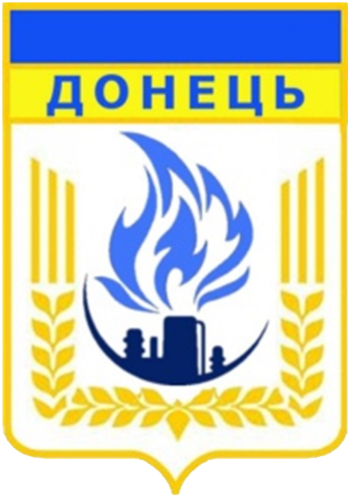
Donets

Dvorichna

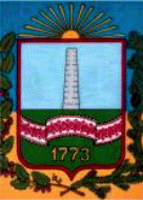
Huty

Izium

Kehychivka

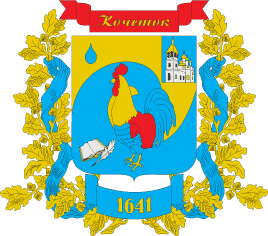
Kochetok

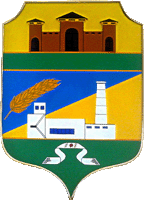
Kolomak

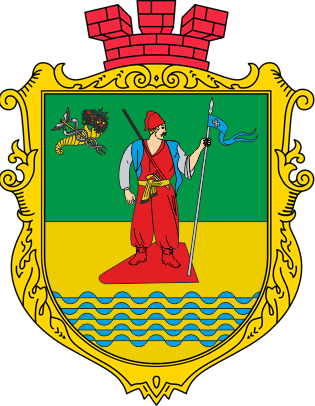
Kozacha Lopan

Berestyn

Krasnokutsk

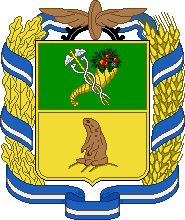
Kupiansk

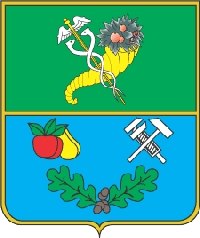
Liubotyn

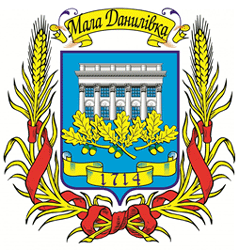
Mala Danylivka

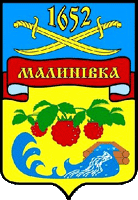
Malynivka

Merefa

Nova Vodolaha

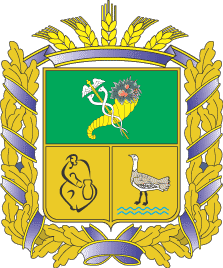
Pechenihy

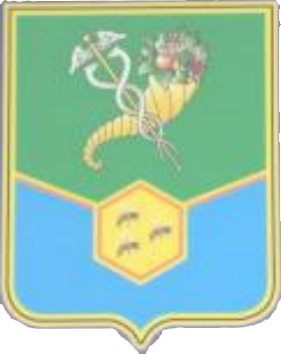
Peresichne

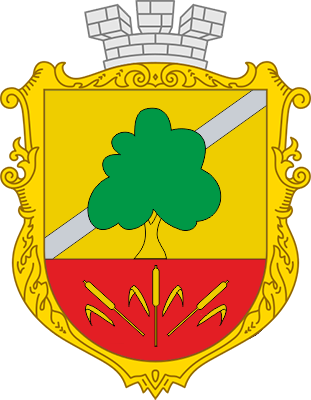
Pivdenne

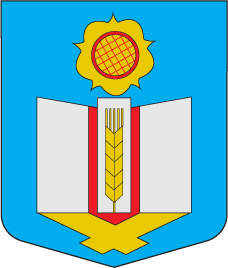
Sakhnovshchyna

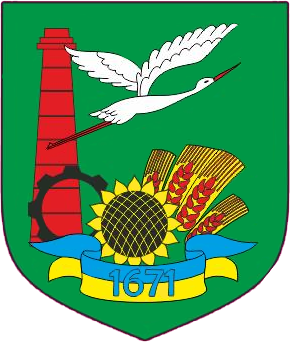
Savyntsi

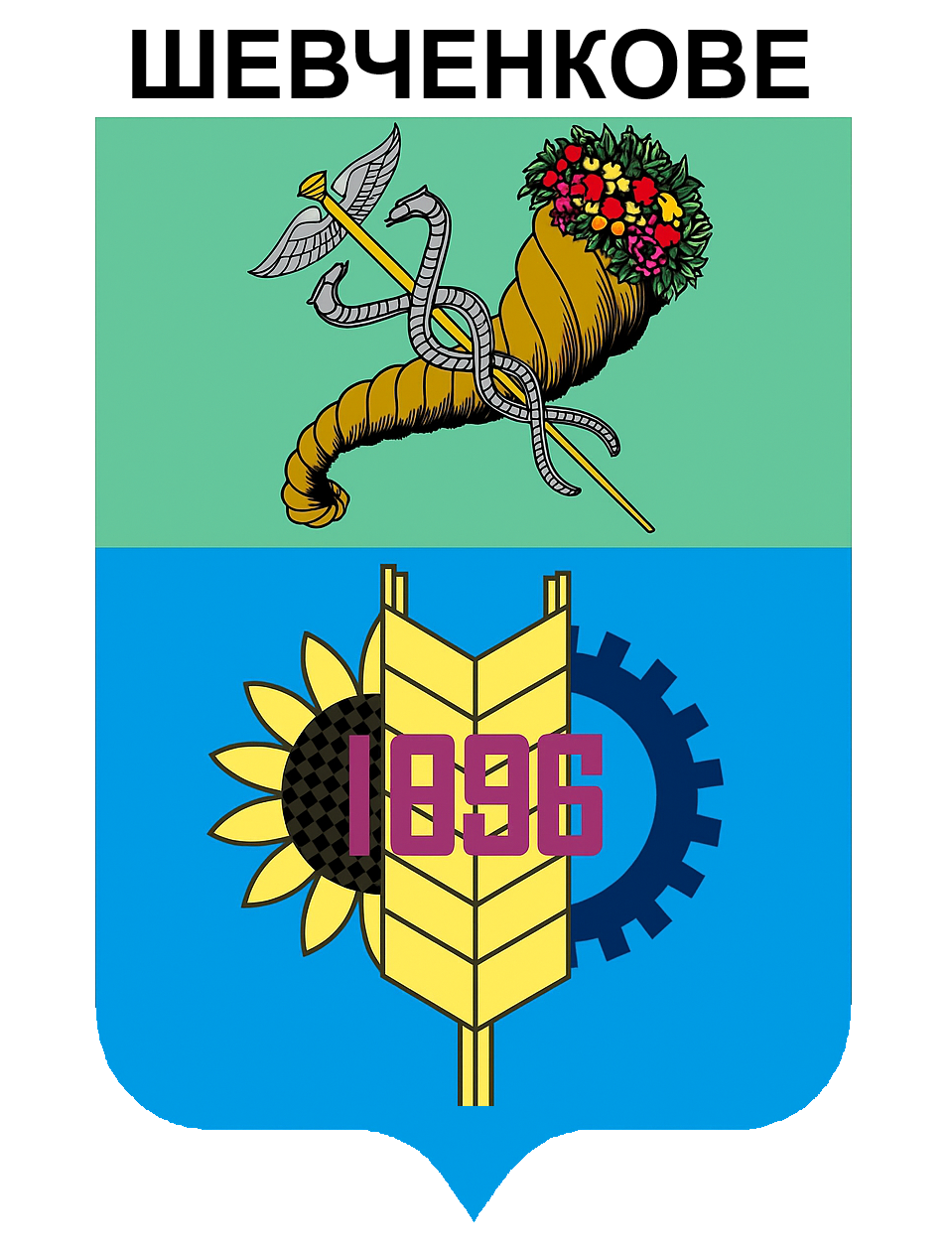
Shevchenkove

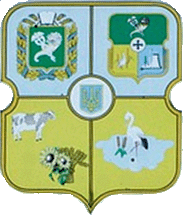
Slatyne

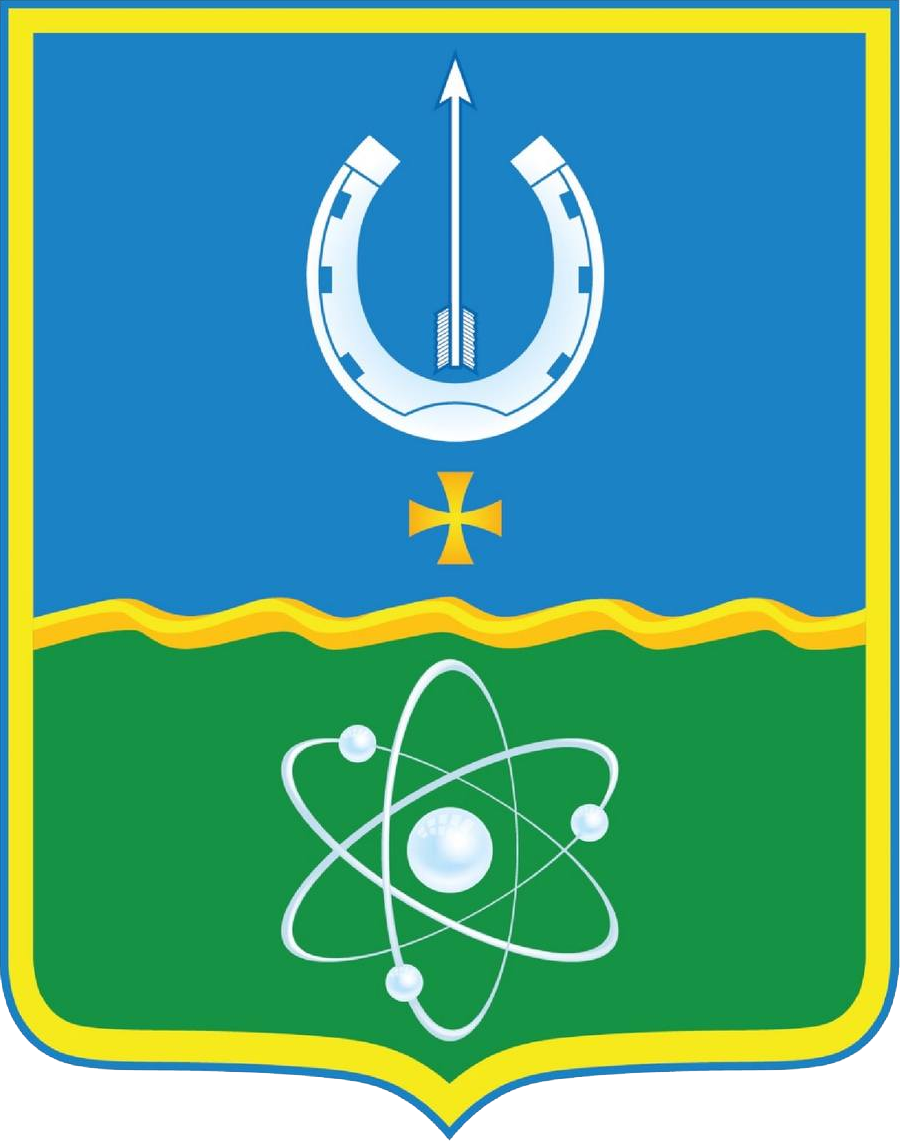
Solonytsivka

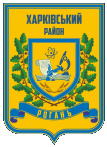
Rohan

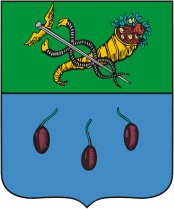
Valky

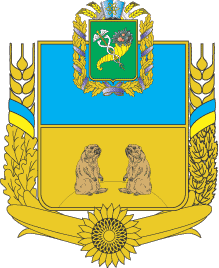
Velykyi Burluk

Vovchansk

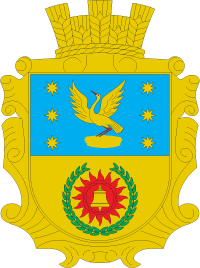
Vilcha

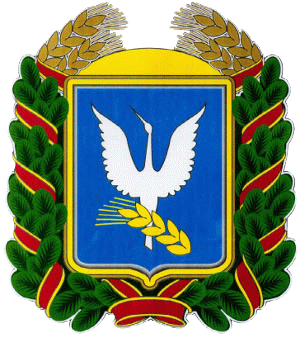
Zachepylivka

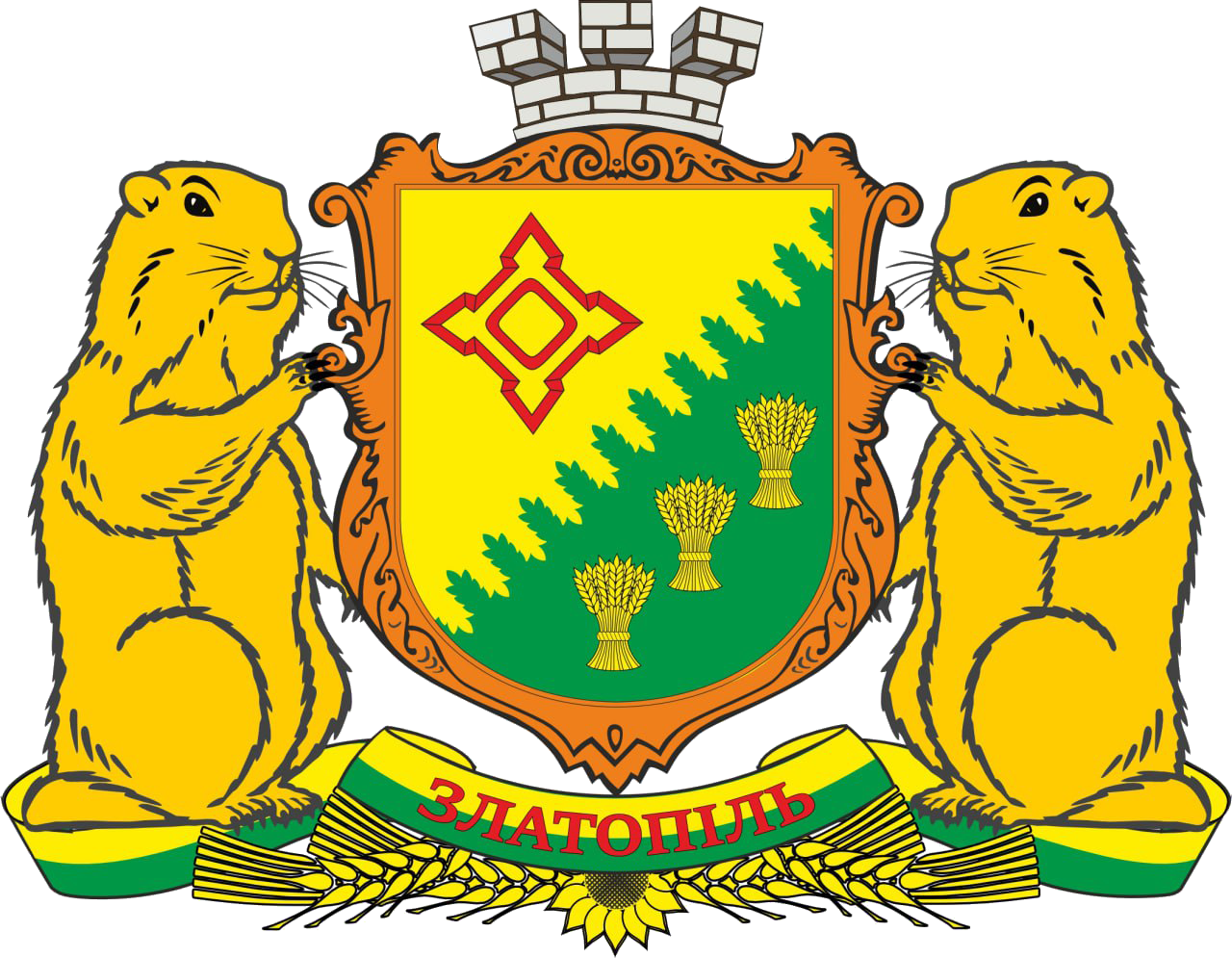
Zlatopil

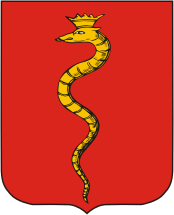
Zmiiv

Zolochiv

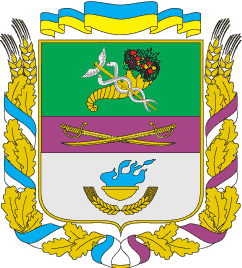
Balakliia Raion

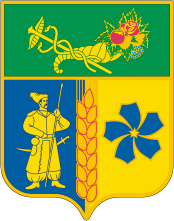
Barvinkove Raion

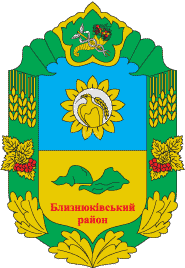
Blyzniuky Raion

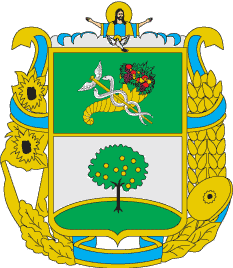
Bohodukhiv Raion

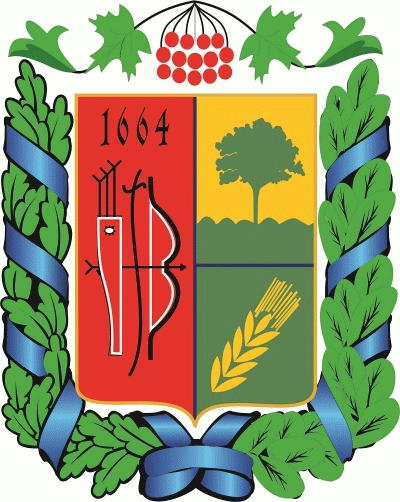
Borova Raion

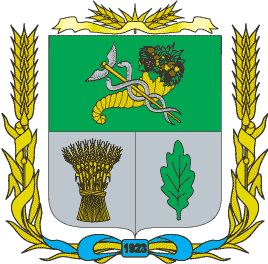
Chuhuiv Raion

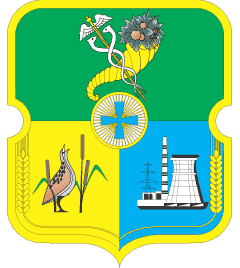
Derhachi Raion

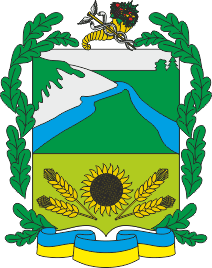
Dvorichna Raion

Izium Raion

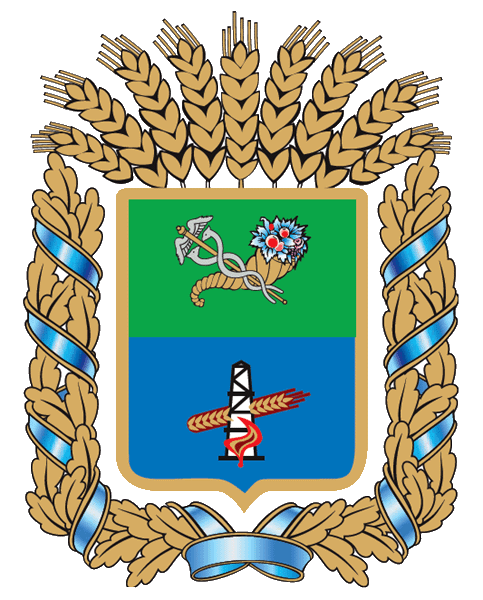
Kehychivka Raion

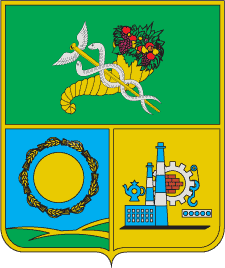
Kharkiv Raion

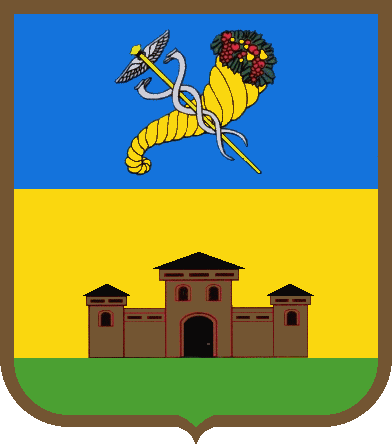
Kolomak Raion

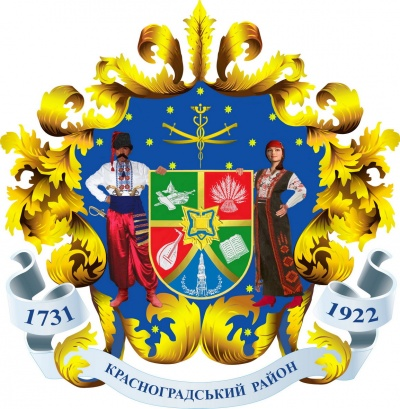
Krasnohrad Raion

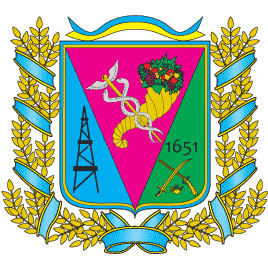
Krasnokutsk Raion

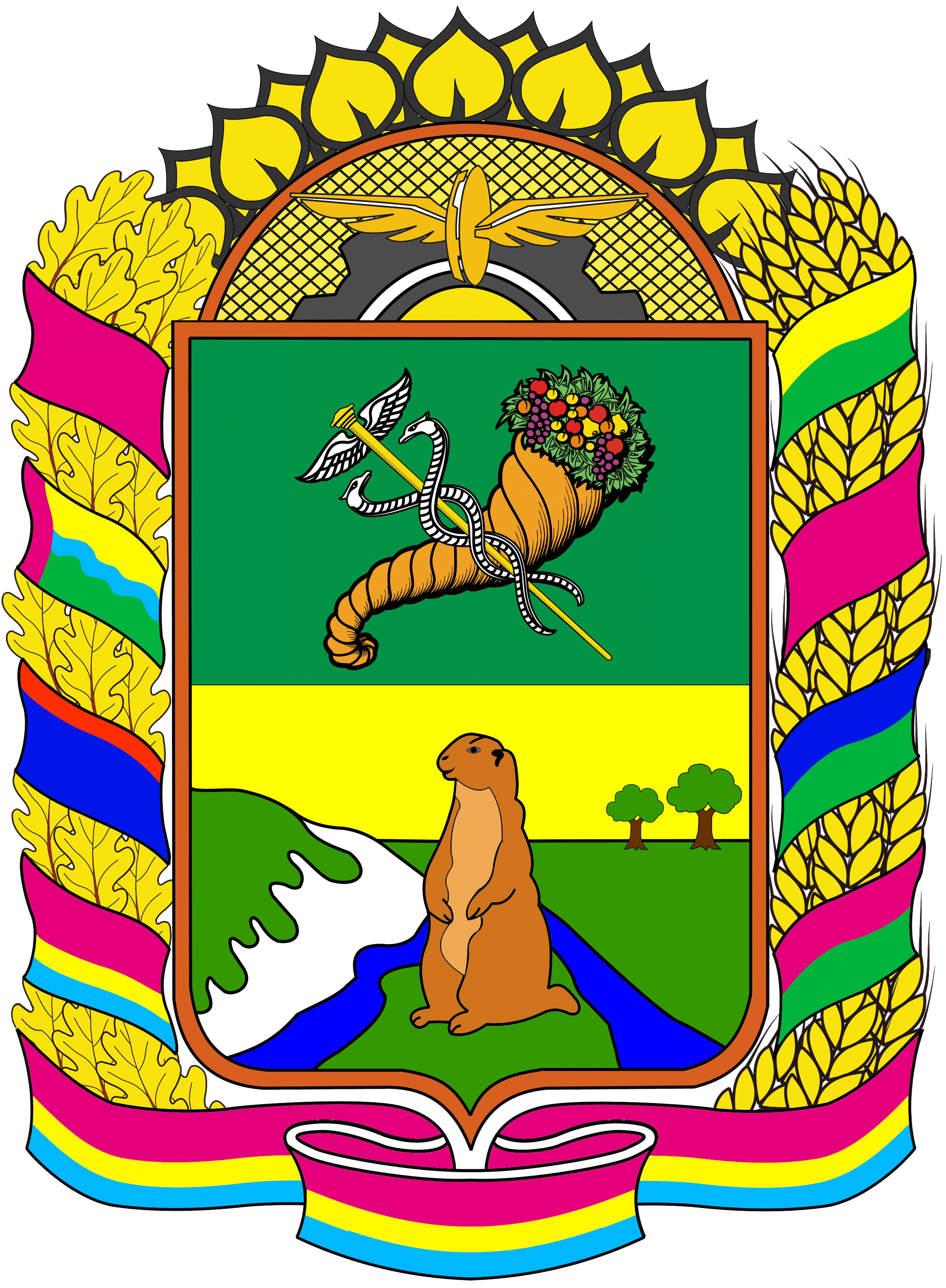
Kupiansk Raion

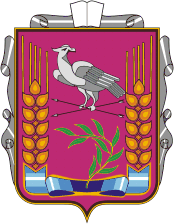
Lozova Raion

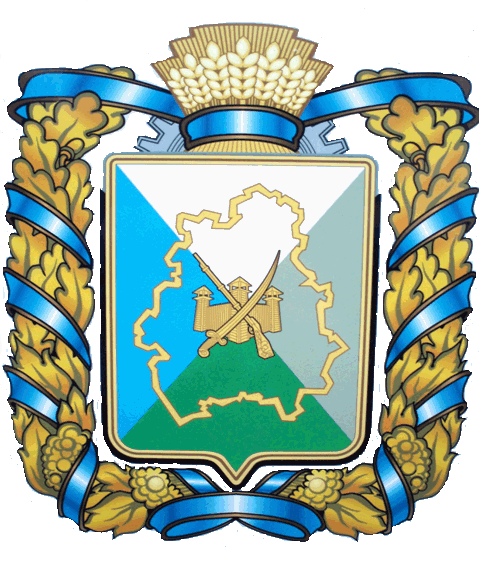
Nova Vodolaha Raion

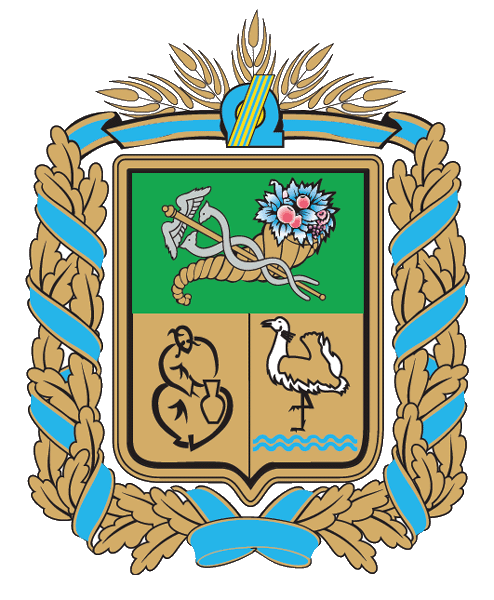
Pechenihy Raion

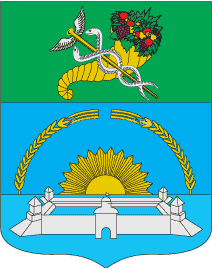
Pervomaiskyi Raion

Sakhnovshchyna Raion

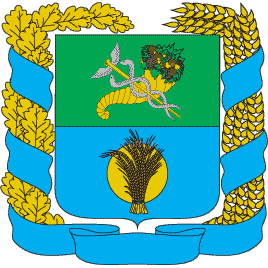
Shevchenkove Raion

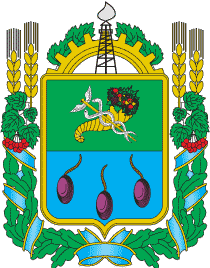
Valky Raion

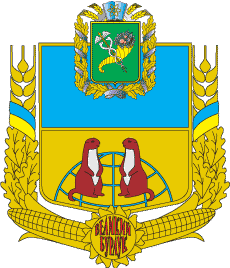
Velykyi Burluk Raion

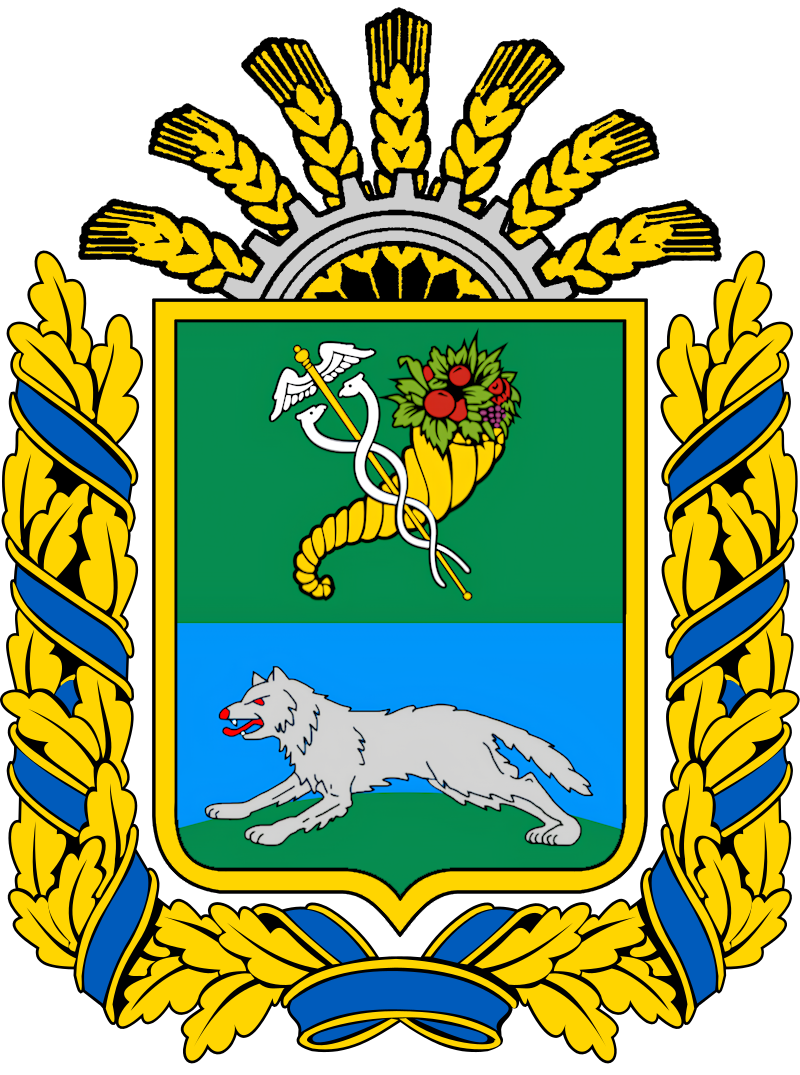
Vovchansk Raion

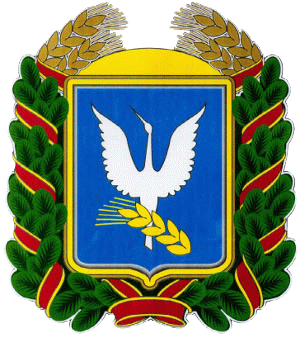
Zachepylivka Raion

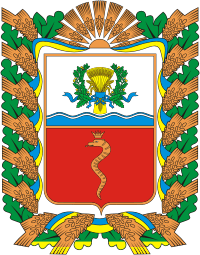
Zmiiv Raion

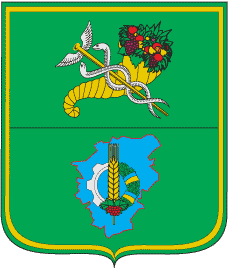
Zolochiv Raion

=== Kherson Oblast ===
Kherson

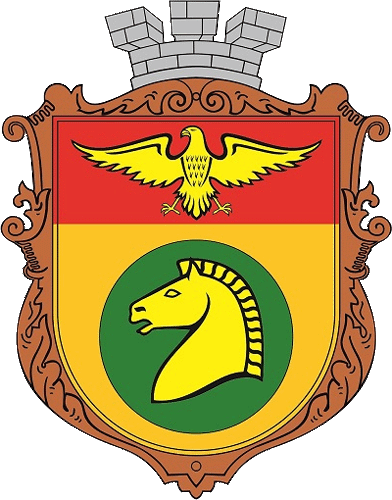
Askania-Nova

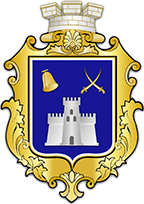
Beryslav

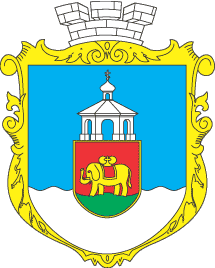
Bilozerka

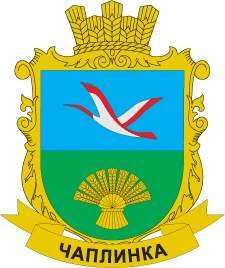
Chaplynka

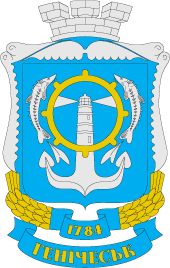
Henichesk

Hola Prystan

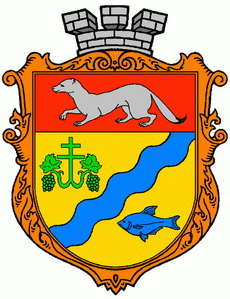
Hornostaivka

Kakhovka

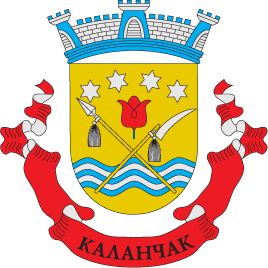
Kalanchak

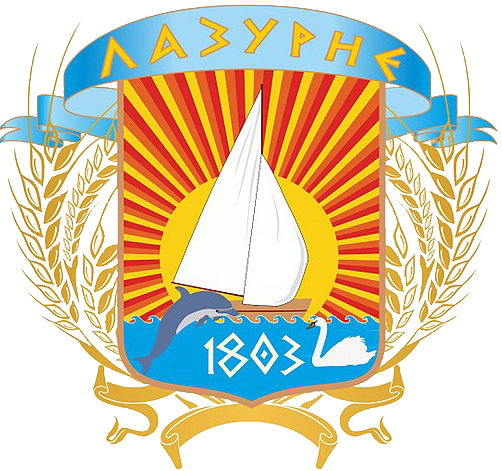
Lazurne

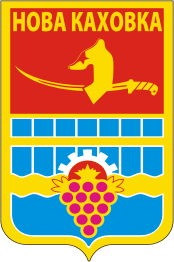
Nova Kakhovka

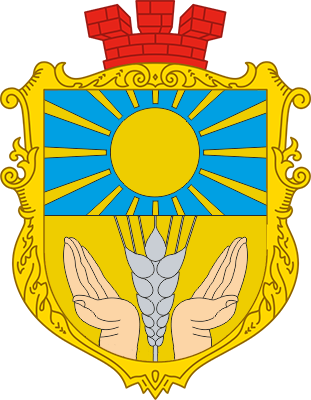
Novotroitske

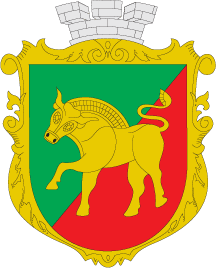
Nyzhni Sirohozy

Oleshky

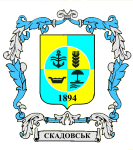
Skadovsk

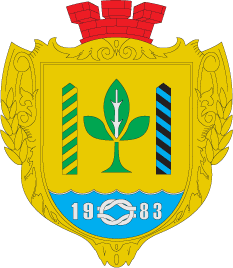
Tavriisk

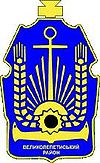
Velyka Lepetykha

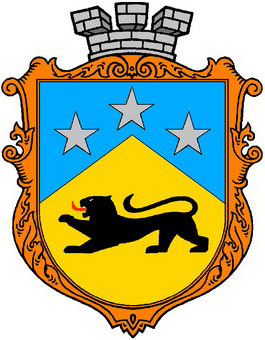
Vysokopillia

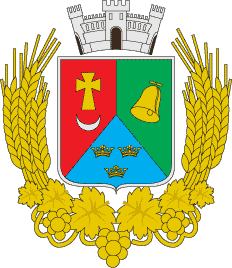
Beryslav Raion

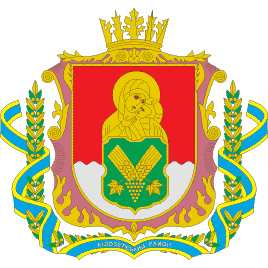
Bilozerka Raion

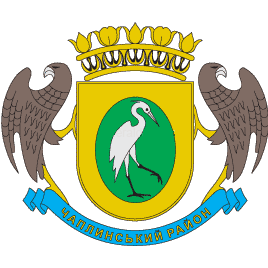
Chaplynka Raion

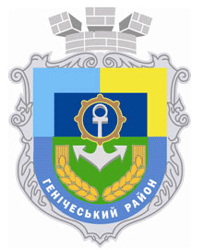
Henichesk Raion

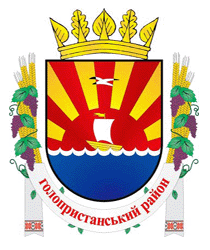
Hola Prystan Raion

Hornostaivka Raion

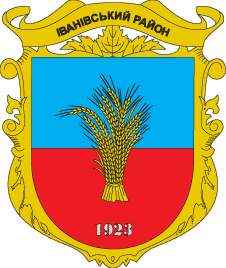
Ivanivka Raion

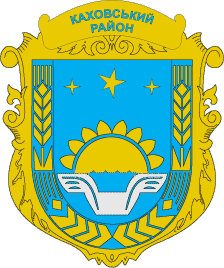
Kakhovka Raion

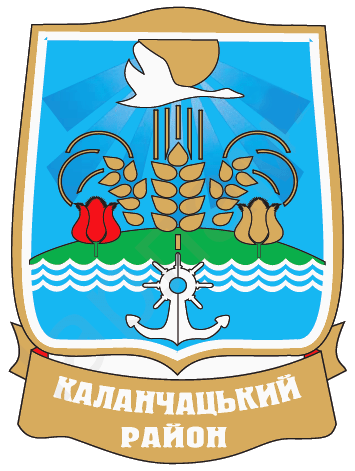
Kalanchak Raion

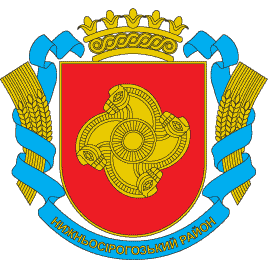
Nyzhni Sirohozy Raion

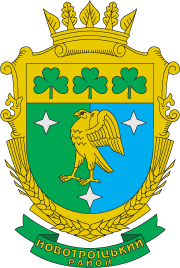
Novotroitske Raion

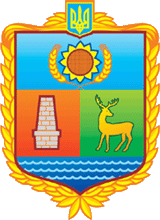
Novovorontsovka Raion

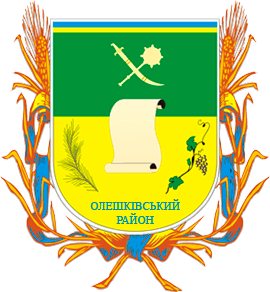
Oleshky Raion

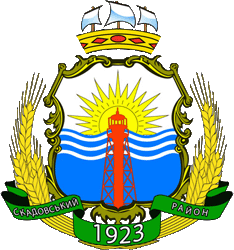
Skadovsk Raion

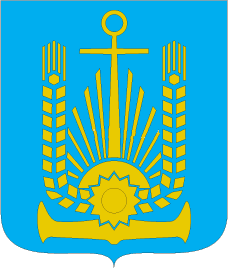
Velyka Lepetykha Raion

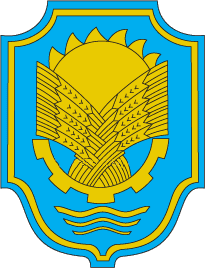
Velyka Oleksandrivka Raion

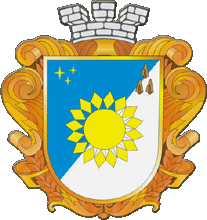
Verkhniy Rohachyk Raion

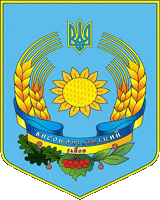
Vysokopillia Raion

=== Khmelnytskyi Oblast ===
Khmelnytskyi

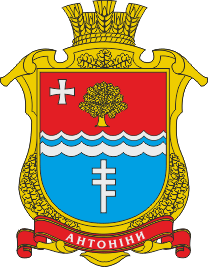
Antoniny

Bazaliia

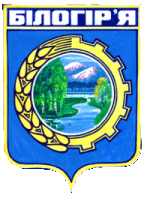
Bilohiria

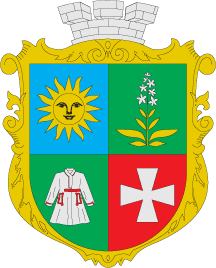
Chemerivtsi

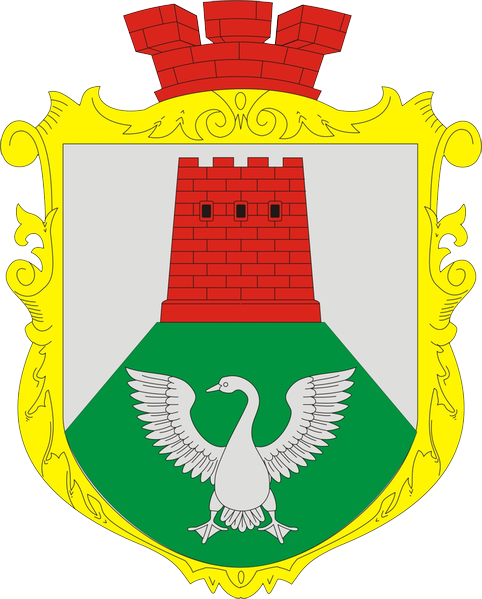
Chornyi Ostriv

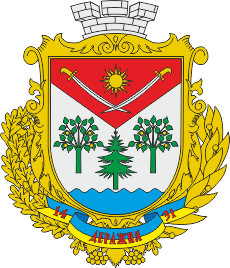
Derazhnia

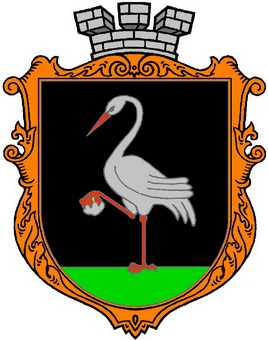
Dunaivtsi

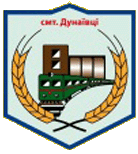
Dunaivtsi

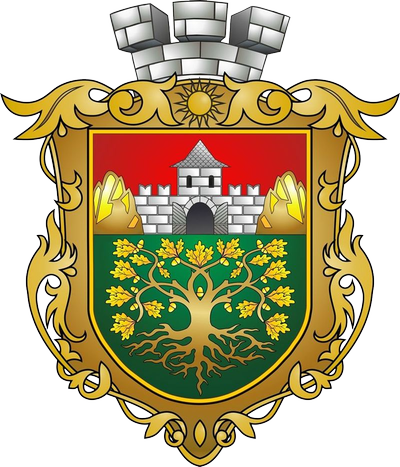
Horodok

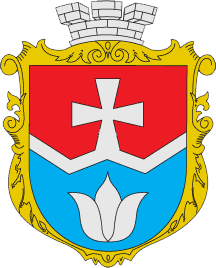
Hrytsiv

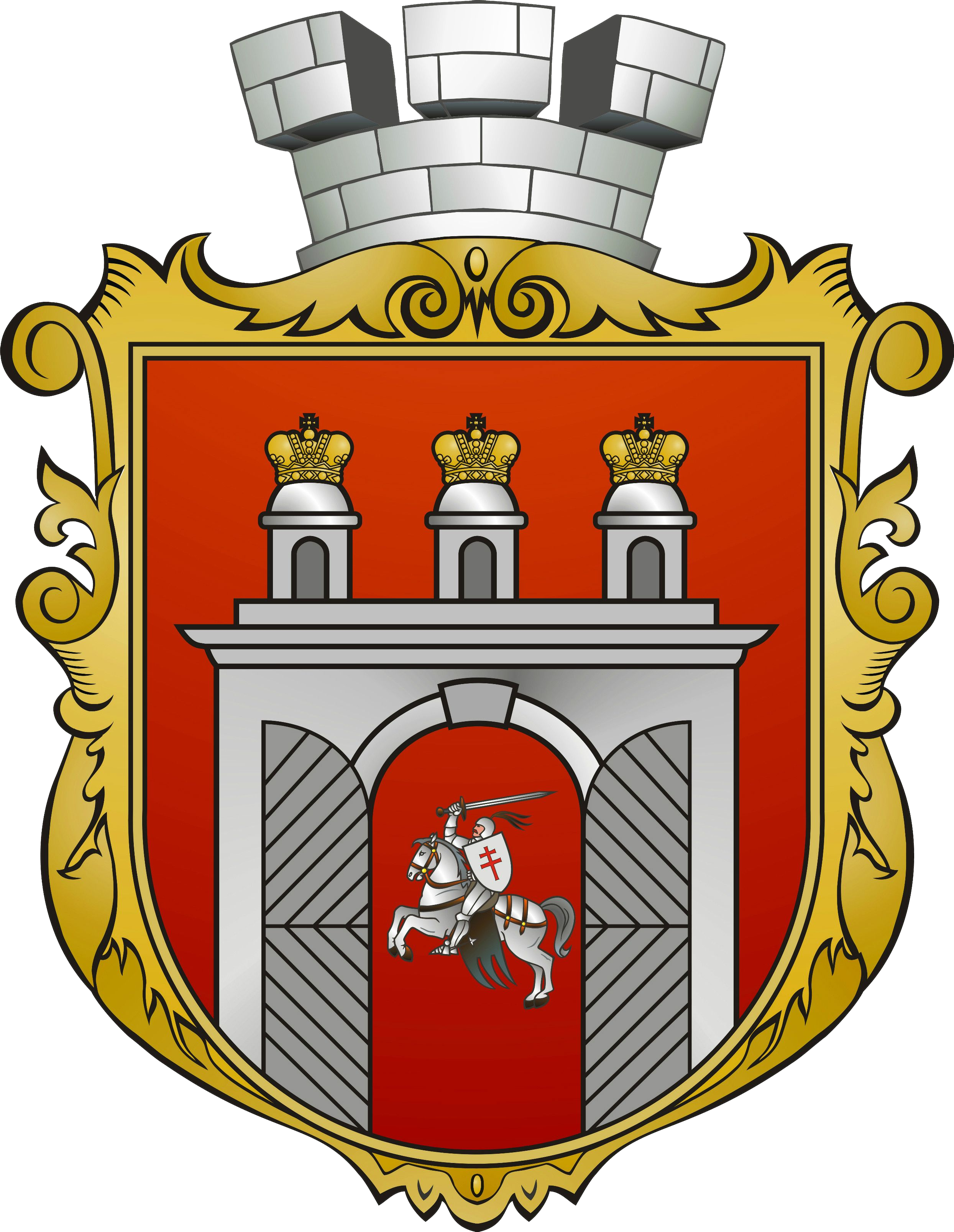
Iziaslav

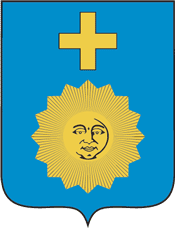
Kamianets-Podilskyi

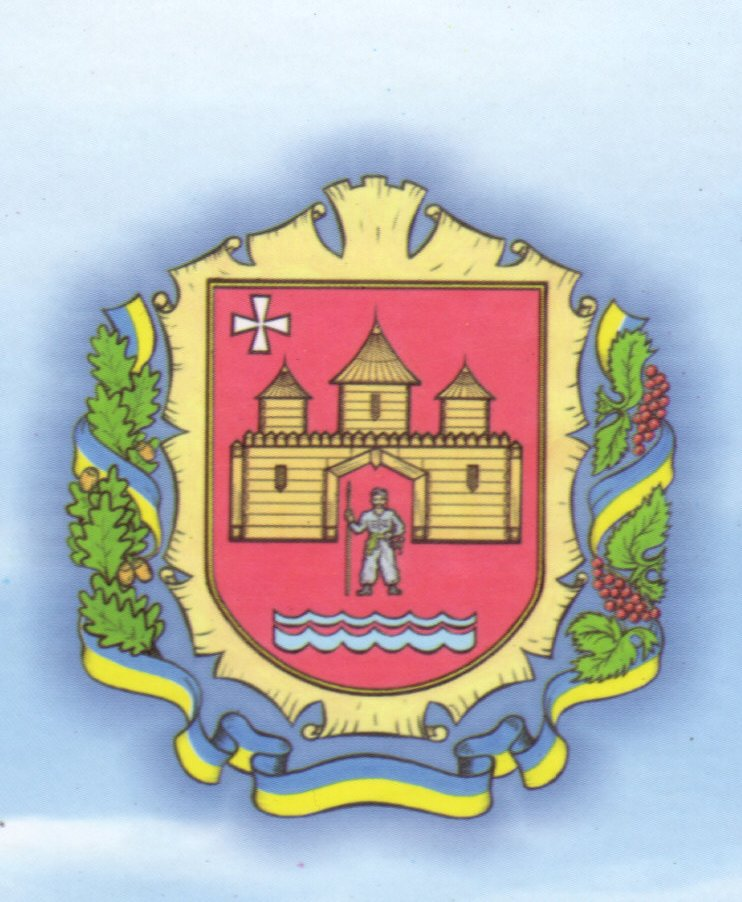
Krasyliv

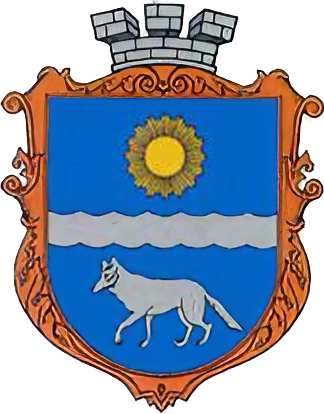
Letychiv

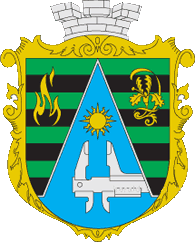
Lozove

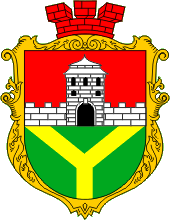
Medzhybizh

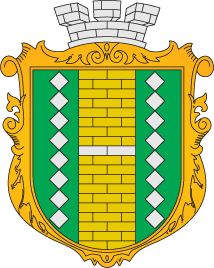
Narkevychi

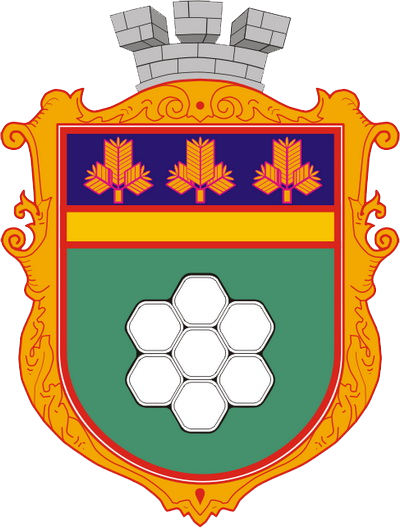
Netishyn

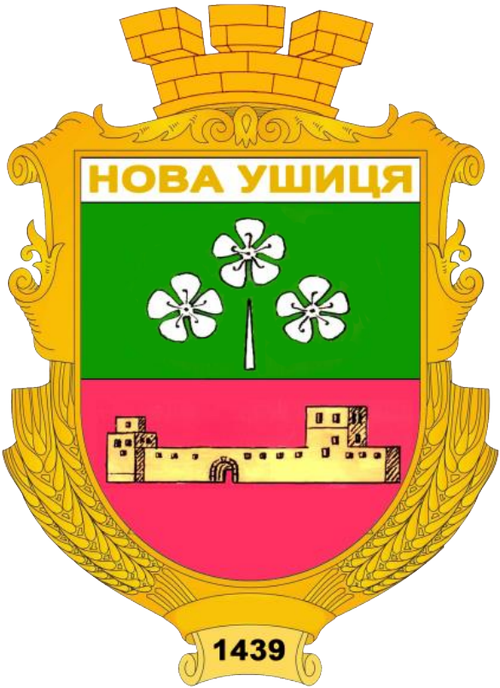
Nova Ushytsia

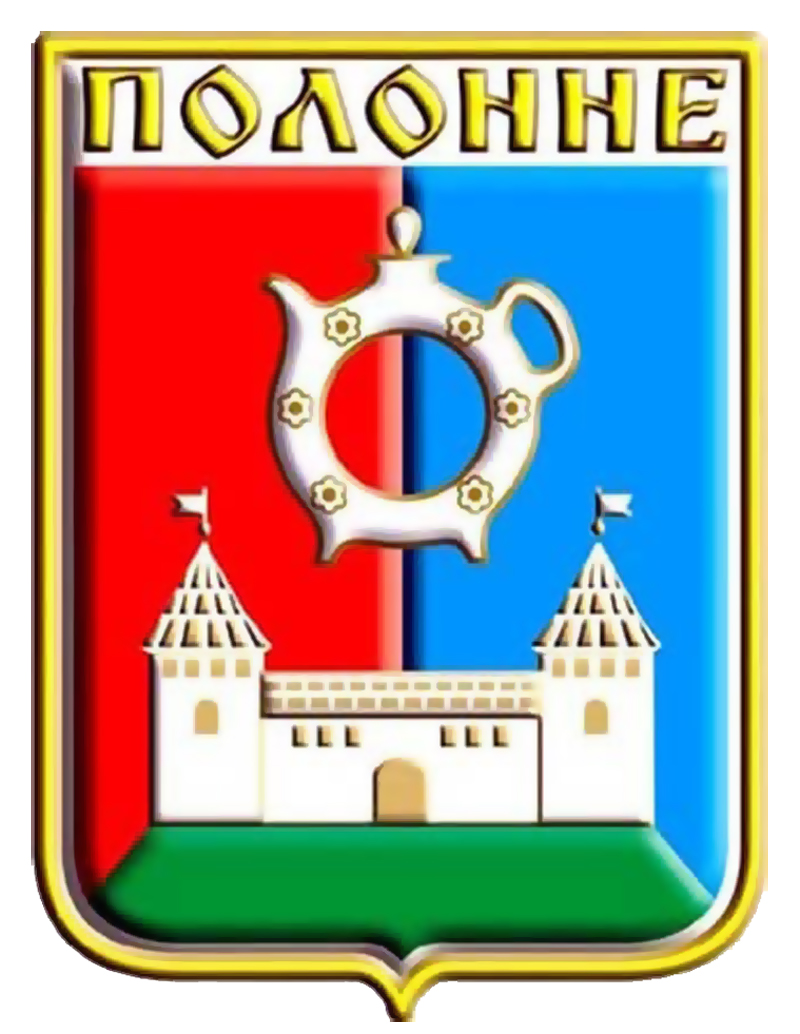
Polonne

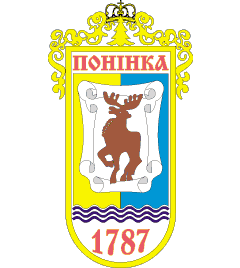
Poninka

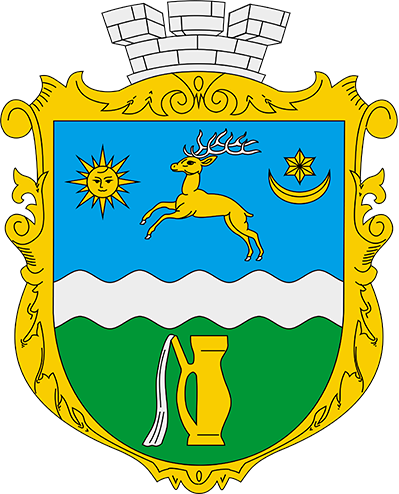
Sataniv

Shepetivka

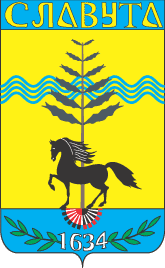
Slavuta

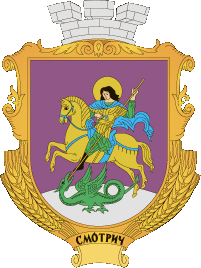
Smotrych

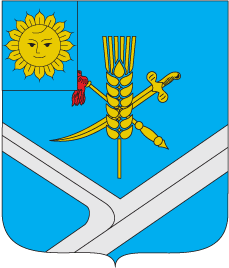
Stara Syniava

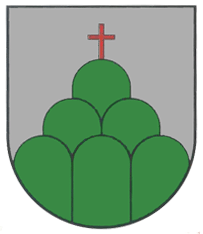
Stara Ushytsia

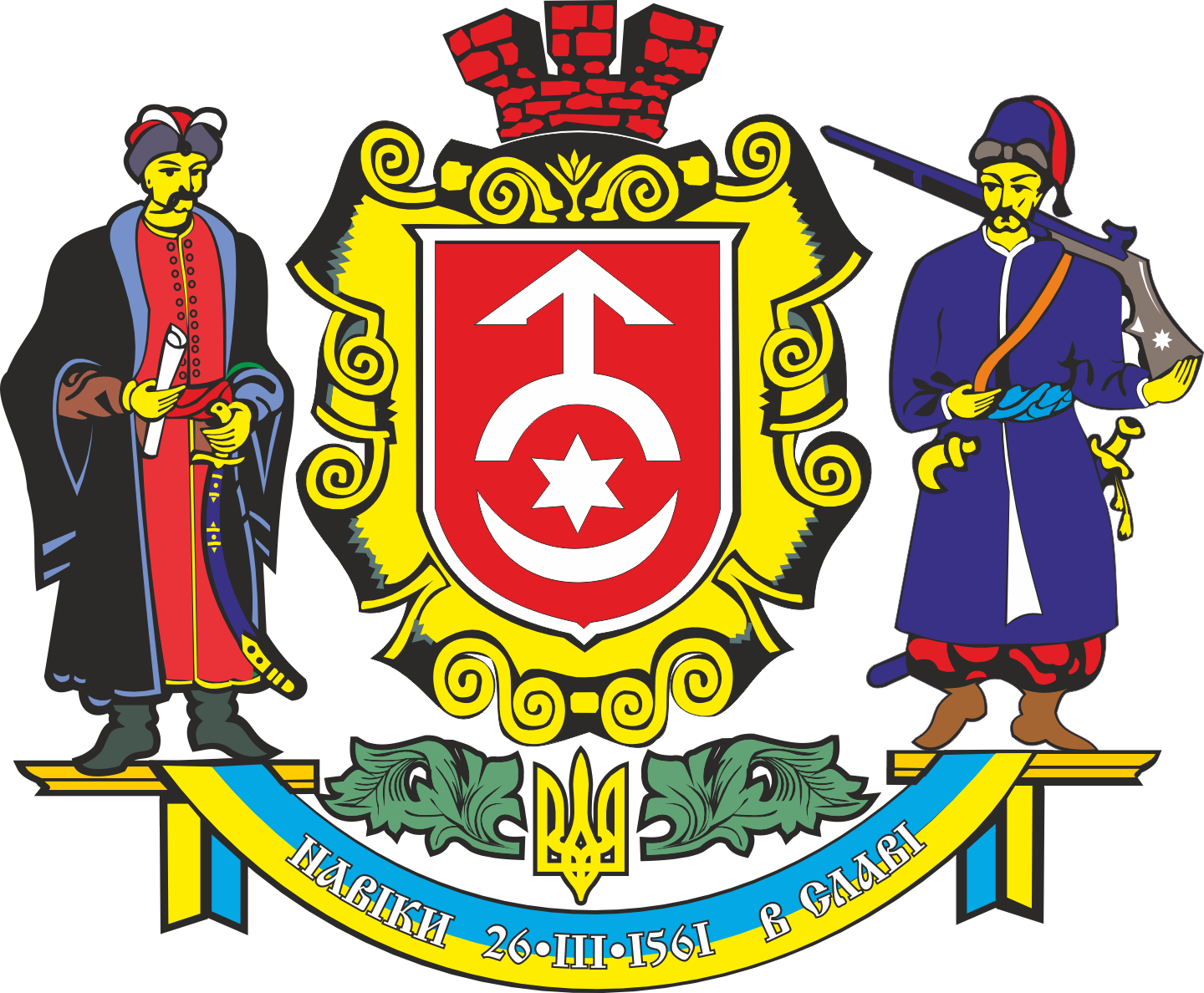
Starokostiantyniv

Teofipol

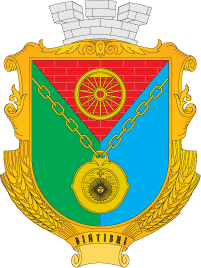
Viitivtsi

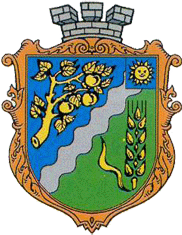
Vinkivtsi

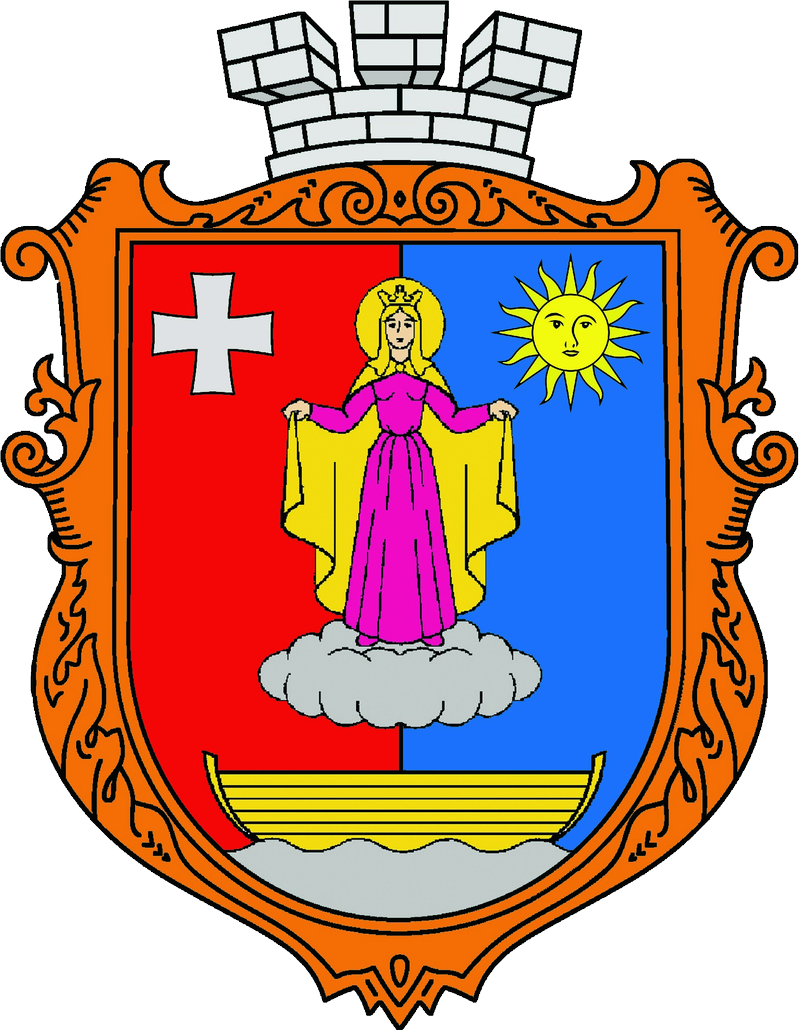
Volochysk

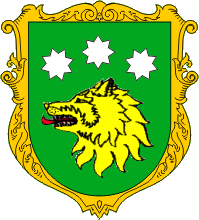
Vovkovyntsi

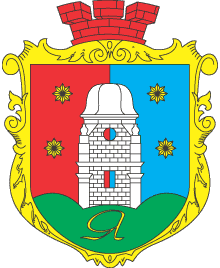
Yampil

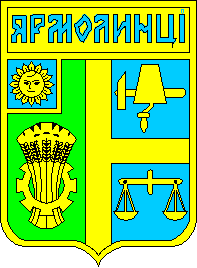
Yarmolyntsi

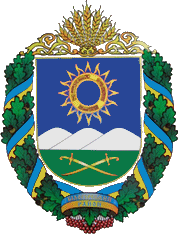
Bilohiria Raion

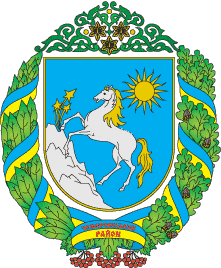
Chemerivtsi Raion

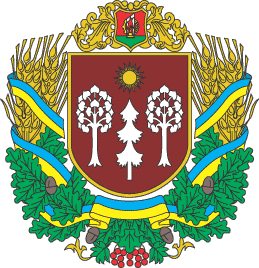
Derazhnia Raion

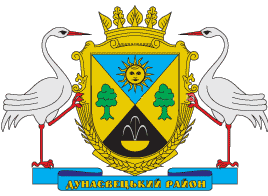
Dunaivtsi Raion

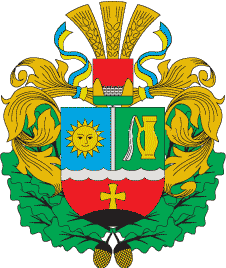
Horodok Raion

Iziaslav Raion

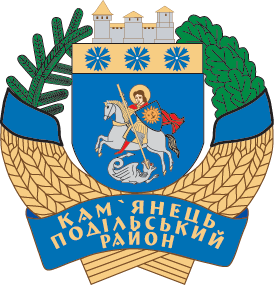
Kamianets-Podilskyi Raion

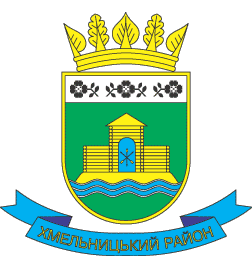
Khmelnytskyi Raion

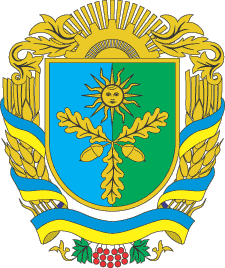
Krasyliv Raion

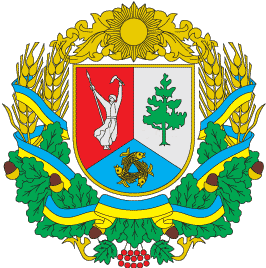
Letychiv Raion

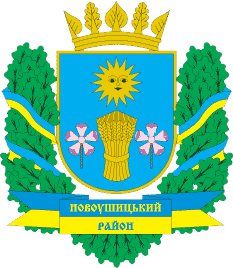
Nova Ushytsia Raion

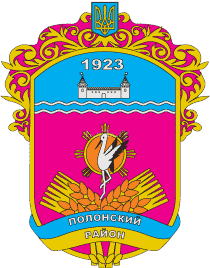
Polonne Raion

Shepetivka Raion

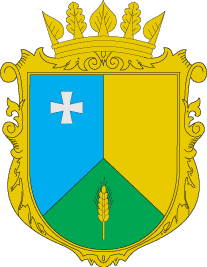
Slavuta Raion

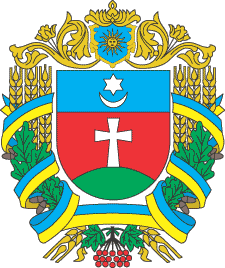
Stara Syniava Raion

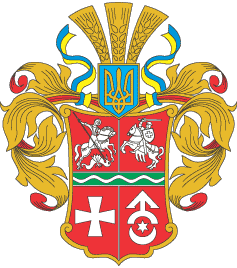
Starokostiantyniv Raion

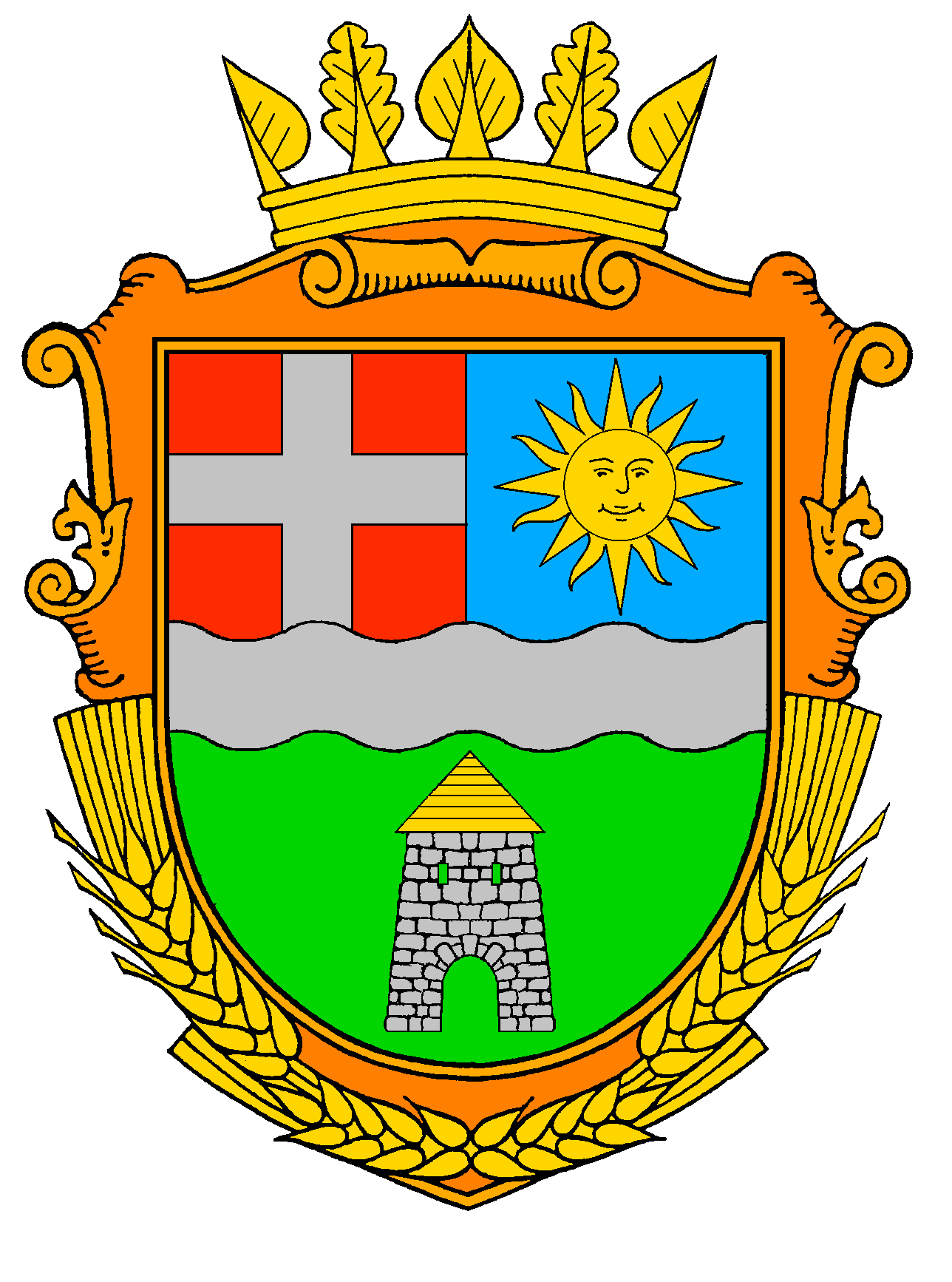
Teofipol Raion

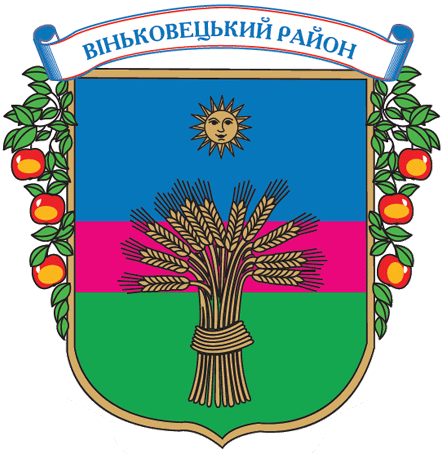
Vinkivtsi Raion

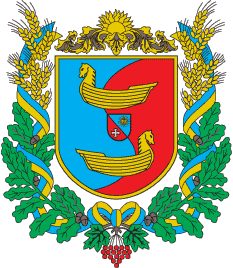
Volochysk Raion

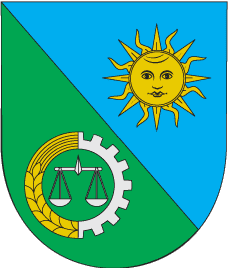
Yarmolyntsi Raion

=== Kyiv Oblast ===
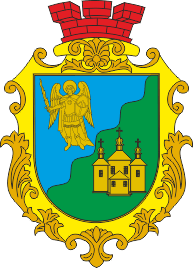
Babyntsi

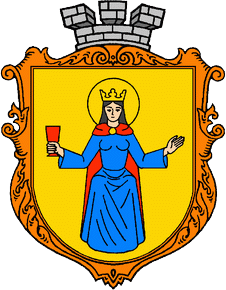
Baryshivka

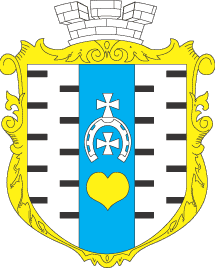
Berezan

Bila Tserkva

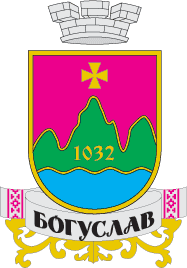
Bohuslav

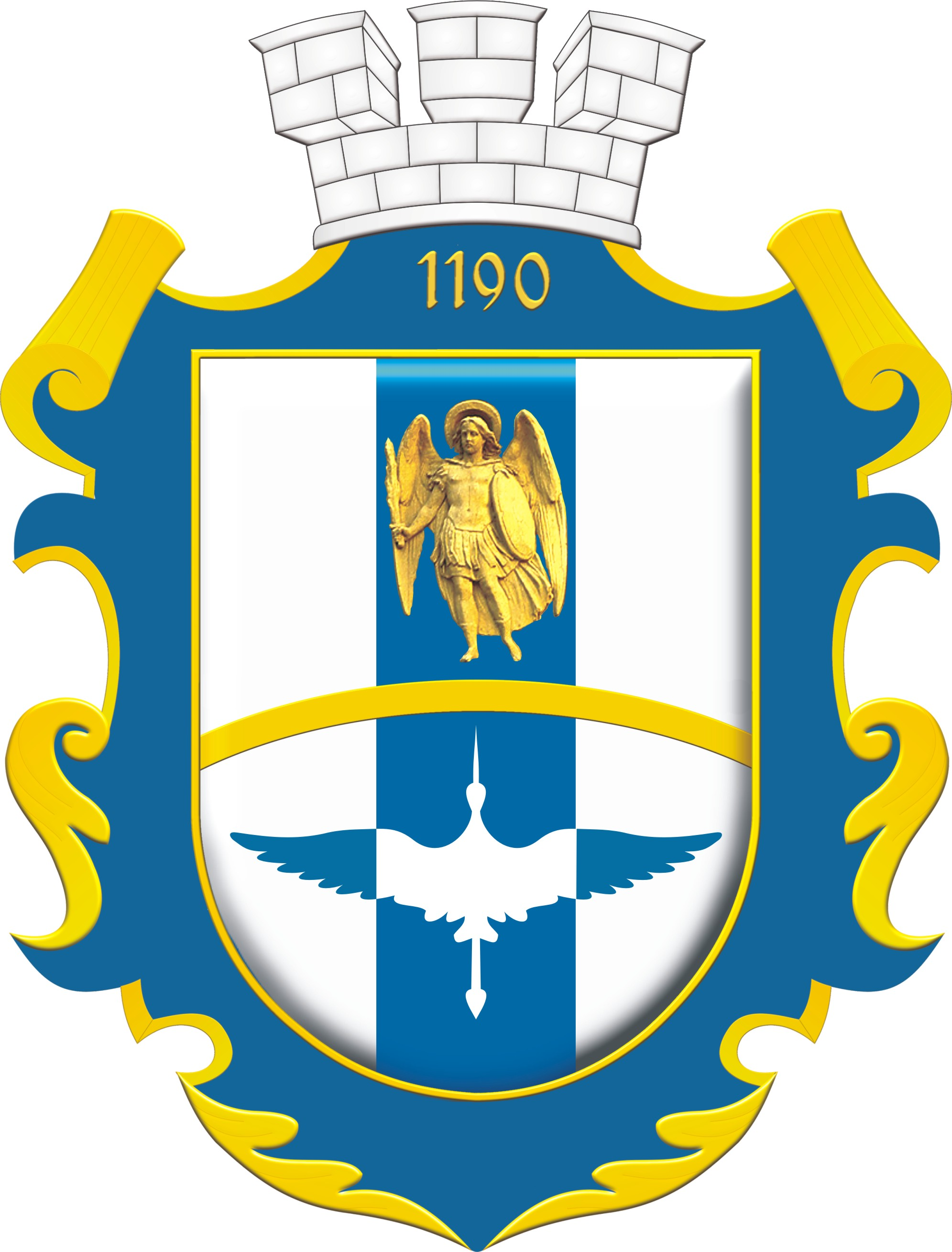
Borodianka

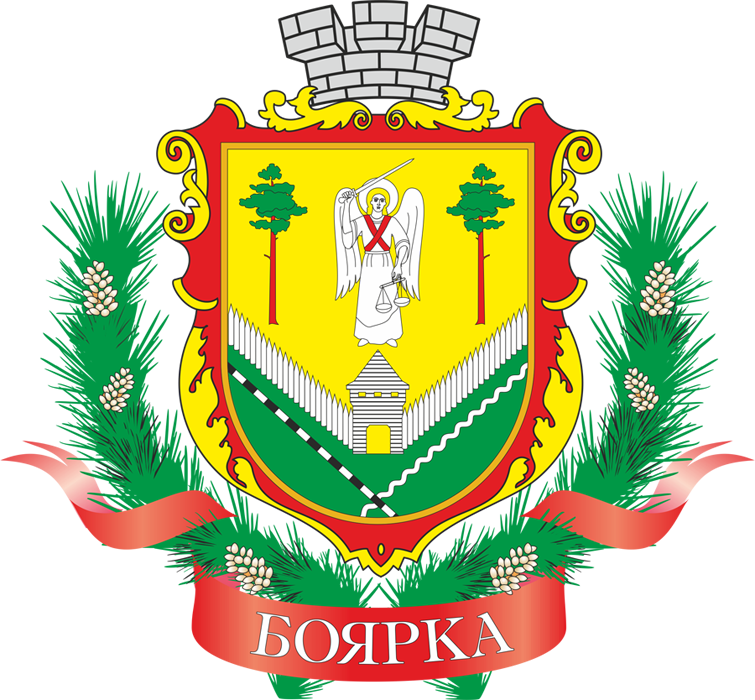
Boiarka

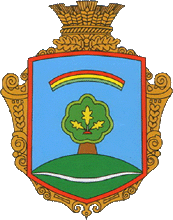
Borova

Boryspil

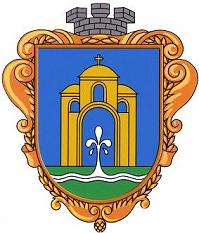
Brovary

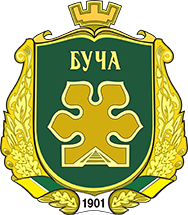
Bucha

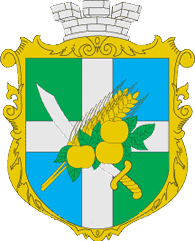
Chabany

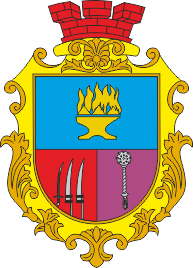
Dymer

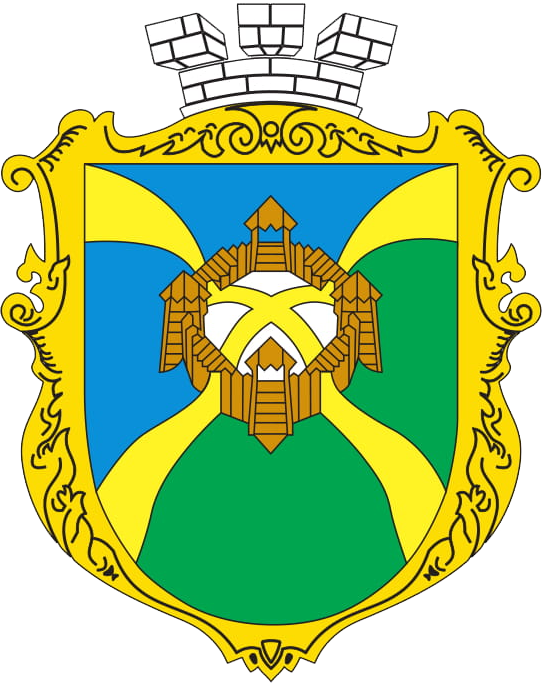
Fastiv

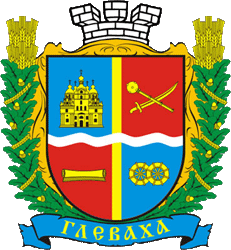
Hlevakha

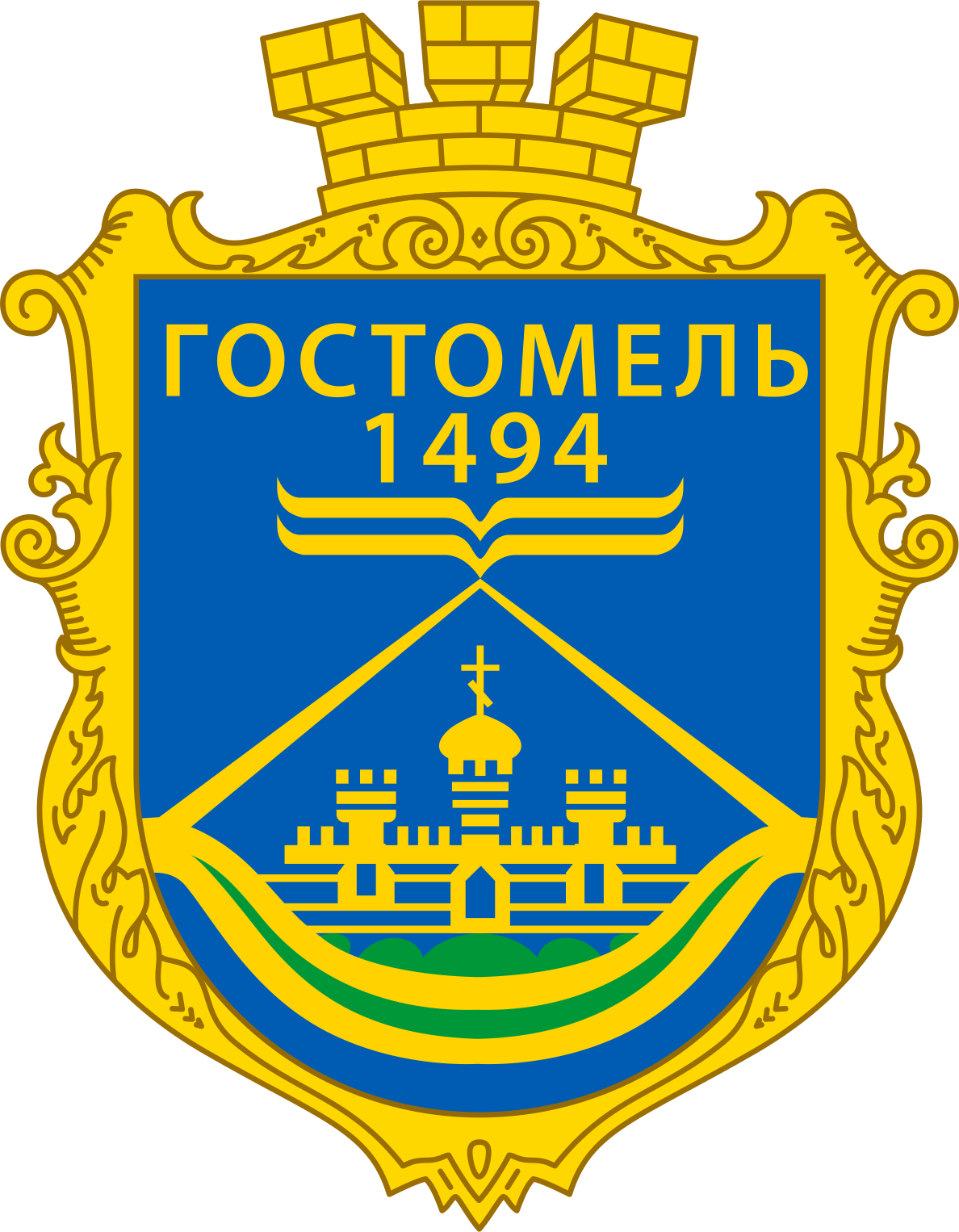
Hostomel

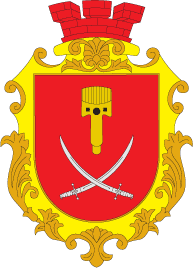
Hrebinky

Irpin

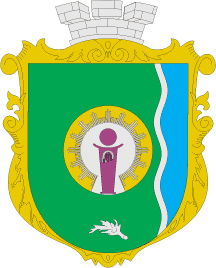
Ivankiv

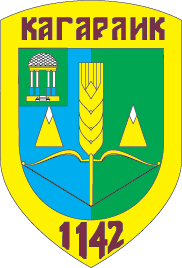
Kaharlyk

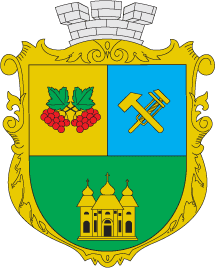
Kalynivka

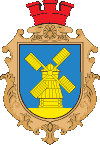
Kalyta

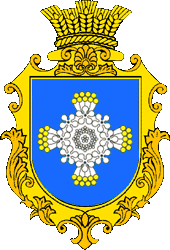
Kalynivka

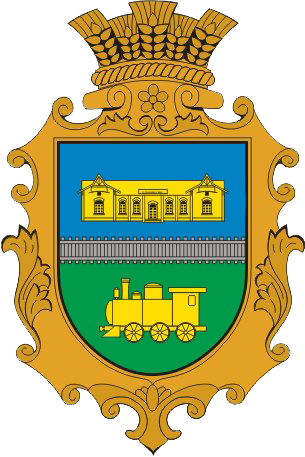
Klavdiievo-Tarasove

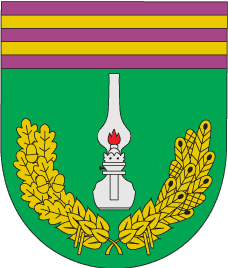
Kodra

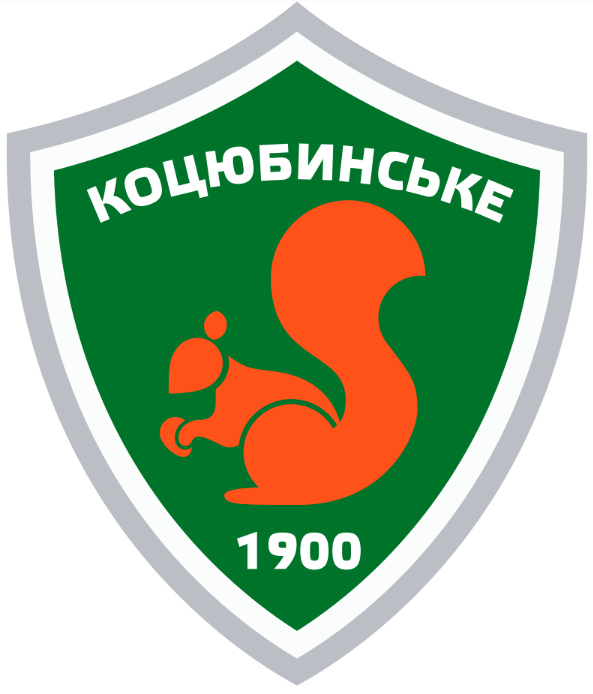
Kotsiubynske

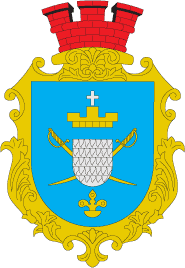
Kozhanka

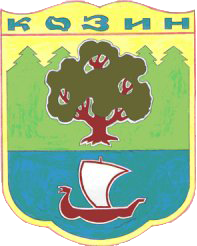
Kozyn

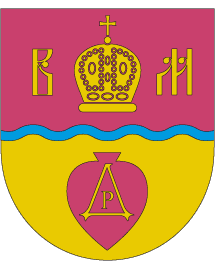
Makariv

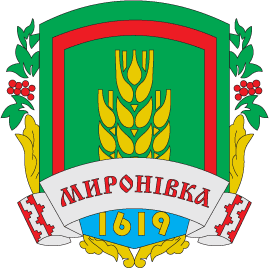
Myronivka

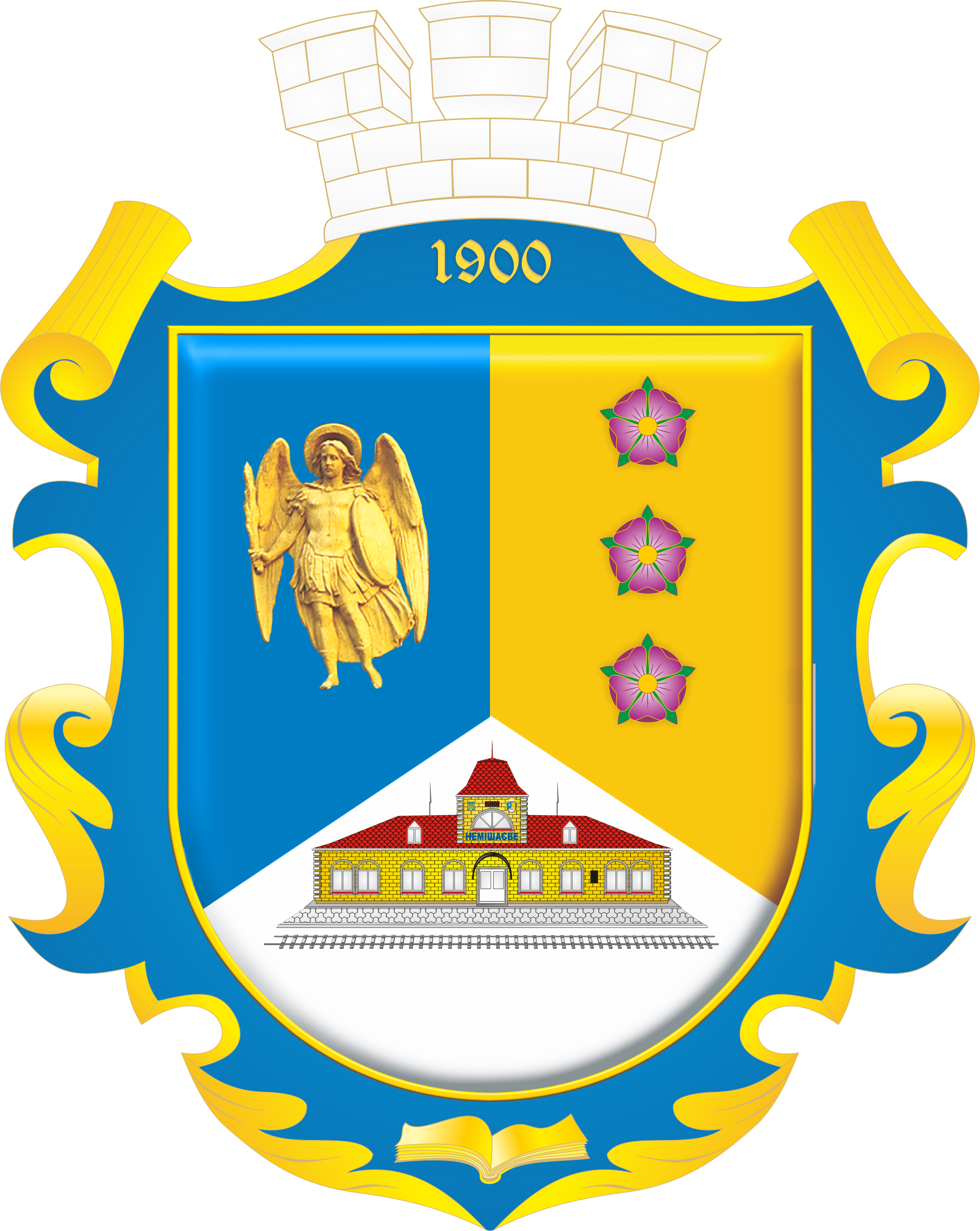
Nemishaieve

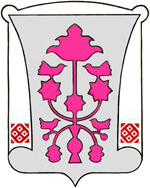
Obukhiv

Pereiaslav

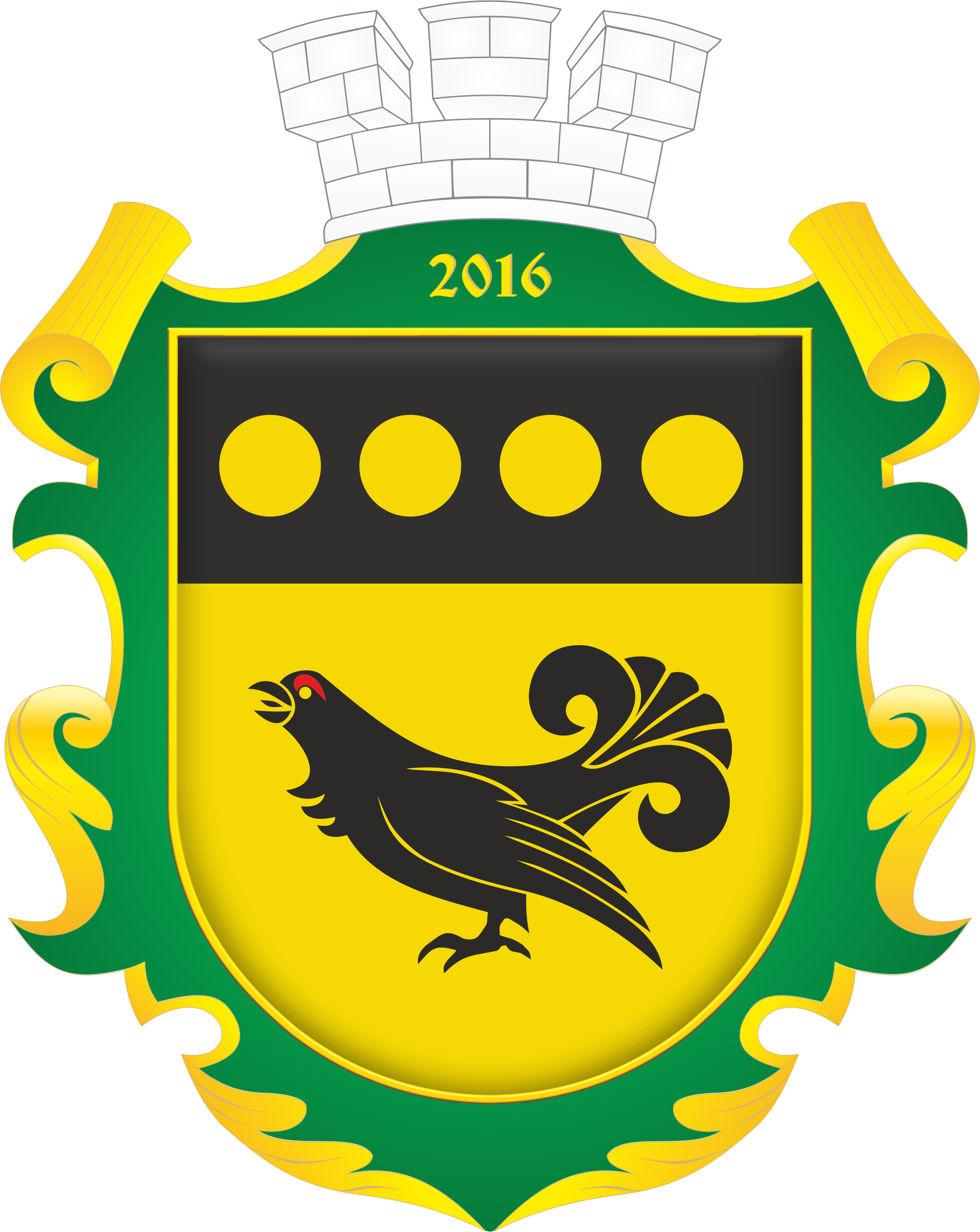
Piskivka

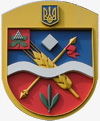
Rokytne

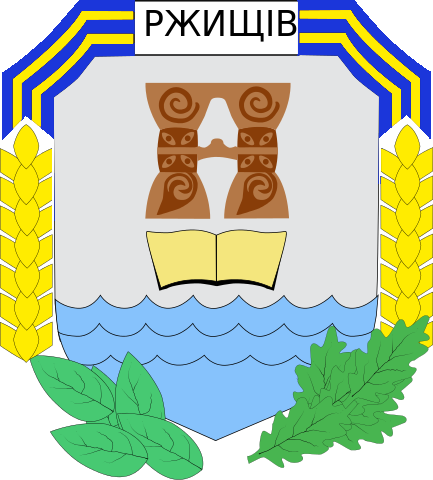
Rzhyshchiv

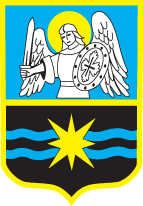
Slavutych

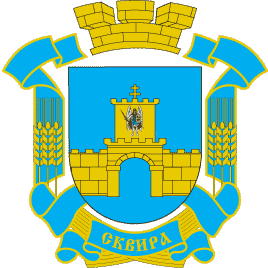
Skvyra

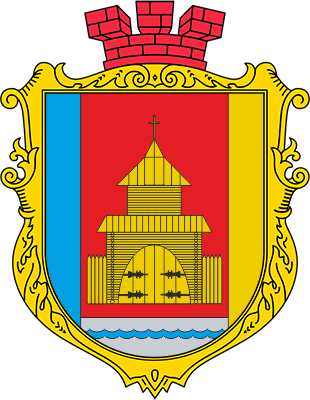
Stavyshche

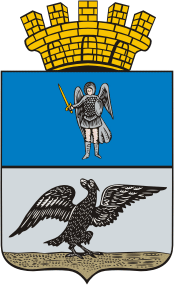
Tarashcha

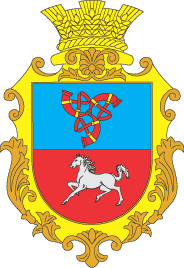
Terezyne

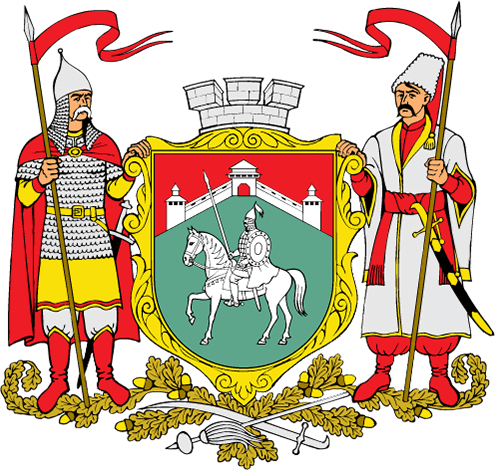
Tetiiv

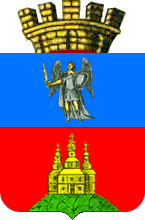
Vasylkiv

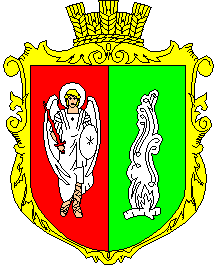
Velyka Dymerka

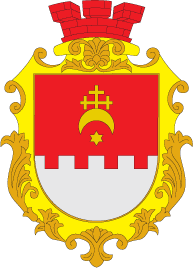
Volodarka

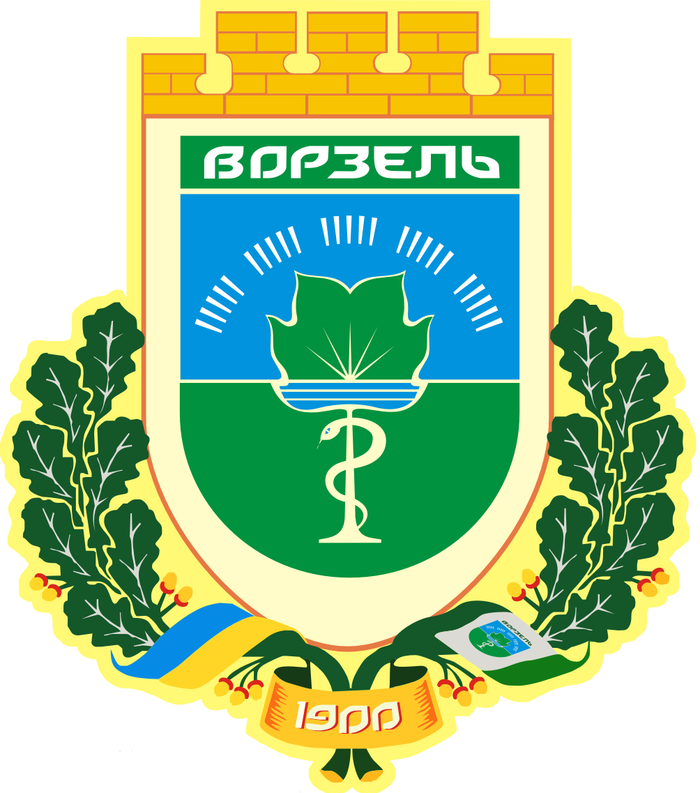
Vorzel

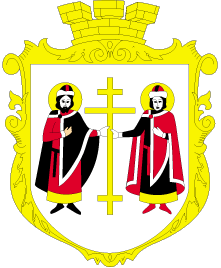
Vyshhorod

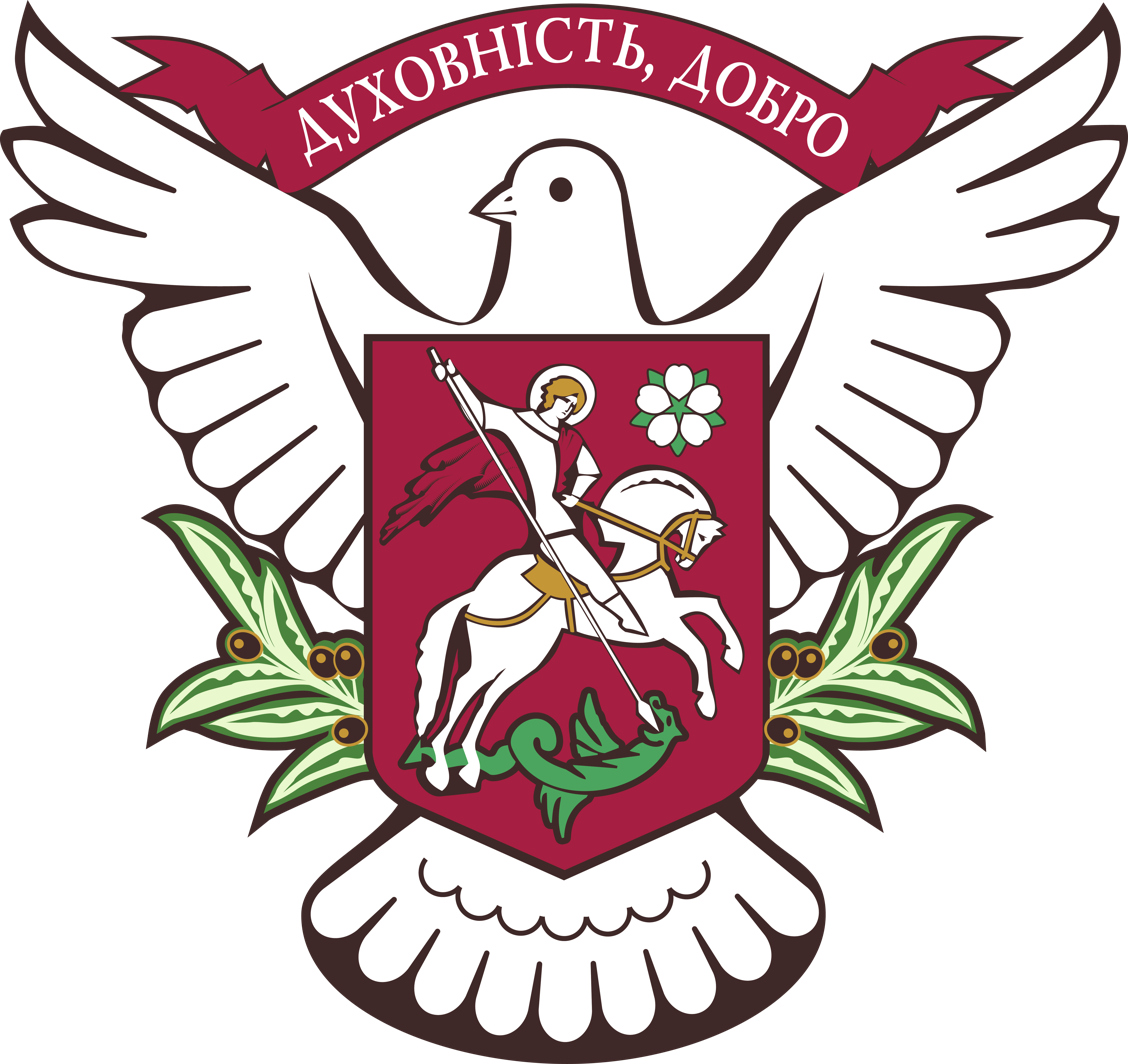
Vyshneve

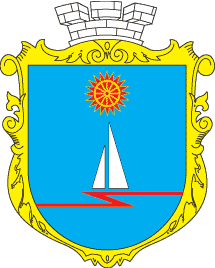
Ukrainka

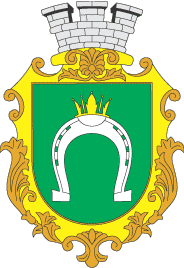
Uzyn

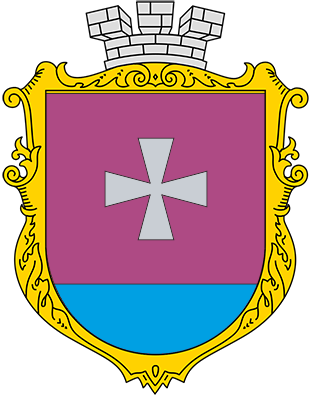
Yahotyn

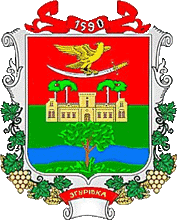
Zghurivka

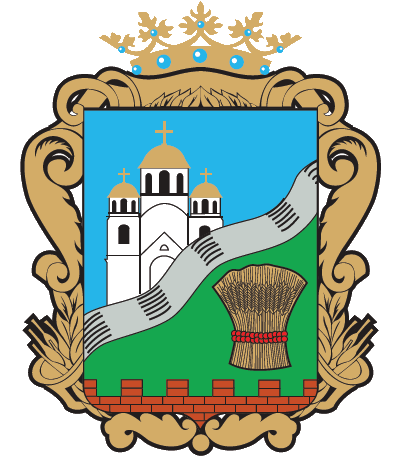
Baryshivka Raion

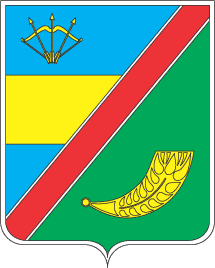
Bila Tserkva Raion

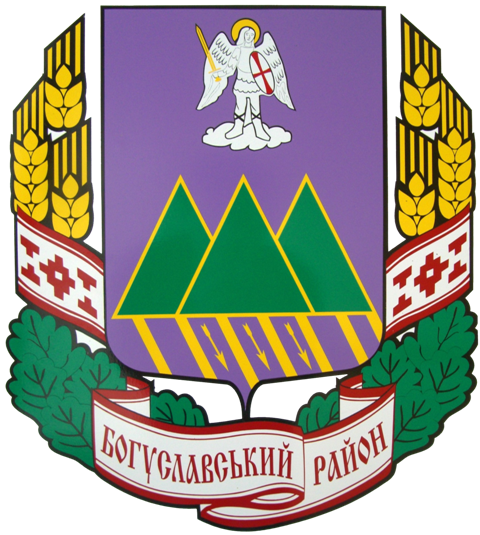
Bohuslav Raion

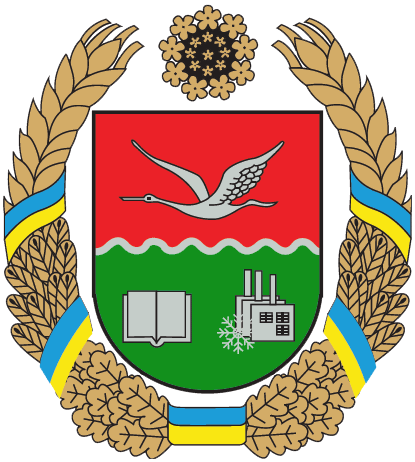
Borodianka Raion

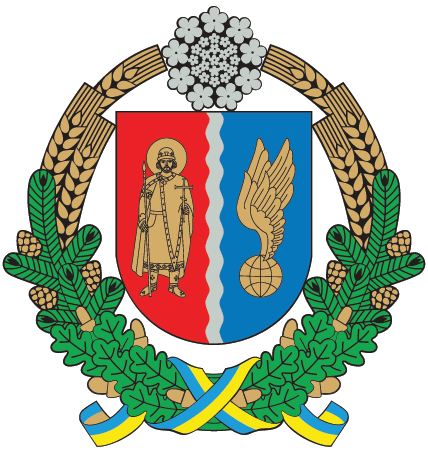
Boryspil Raion

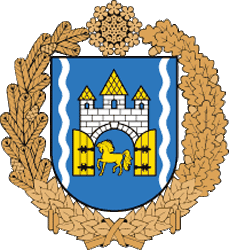
Brovary Raion

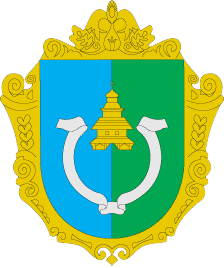
Fastiv Raion

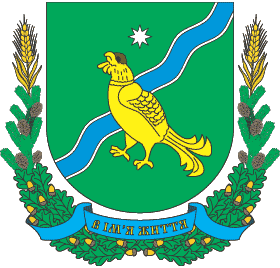
Ivankiv Raion

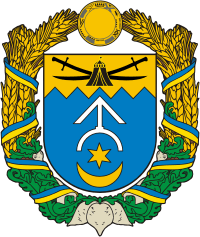
Kaharlyk Raion

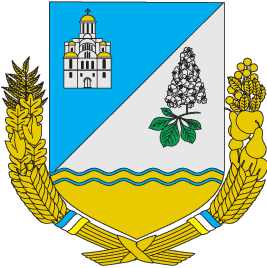
Kyiv-Sviatoshyn Raion

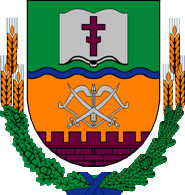
Makariv Raion

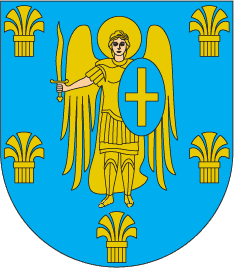
Myronivka Raion

Obukhiv Raion

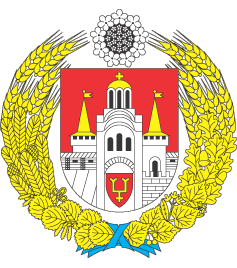
Pereiaslav-Khmelnytskyi Raion

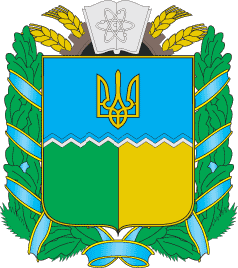
Poliske Raion

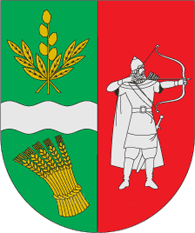
Rokytne Raion

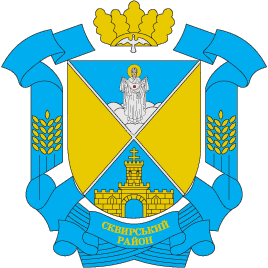
Skvyra Raion

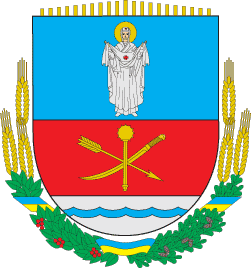
Stavyshche Raion

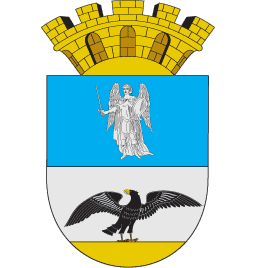
Tarashcha Raion

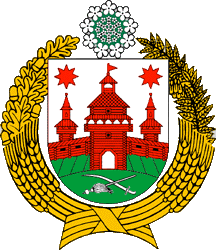
Tetiiv Raion

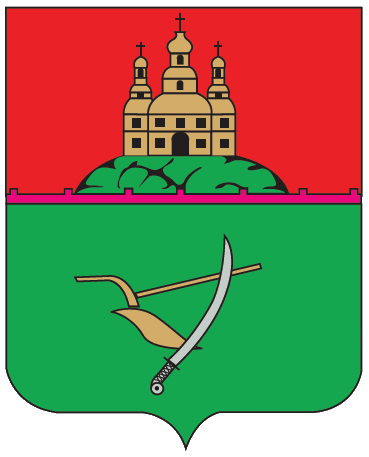
Vasylkiv Raion

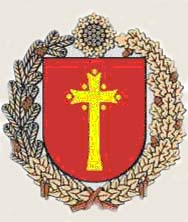
Volodarka Raion

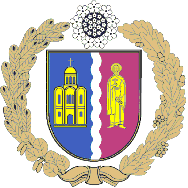
Vyshhorod Raion

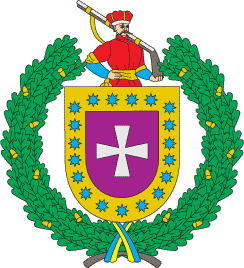
Yahotyn Raion

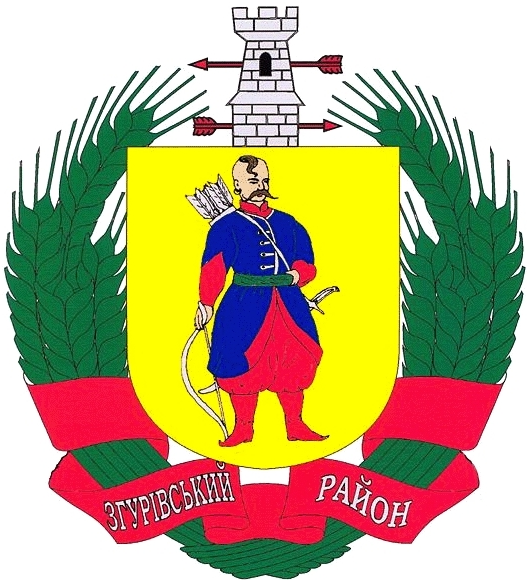
Zghurivka Raion

=== Kirovohrad Oblast ===
Kropyvnytskyi

Bobrynets

Dolynska

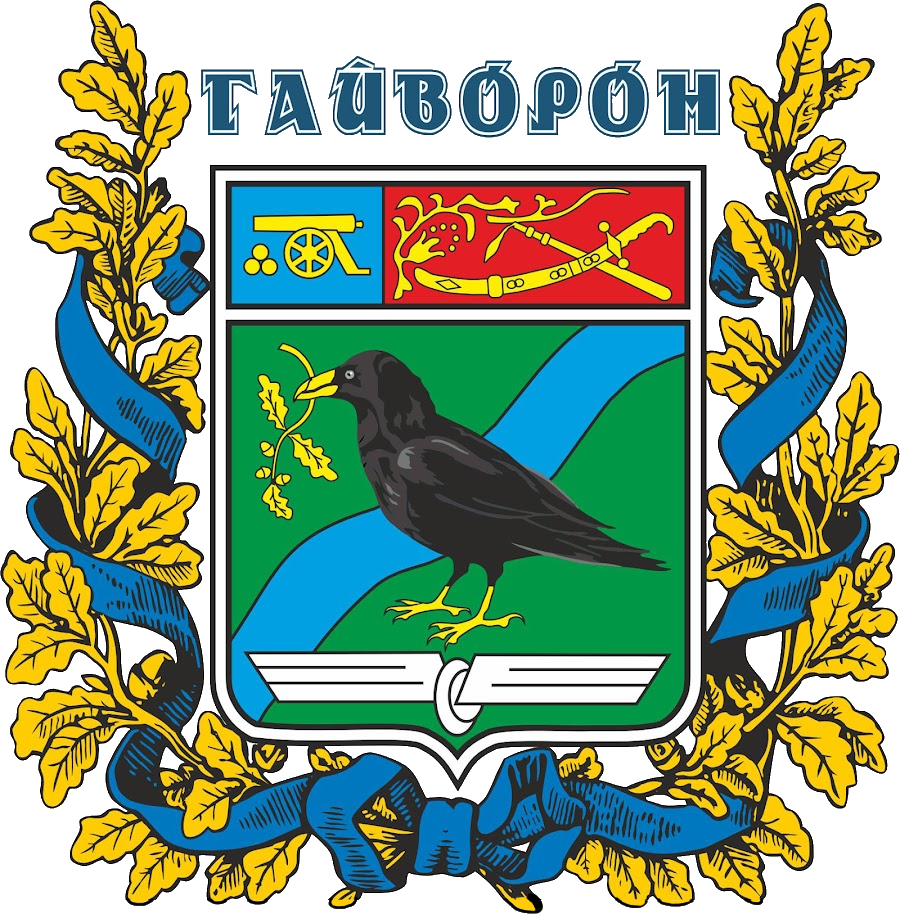
Haivoron

Mala Vyska

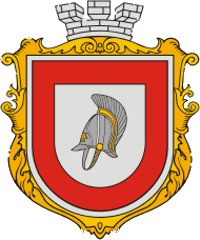
Novhorodka

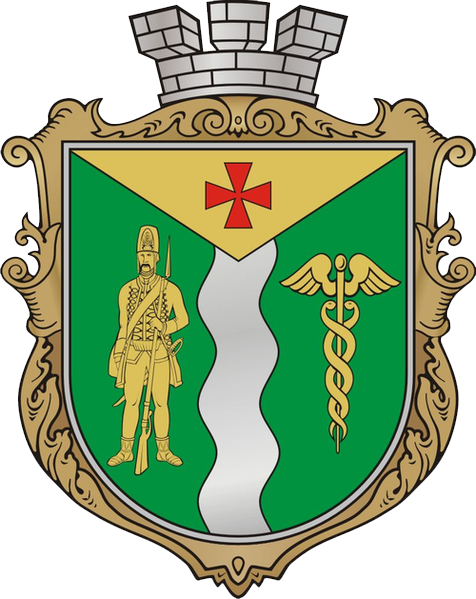
Novomyrhorod

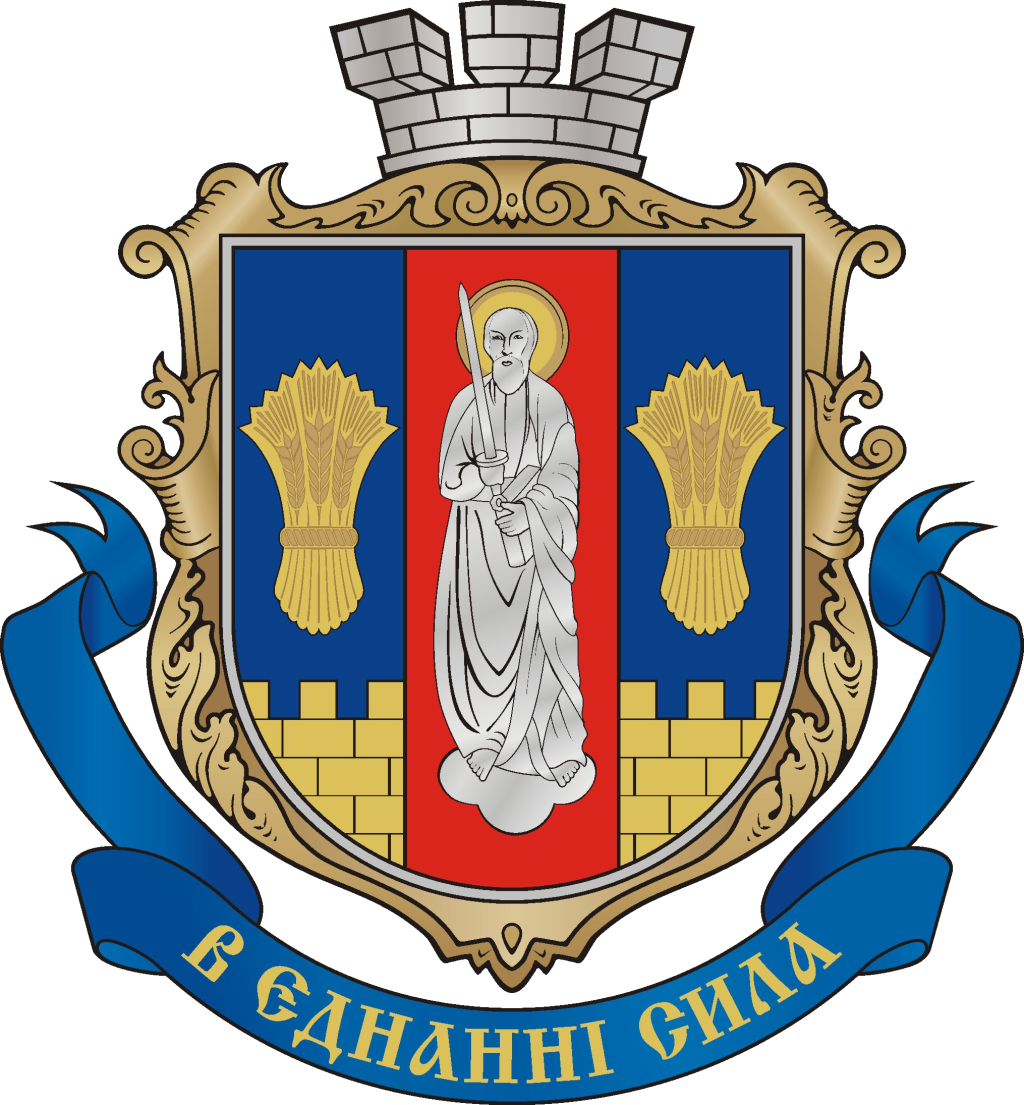
Novoukrainka

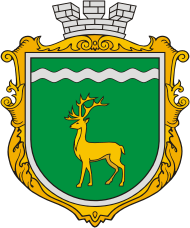
Oleksandrivka

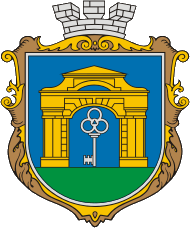
Onufriivka

Oleksandriia

Pomichna

Petrove

Smoline

Svitlovodsk

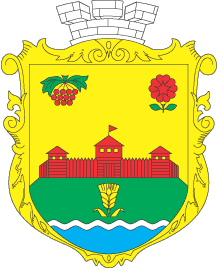
Vilshanka

Znamianka

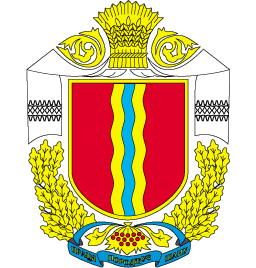
Blahovishchenske Raion

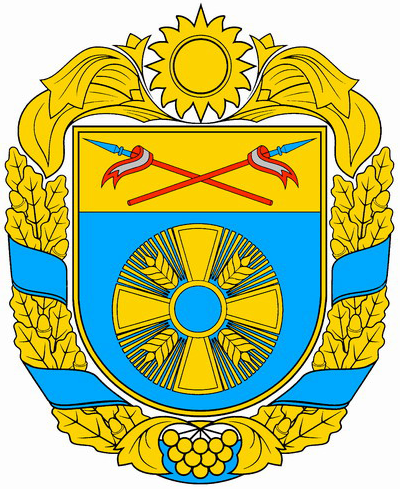
Bobrynets Raion

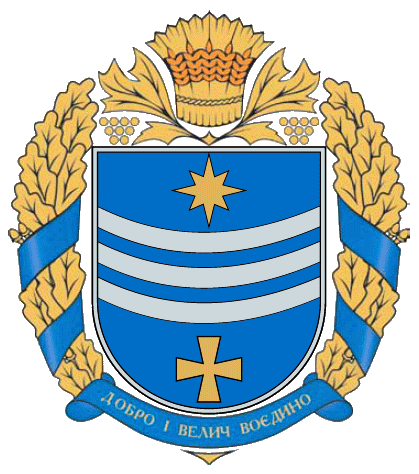
Dobrovelychkivka Raion

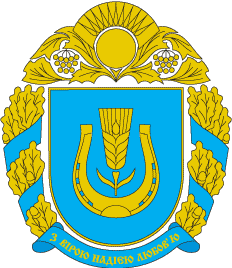
Dolynska Raion

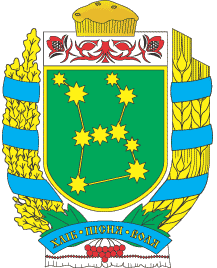
Haivoron Raion

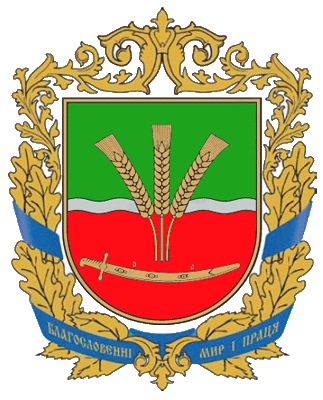
Holovanivsk Raion

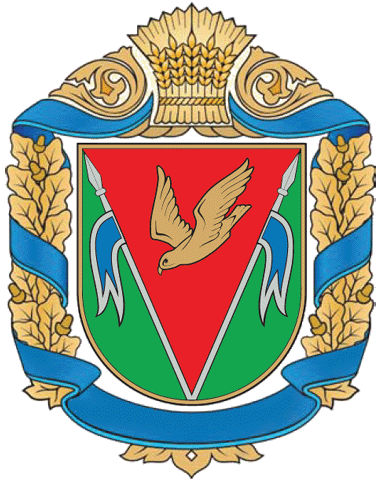
Kompaniivka Raion

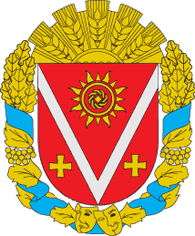
Kropyvnytskyi Raion

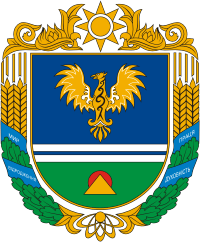
Mala Vyska Raion

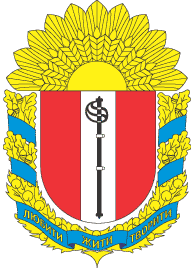
Novhorodka Raion

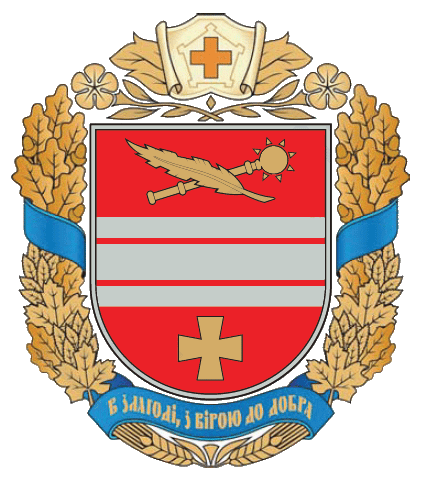
Novoarkhanhelsk Raion

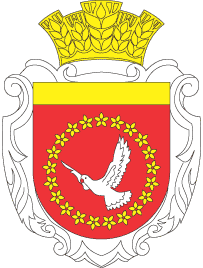
Novomyrhorod Raion

Novoukrainka Raion

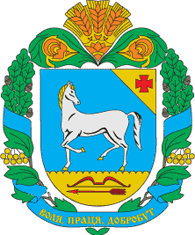
Oleksandriia Raion

Oleksandrivka Raion

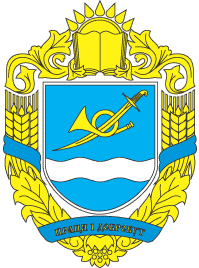
Onufriivka Raion

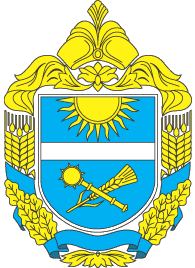
Petrove Raion

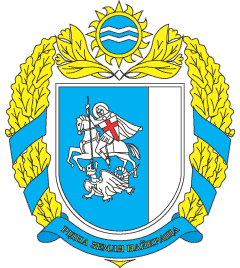
Svitlovodsk Raion

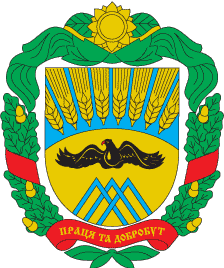
Ustynivka Raion

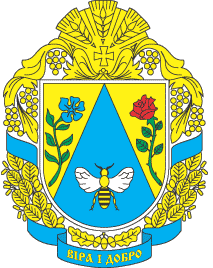
Vilshanka Raion

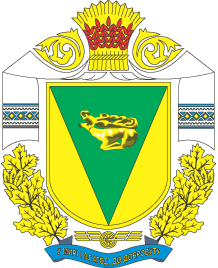
Znamianka Raion

=== Luhansk Oblast ===
Luhansk

Alchevsk

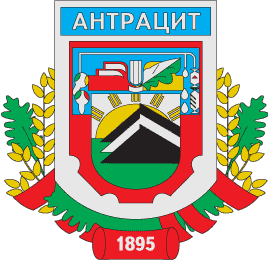
Antratsyt

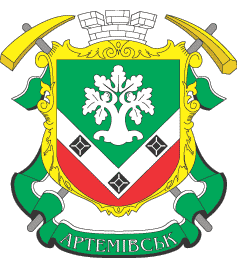
Artemivsk

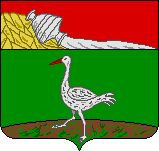
Bilovodsk

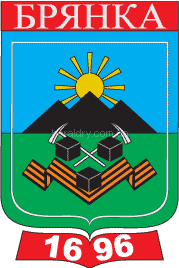
Brianka

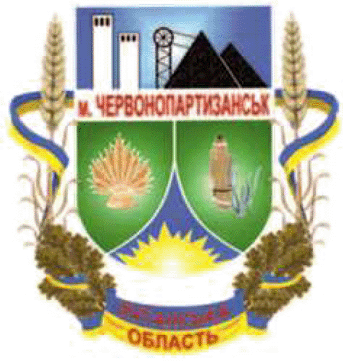
Chervonopartyzansk

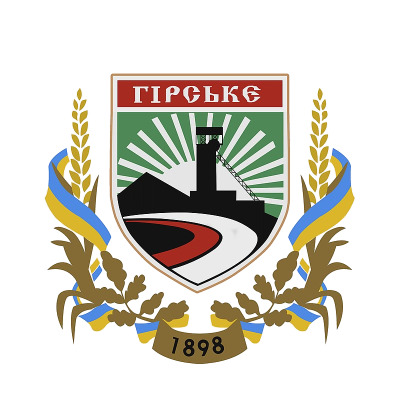
Hirske

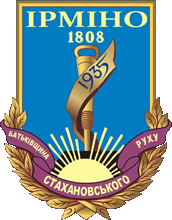
Irmino

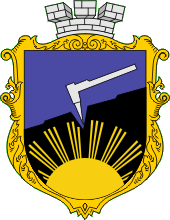
Kirovsk

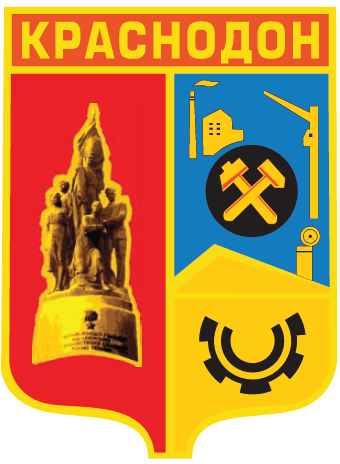
Krasnodon

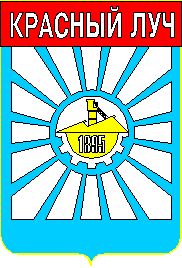
Krasnyi Luch

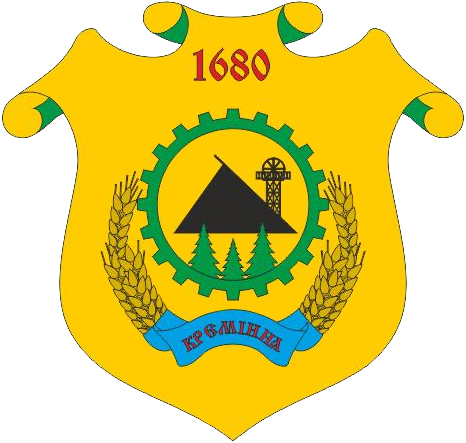
Kreminna

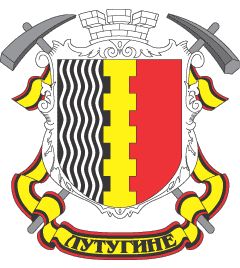
Lutuhyne

Lysychansk

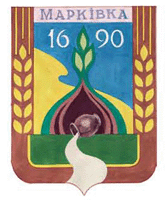
Markivka

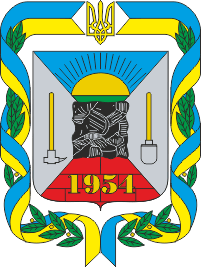
Molodohvardiisk

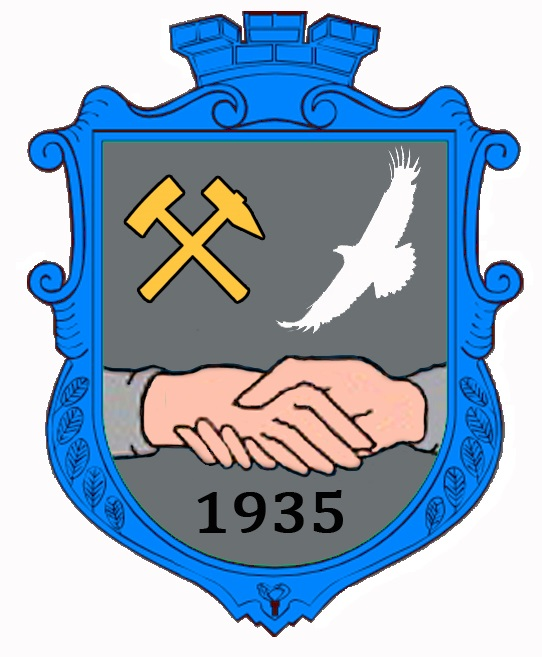
Novodruzhesk

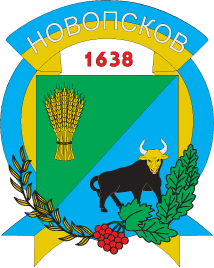
Novopskov

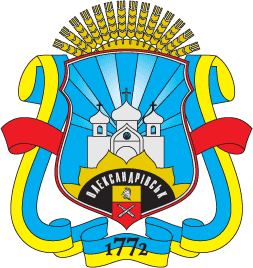
Oleksandrivsk

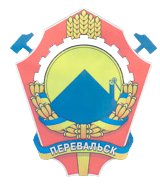
Perevalsk

Pervomaisk

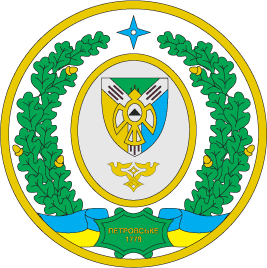
Petrovske

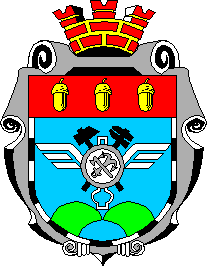
Popasna

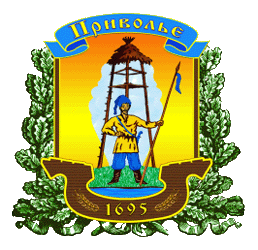
Pryvillia

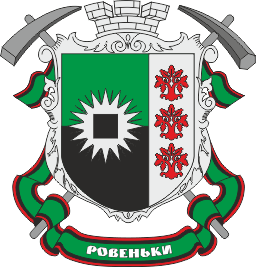
Rovenky

Rubizhne

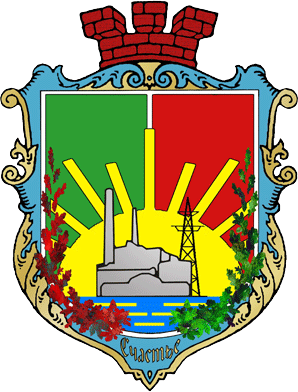
Shchastia

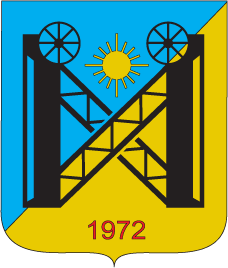
Sukhodilsk

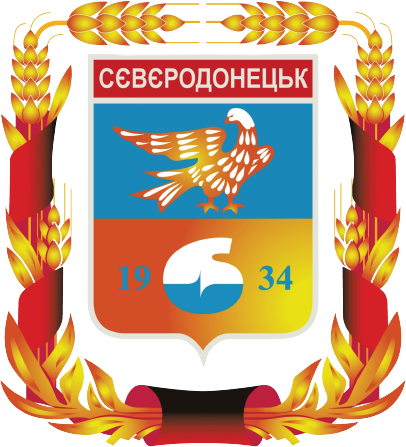
Sievierodonetsk

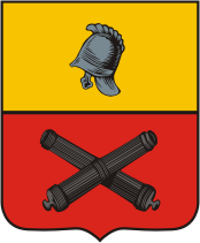
Slovianoserbsk

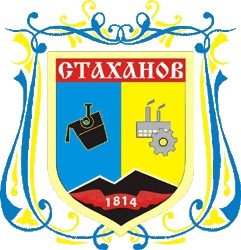
Kadiivka

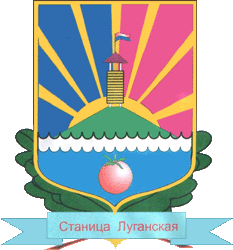
Stanytsia Luhanska

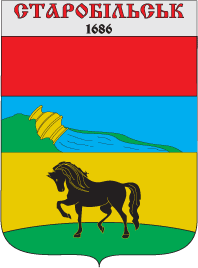
Starobilsk

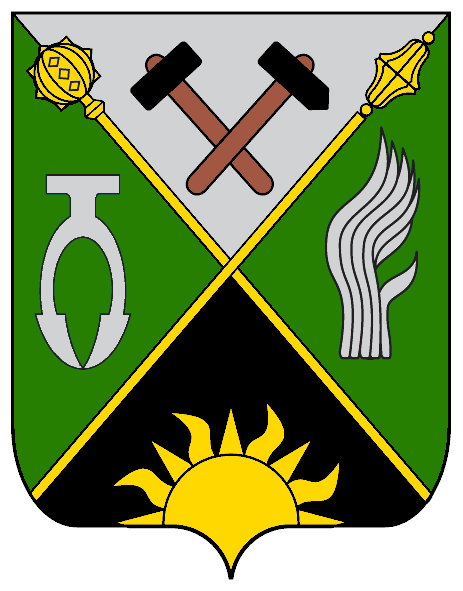
Sverdlovsk

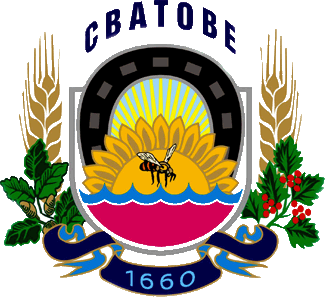
Svatove

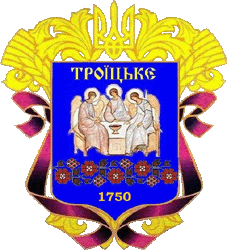
Troitske

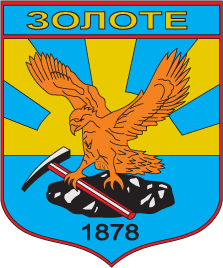
Zolote

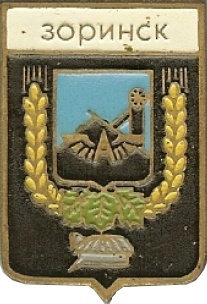
Zorynsk

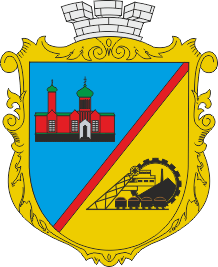
Zymohiria

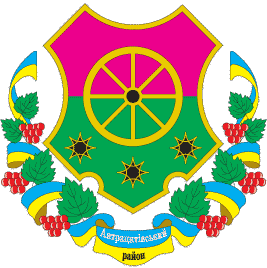
Antratsyt Raion

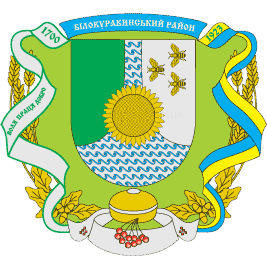
Bilokurakyne Raion

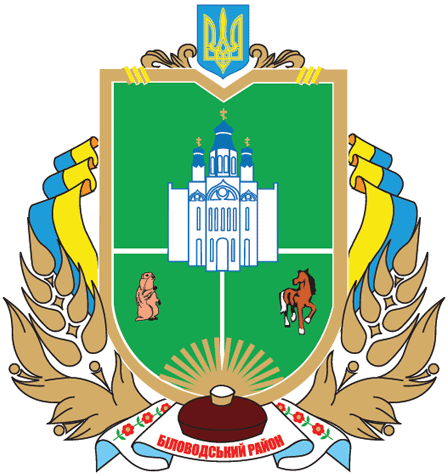
Bilovodsk Raion

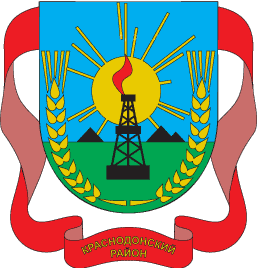
Krasnodon Raion

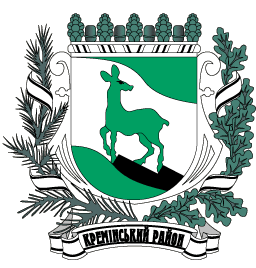
Kreminna Raion

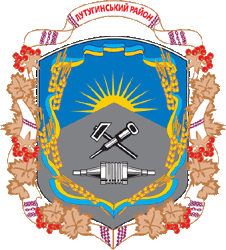
Lutuhyne Raion

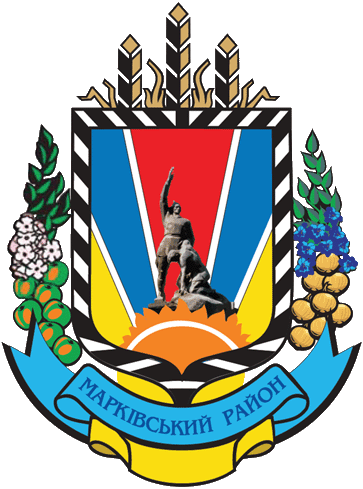
Markivka Raion

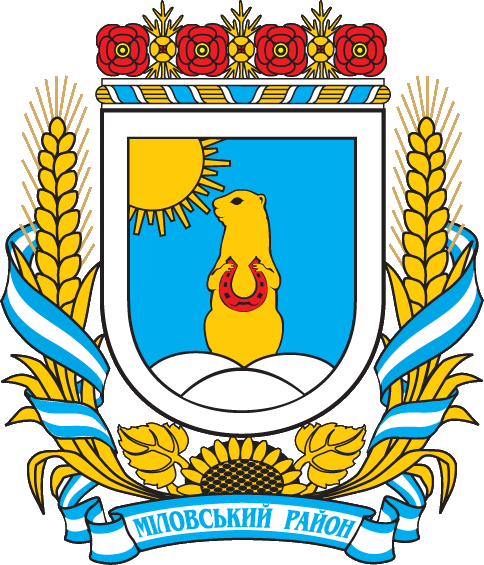
Milove Raion

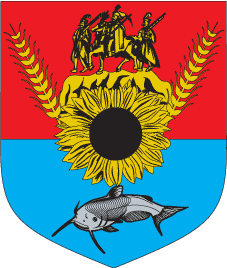
Novoaidar Raion

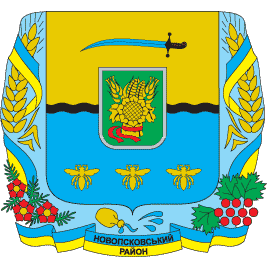
Novopskov Raion

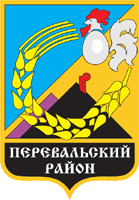
Perevalsk Raion

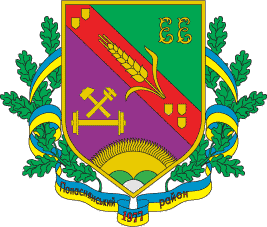
Popasna Raion

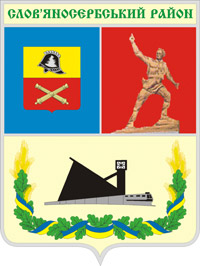
Slovianoserbsk Raion

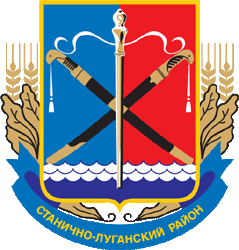
Stanytsia-Luhanska Raion

Starobilsk Raion

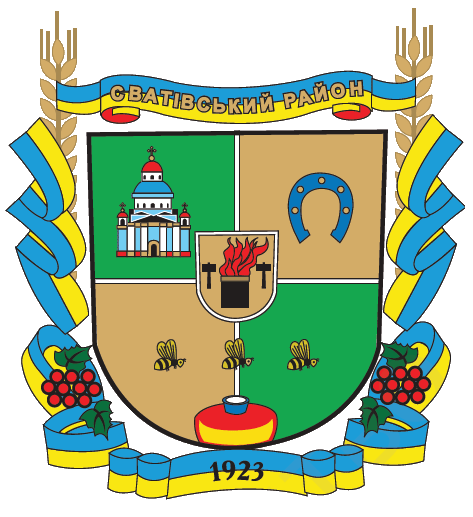
Svatove Raion

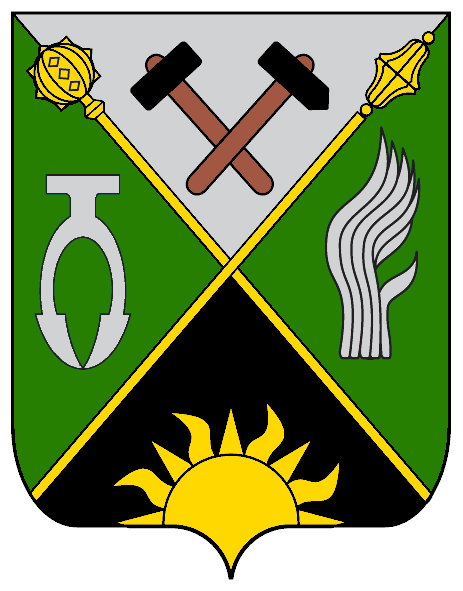
Sverdlovsk Raion

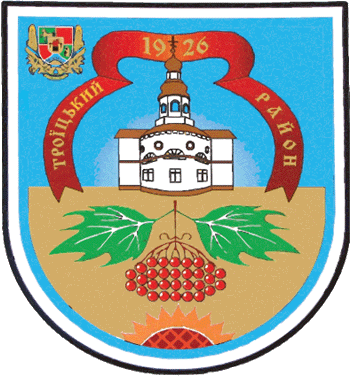
Troitske Raion

=== Lviv Oblast ===
Lviv

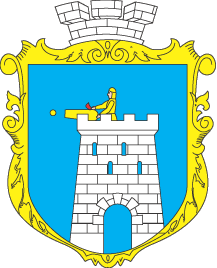
Belz

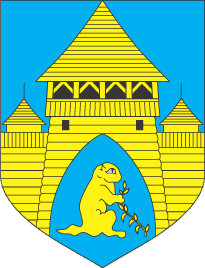
Bibrka

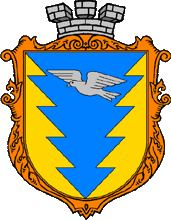
Borynia

Boryslav

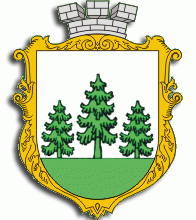
Briukhovychi

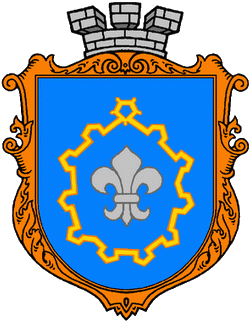
Brody

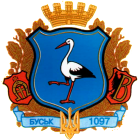
Busk

Chervonohrad

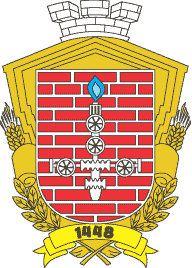
Dashava

Drohobych

Dobromyl

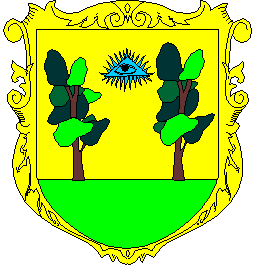
Dubliany

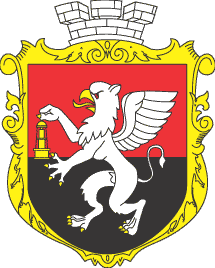
Hirnyk

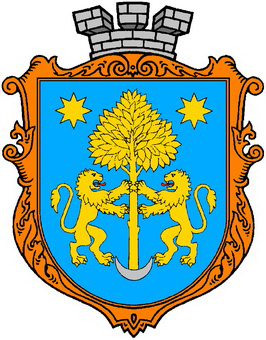
Hlyniany

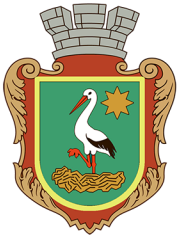
Hnizdychiv

Horodok

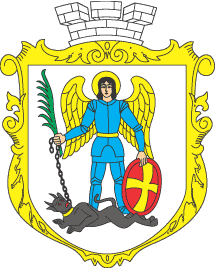
Ivano-Frankove

Kamianka-Buzka

Khodoriv

Khyriv

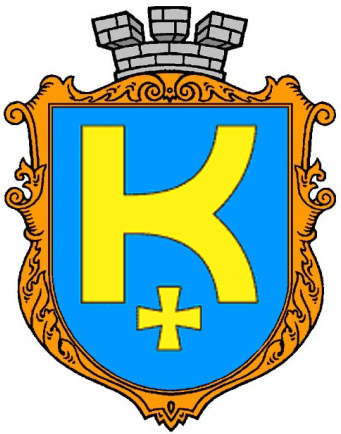
Komarno

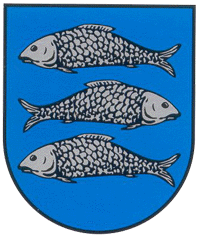
Krakovets

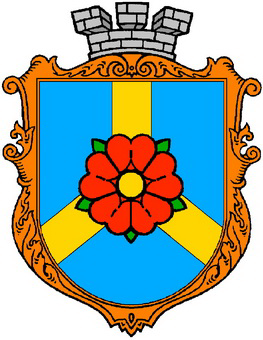
Krasne

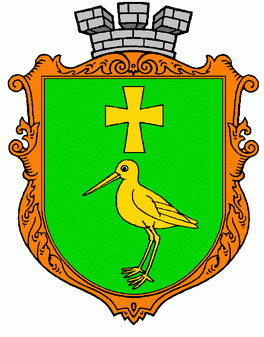
Kulykiv

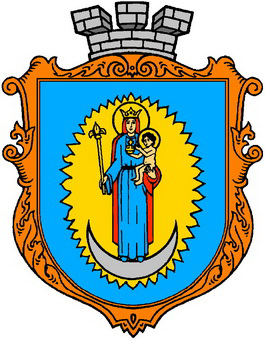
Lopatyn

Medenychi

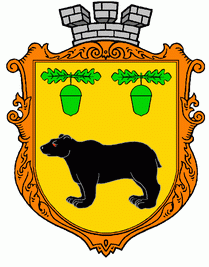
Maheriv

Morshyn

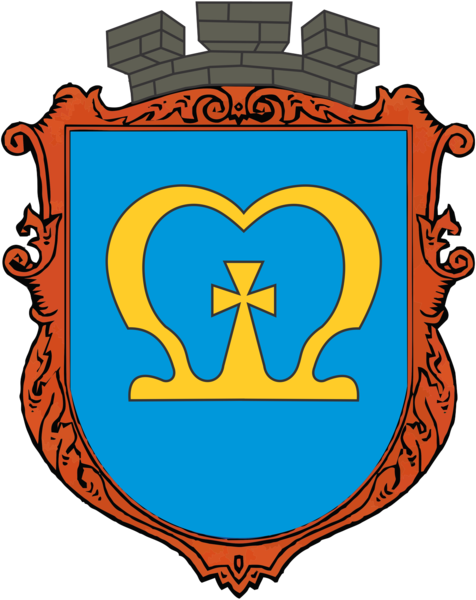
Mostyska

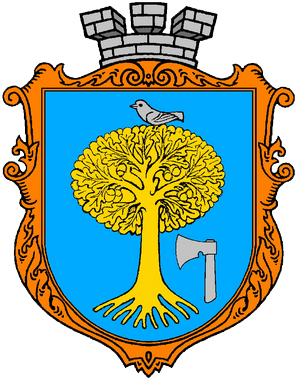
Mykolaiv

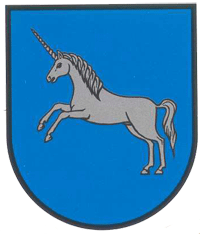
Nemyriv

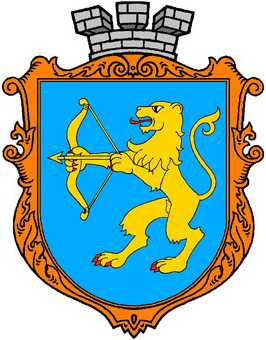
Novi Strilyshcha

Novoiavorivsk

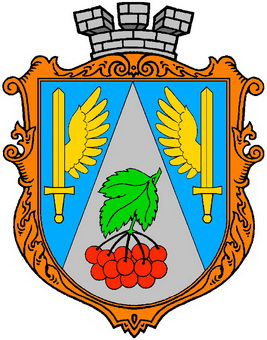
Novyi Kalyniv

Novyi Rozdil

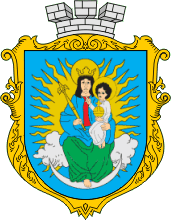
Novyi Yarychiv

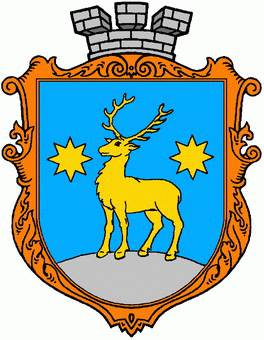
Nyzhankovychi

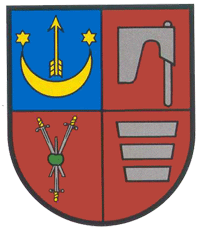
Olesko

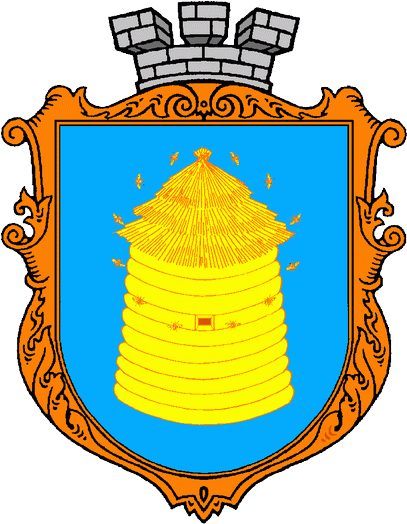
Peremyshliany

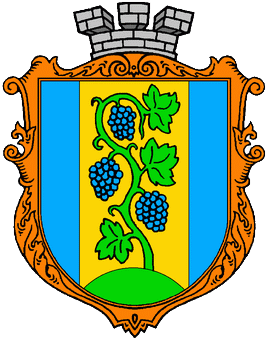
Pidbuzh

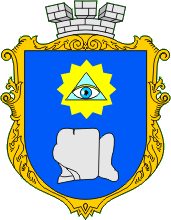
Pidkamin

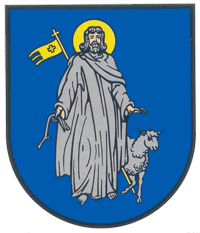
Pomoriany

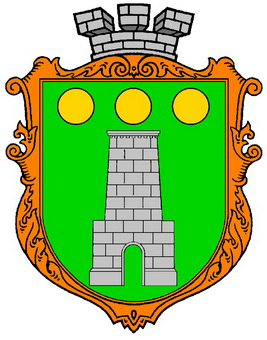
Pustomyty

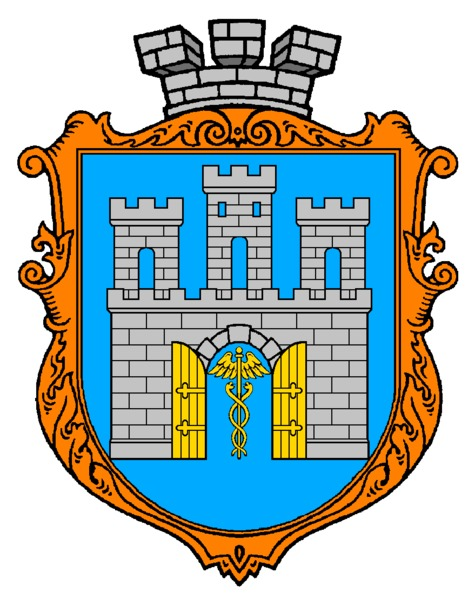
Rava-Ruska

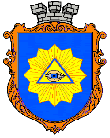
Radekhiv

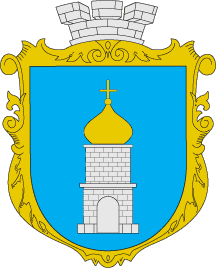
Rudky

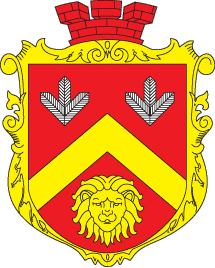
Rudne

Sambir

Shchyrets

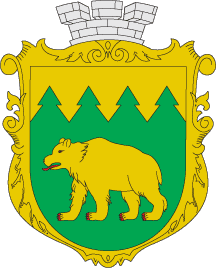
Skhidnytsia

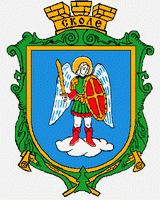
Skole

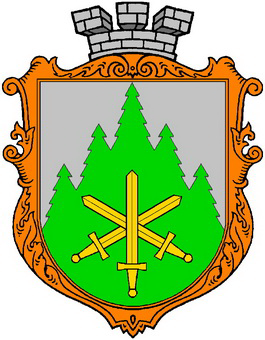
Slavske

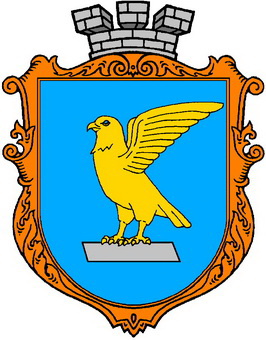
Sokal

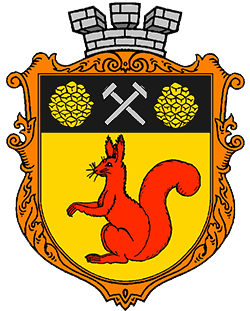
Sosnivka

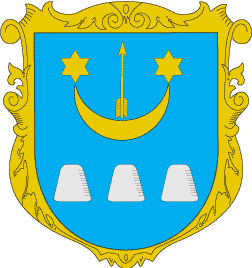
Stara Sil

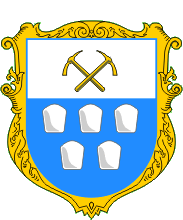
Stebnyk

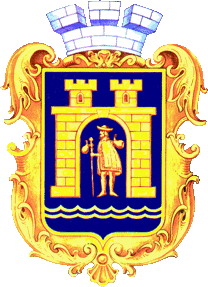
Stryi

Staryi Sambir

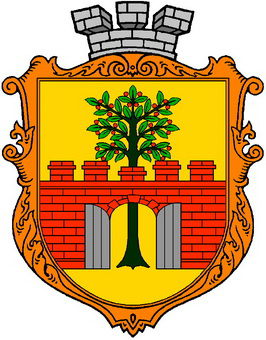
Sudova Vyshnia

Truskavets

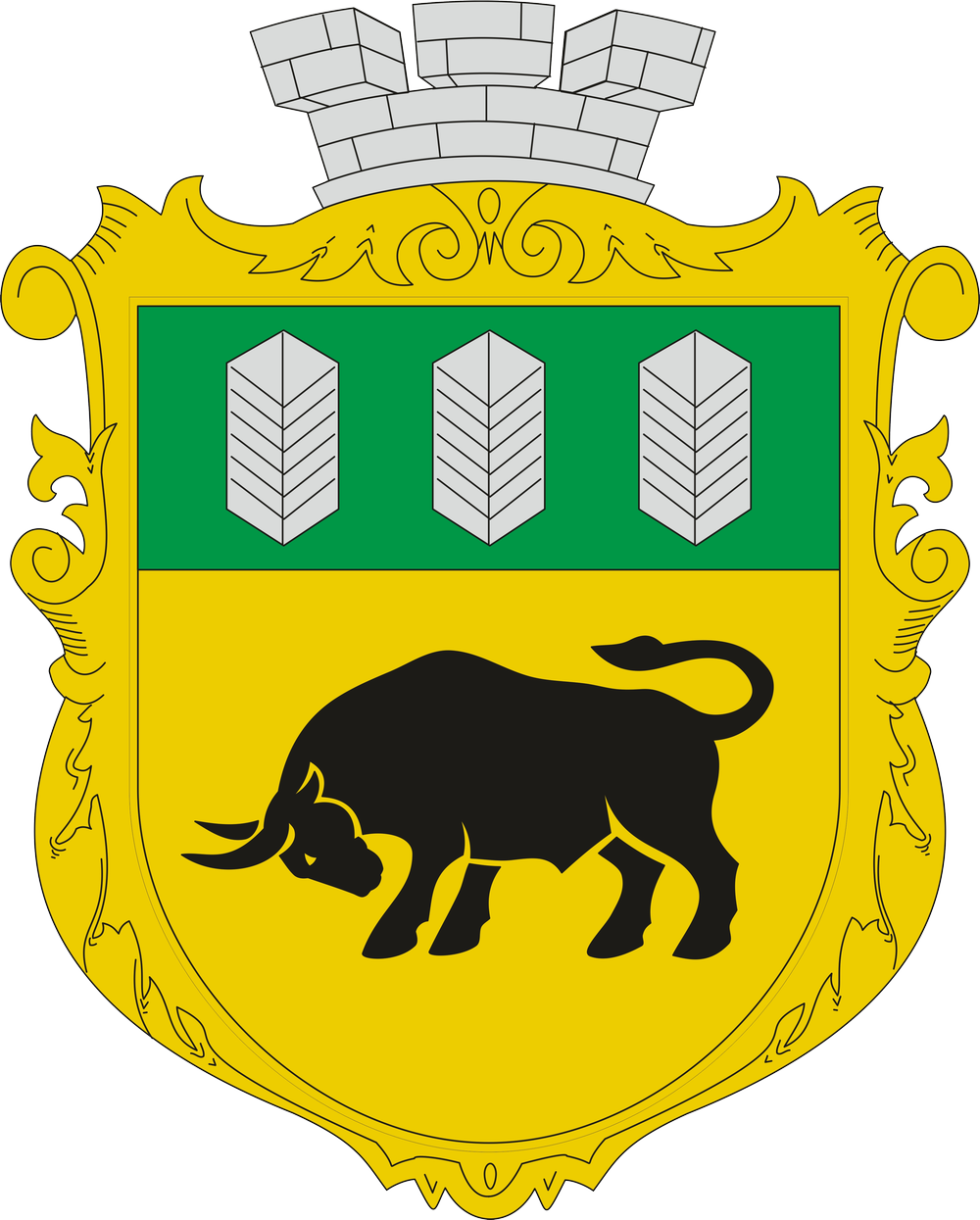
Turka

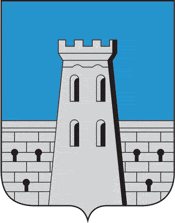
Uhniv

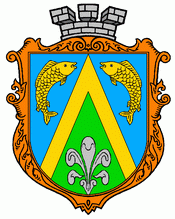
Velykyi Liubin

Velyki Mosty

Vynnyky

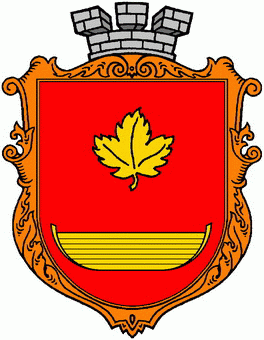
Yavoriv

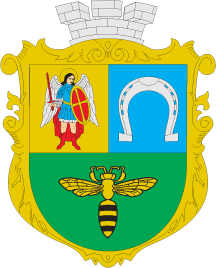
Zapytiv

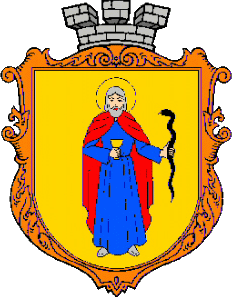
Zhovkva

Zhvyrka

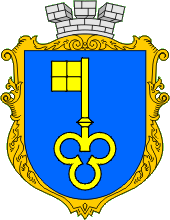
Zhuravne

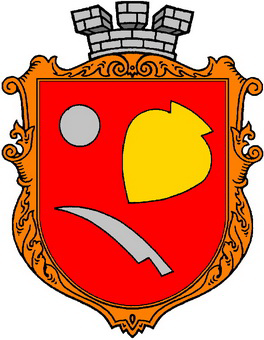
Zhydachiv

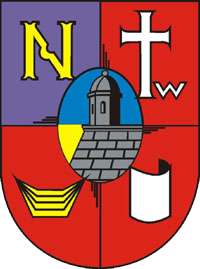
Zolochiv

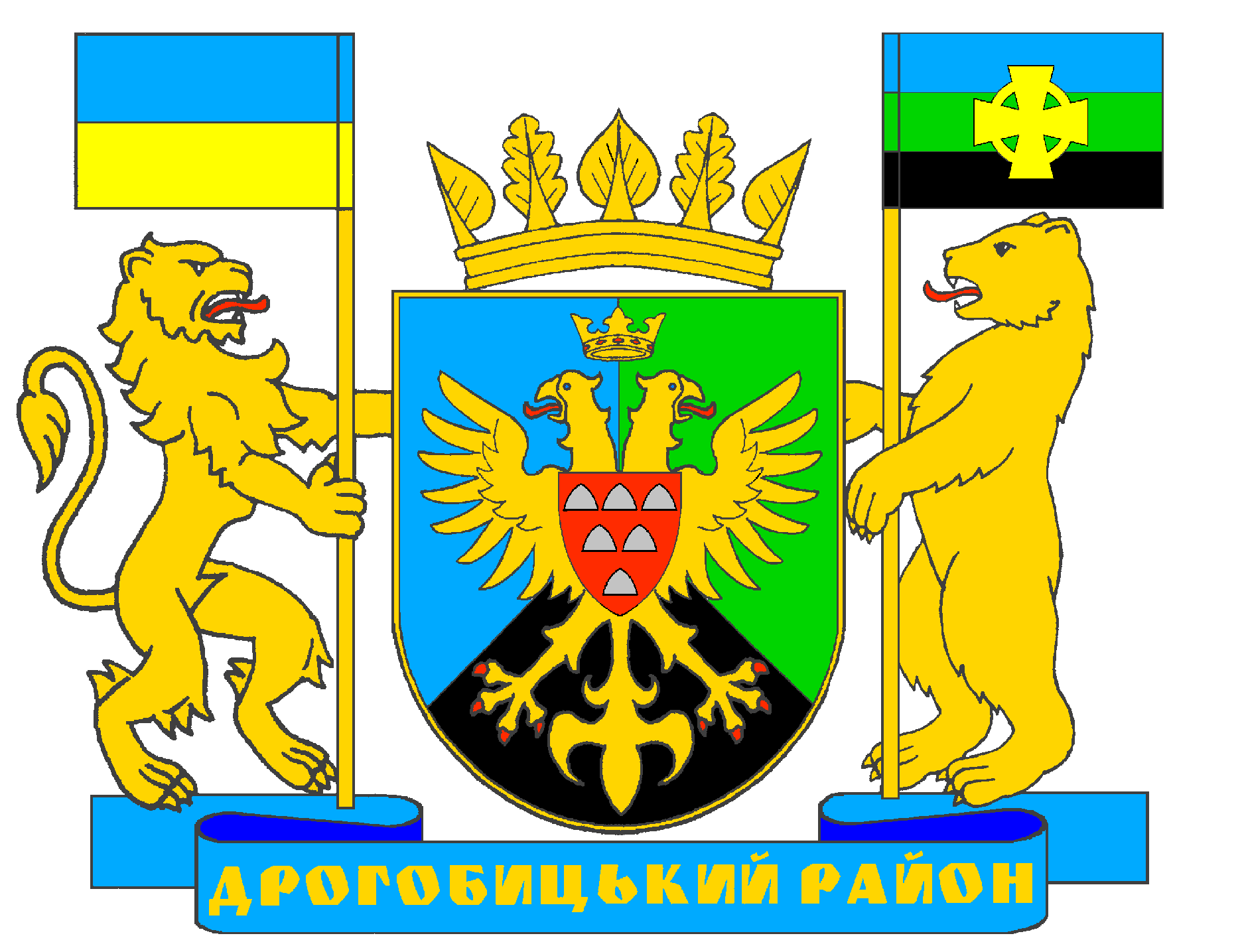
Drohobych Raion

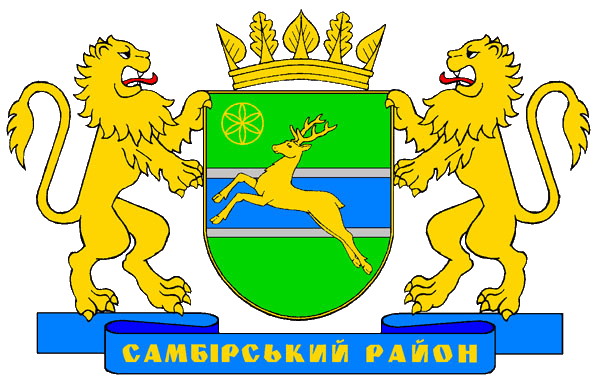
Sambir Raion

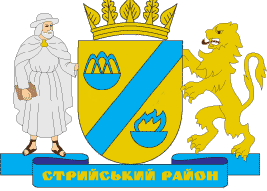
Stryi Raion

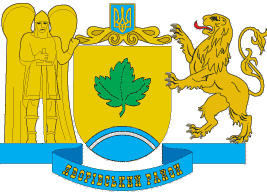
Yavoriv Raion

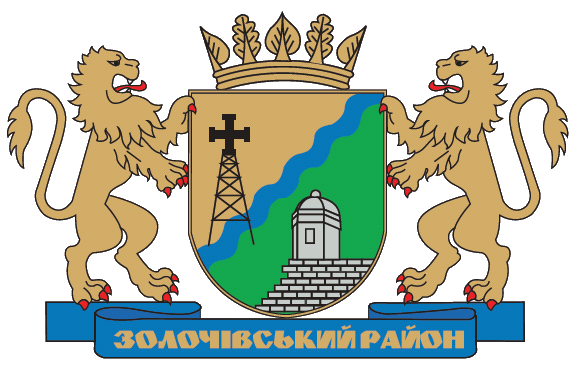
Zolochiv Raion, Lviv Oblast

=== Mykolaiv Oblast ===
Mykolaiv

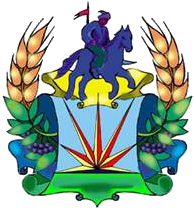
Arbuzynka

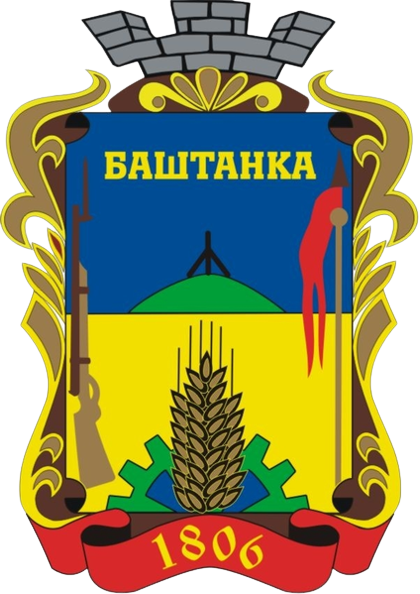
Bashtanka

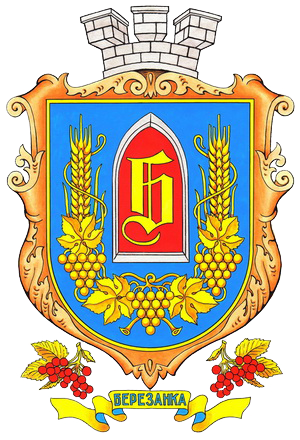
Berezanka

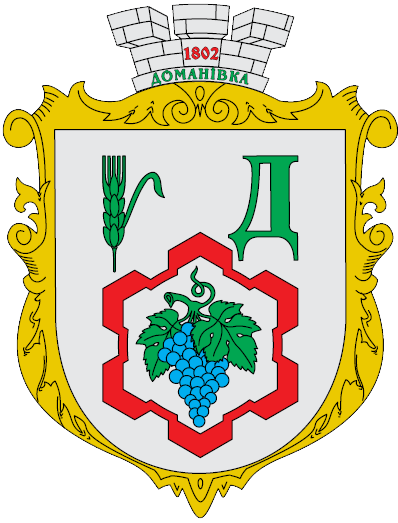
Domanivka

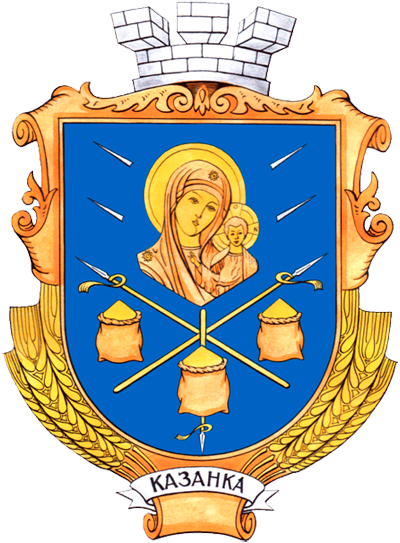
Kazanka

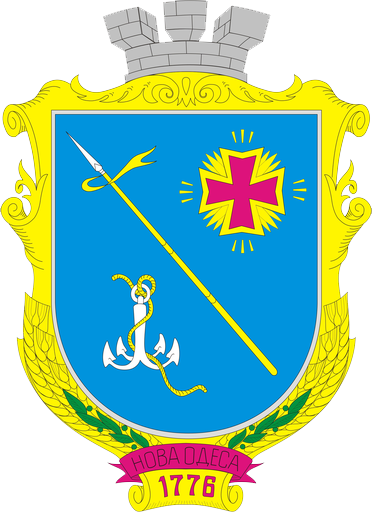
Nova Odesa

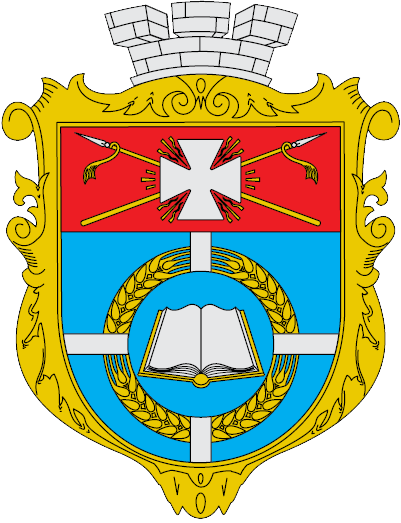
Novyi Buh

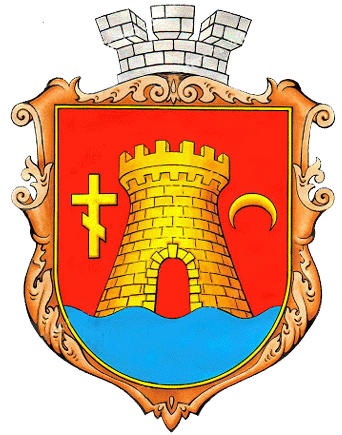
Ochakiv

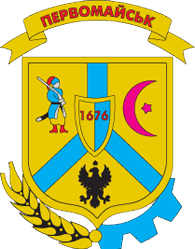
Pervomaisk

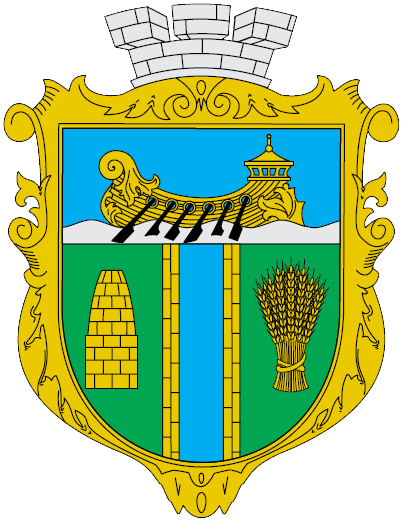
Snihurivka

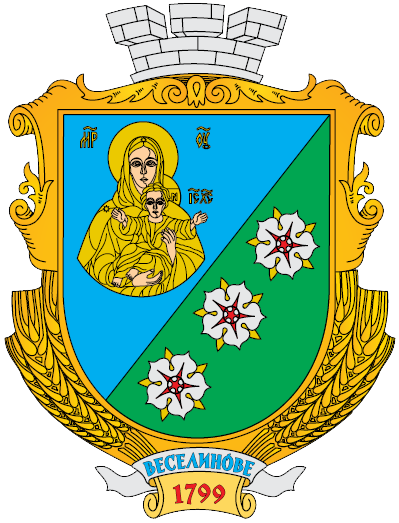
Veselynove

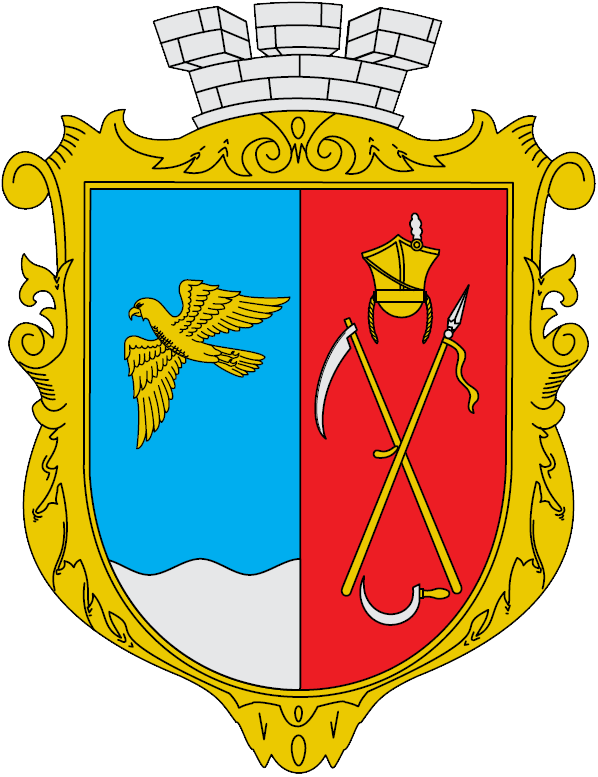
Voznesensk

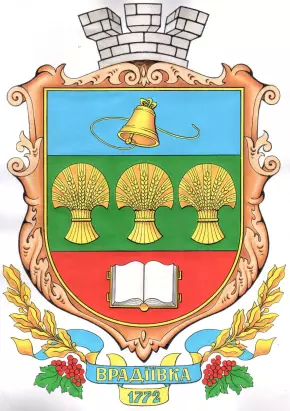
Vradiivka

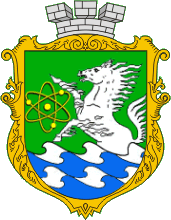
Yuzhnoukrainsk

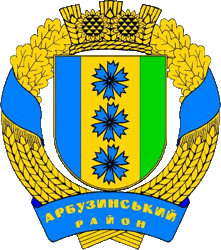
Arbuzynka Raion

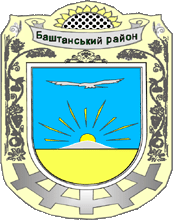
Bashtanka Raion

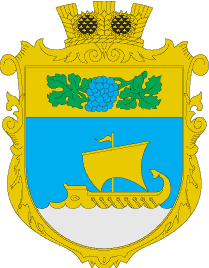
Berezanka Raion

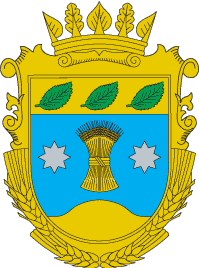
Bereznehuvate Raion

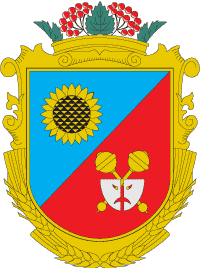
Bratske Raion

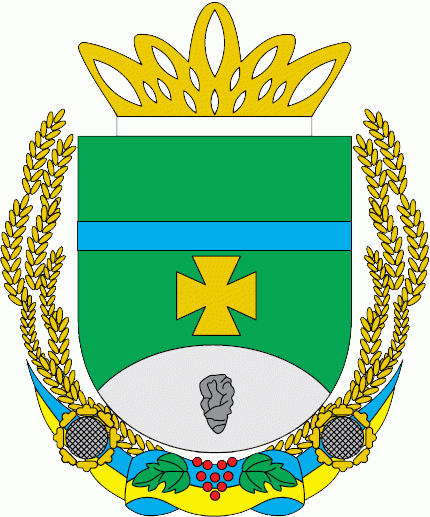
Domanivka Raion

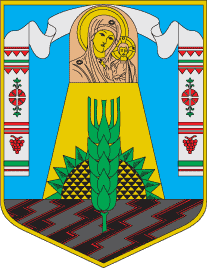
Kazanka Raion

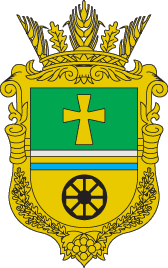
Kryve Ozero Raion

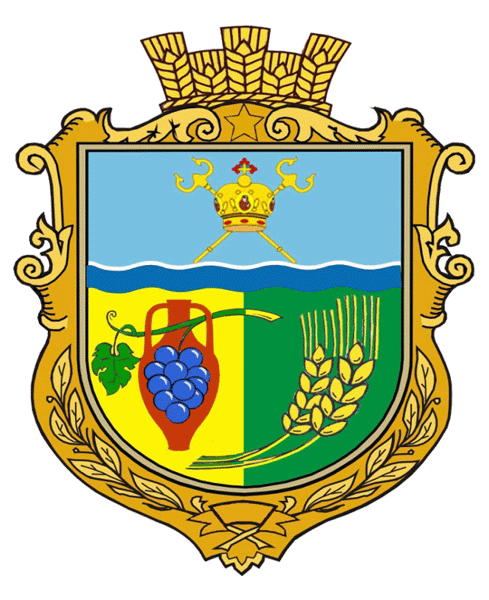
Mykolaiv Raion (2012)

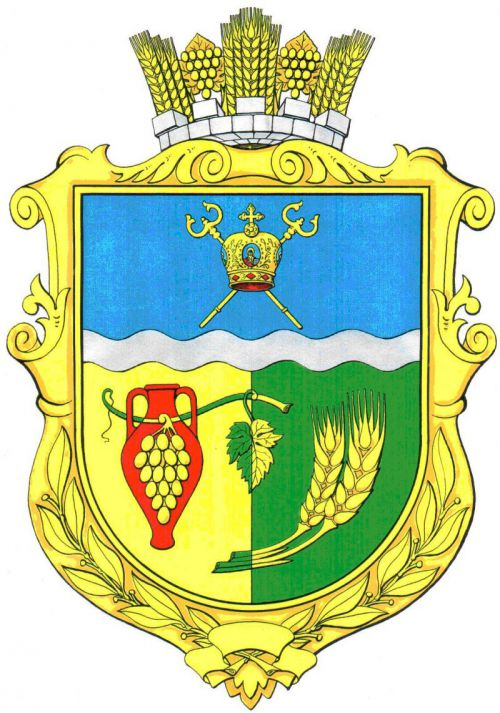
Mykolaiv Raion (2012–present)

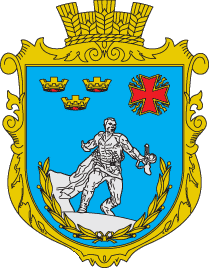
Nova Odesa Raion

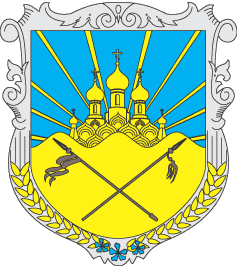
Novyi Buh Raion

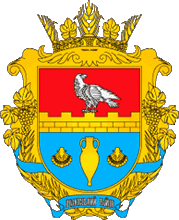
Ochakiv Raion

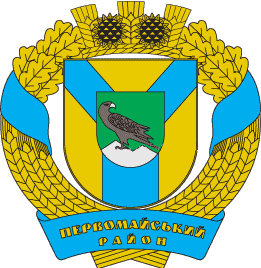
Pervomaisk Raion

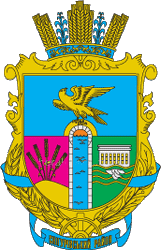
Snihurivka Raion

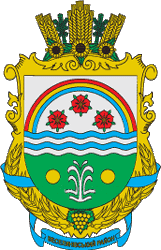
Veselynove Raion

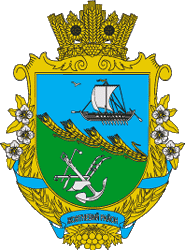
Vitovka Raion (2012–2017)

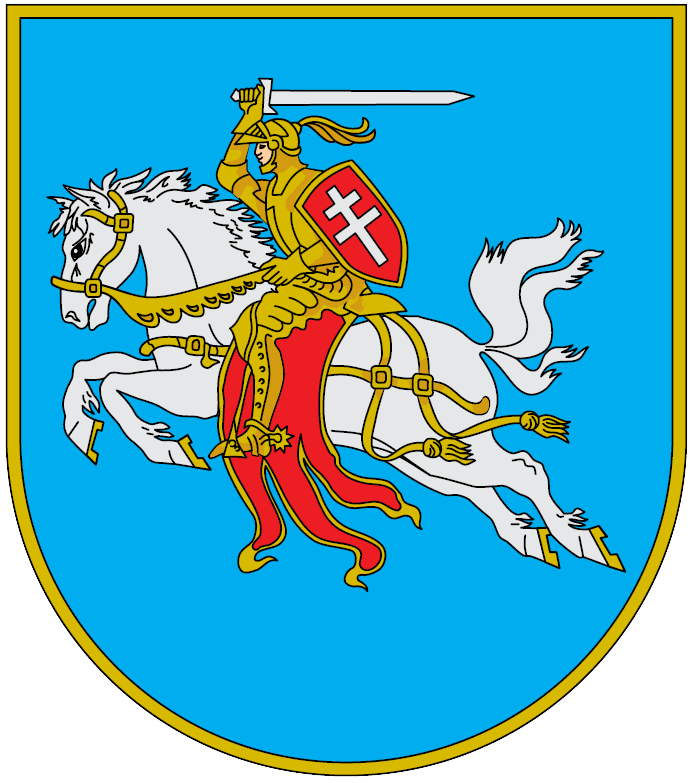
Vitovka Raion (2017–2020)

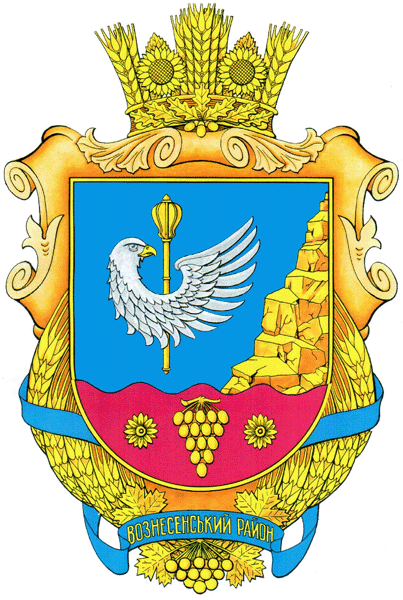
Voznesensk Raion

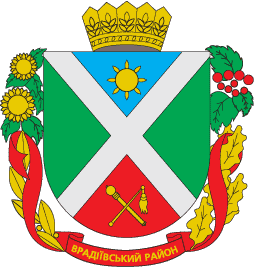
Vradiivka Raion

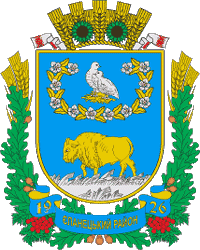
Yelanets Raion

=== Odesa Oblast ===
Odesa

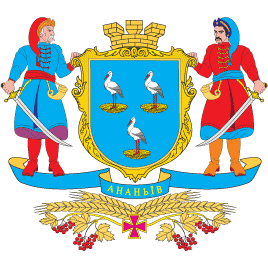
Ananiv

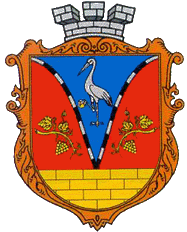
Artsyz

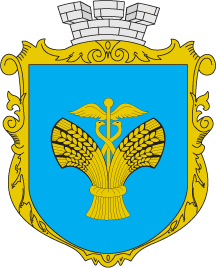
Balta

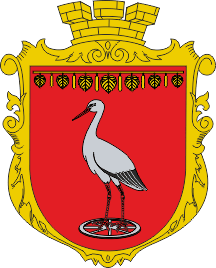
Berezivka

Bilhorod-Dnistrovskyi

Biliaivka

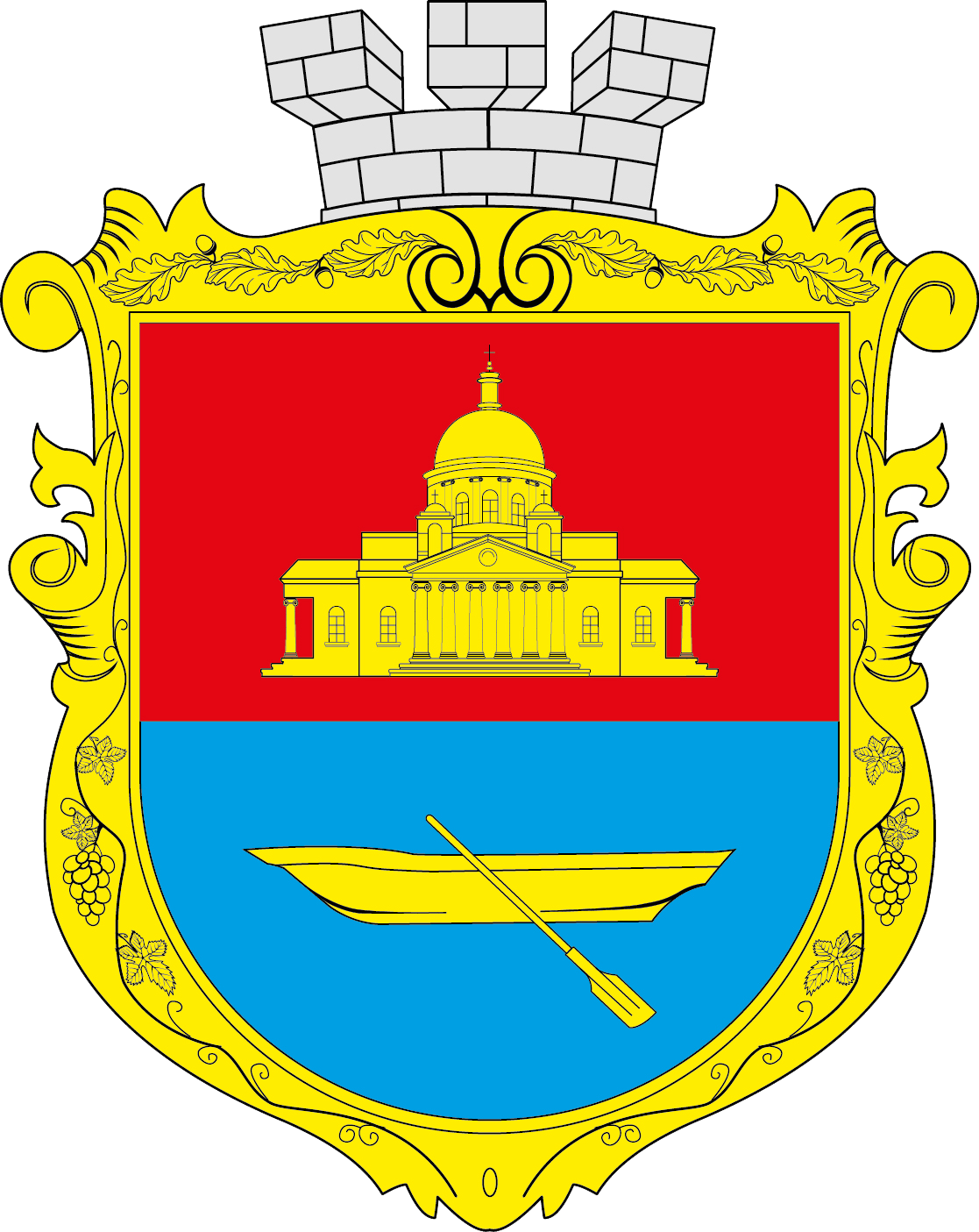
Bolhrad

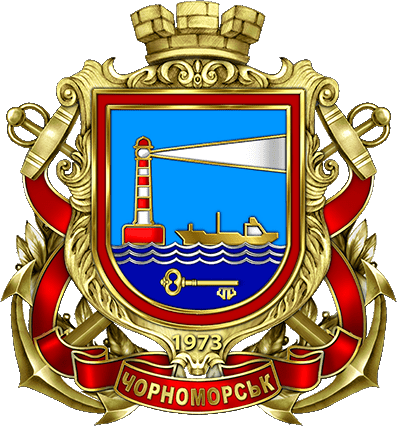
Chornomorsk

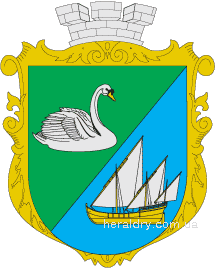
Chornomorske

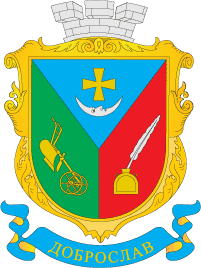
Dobroslav

Izmail

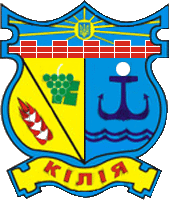
Kiliia

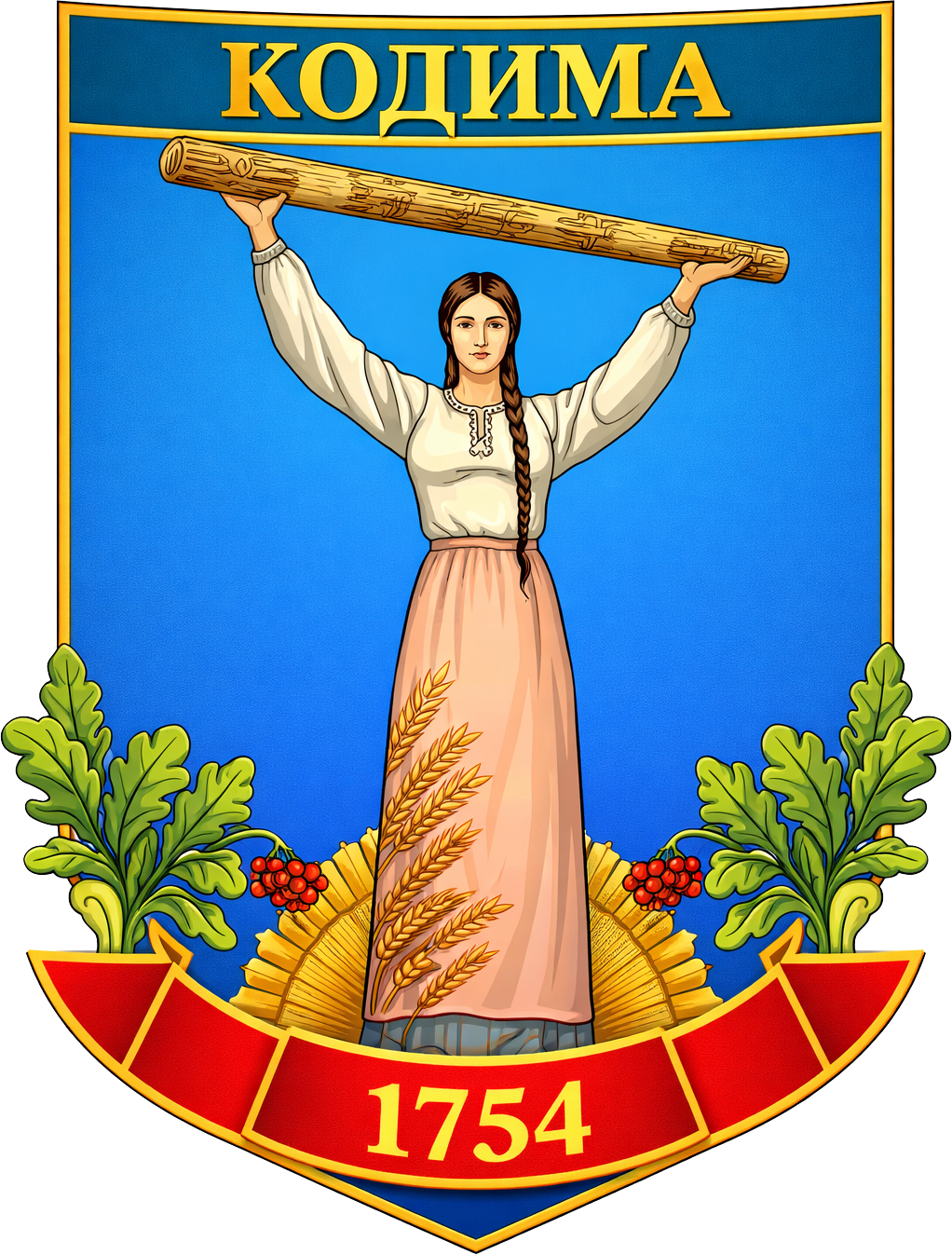
Kodyma

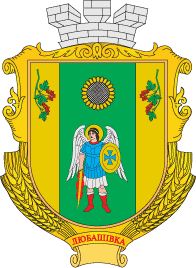
Liubashivka

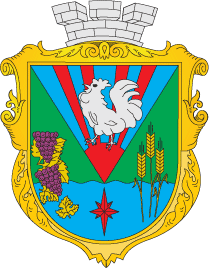
Lymanske

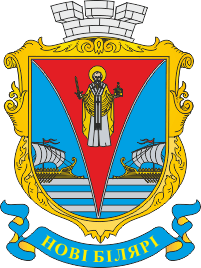
Novi Biliari

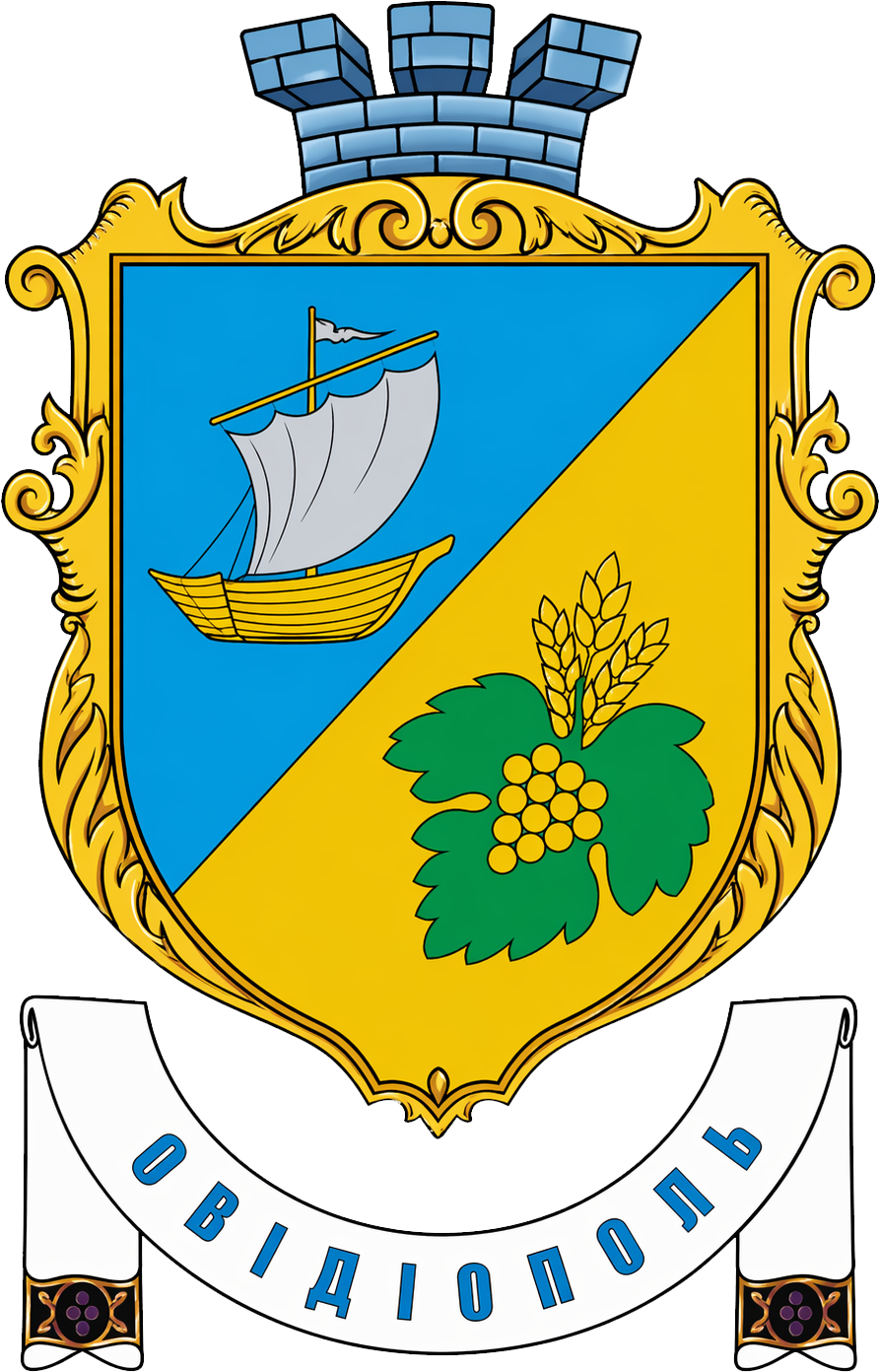
Ovidiopol

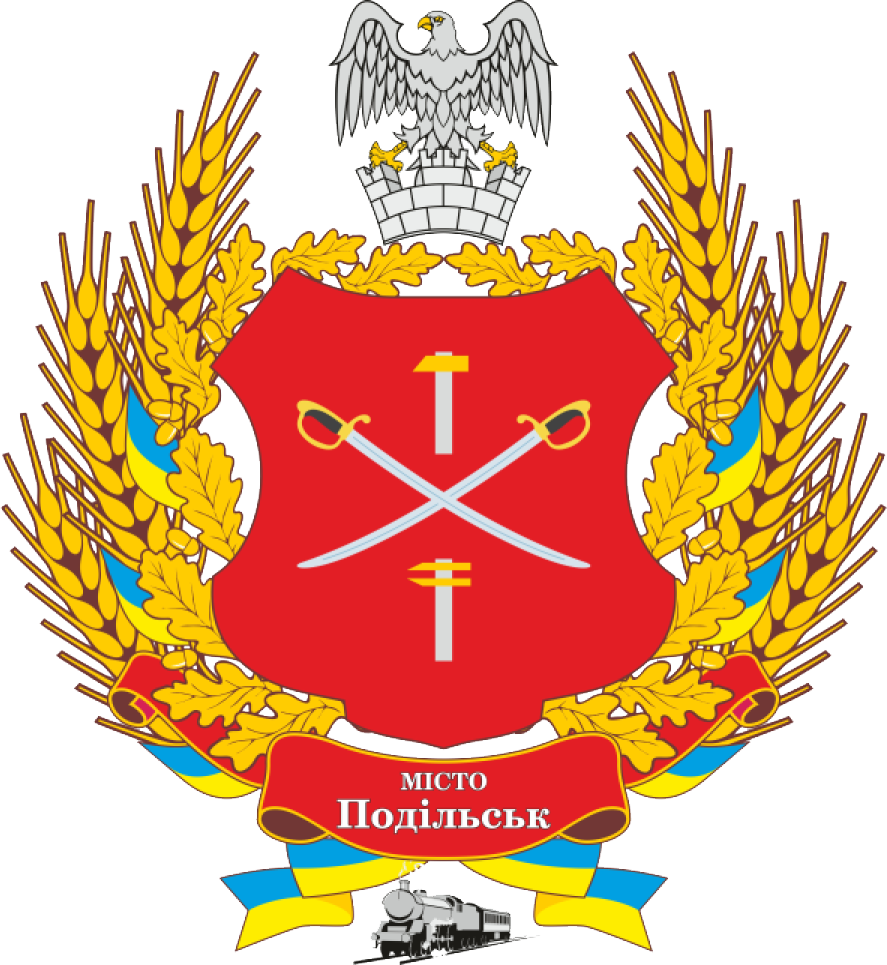
Podilsk

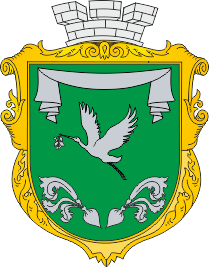
Radisne

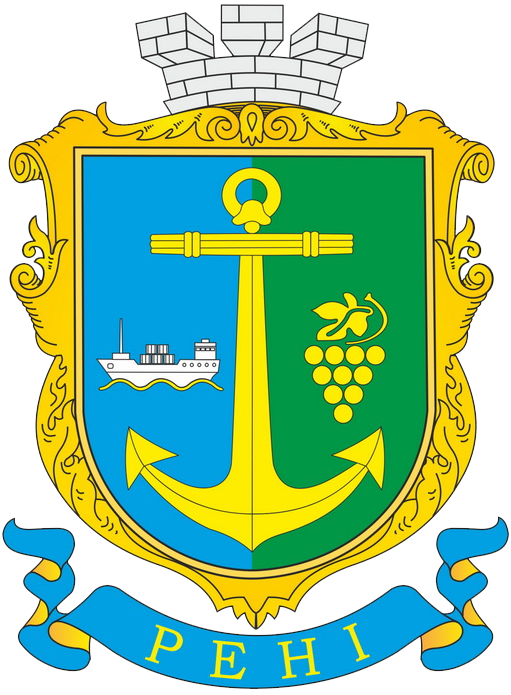
Reni

Rozdilna

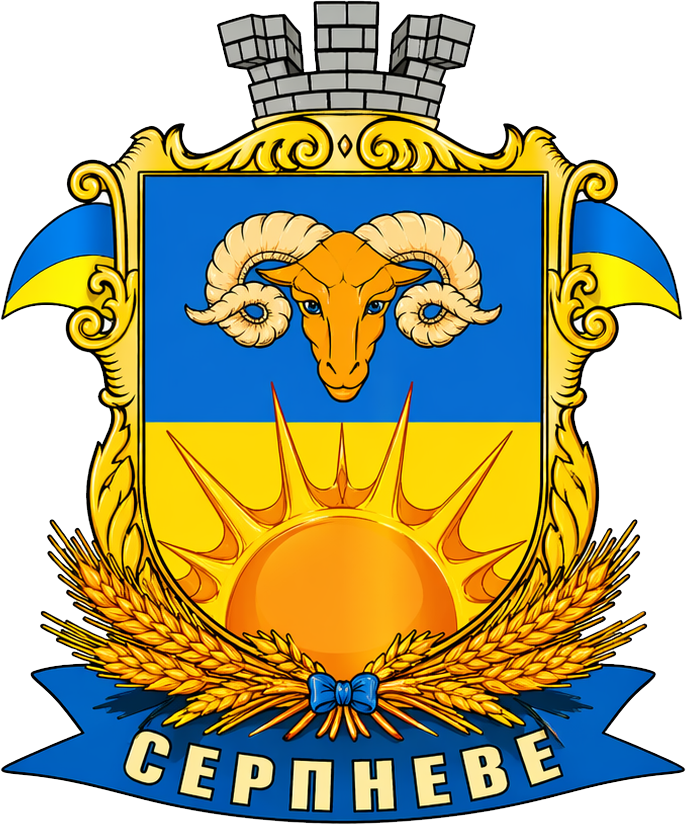
Serpneve

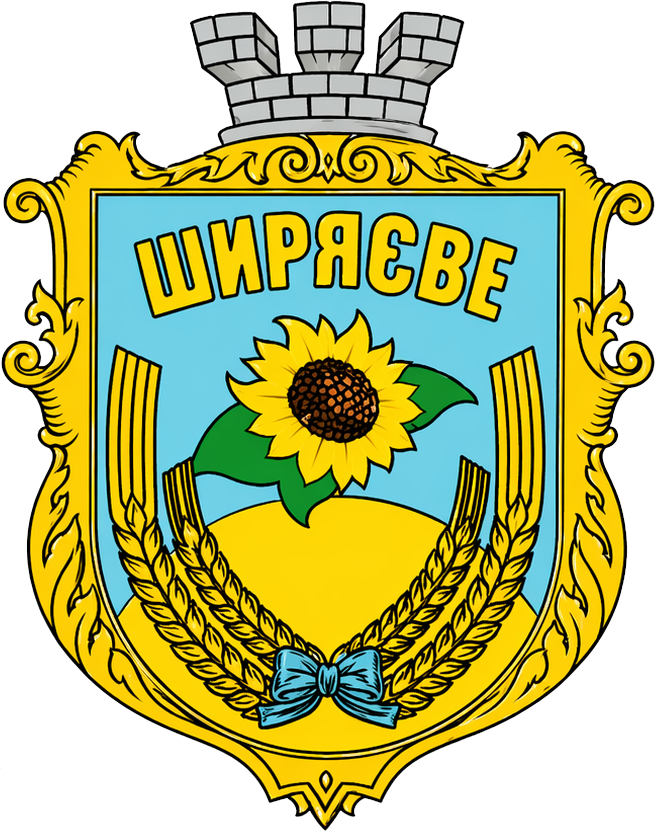
Shyriaieve

Tatarbunary

Teplodar

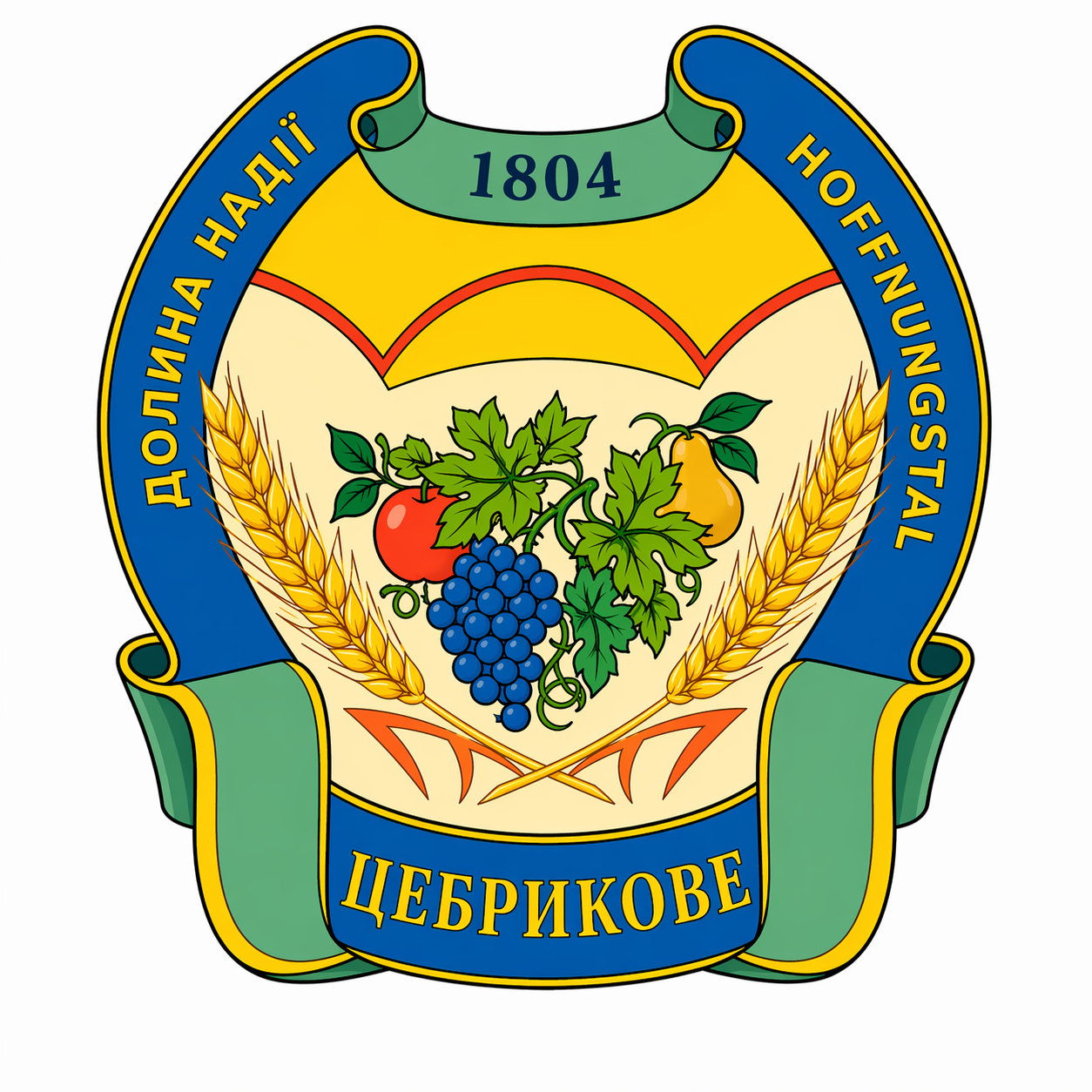
Tsebrykove

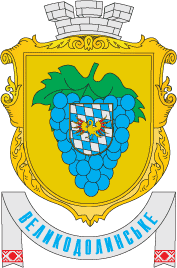
Velykodolynske

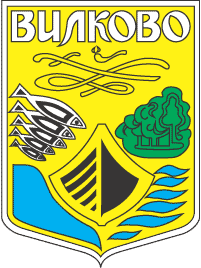
Vylkove

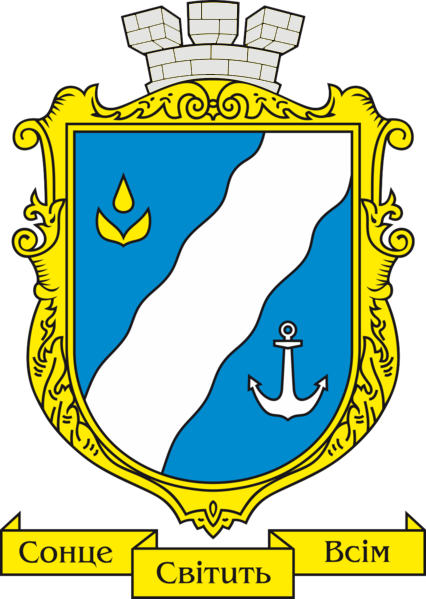
Yuzhne

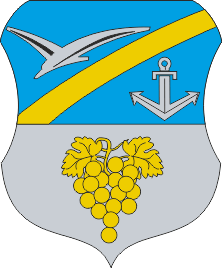
Zatoka

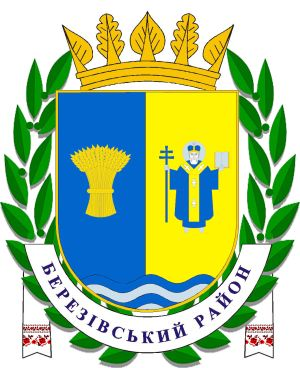
Berezivka Raion

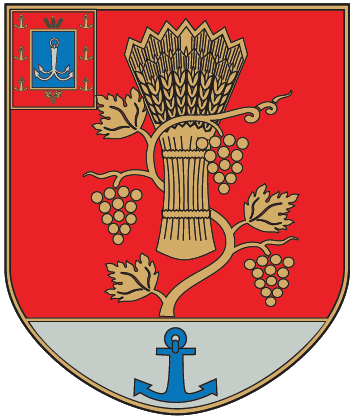
Bilhorod-Dnistrovskyi Raion

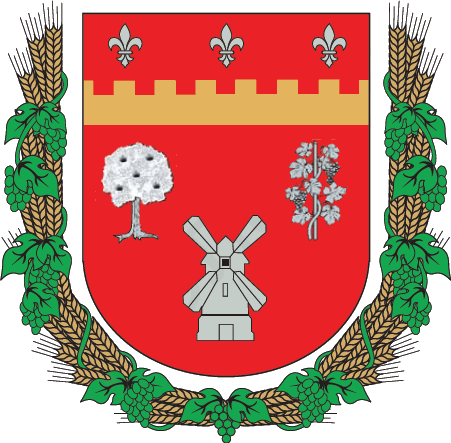
Bolhrad Raion

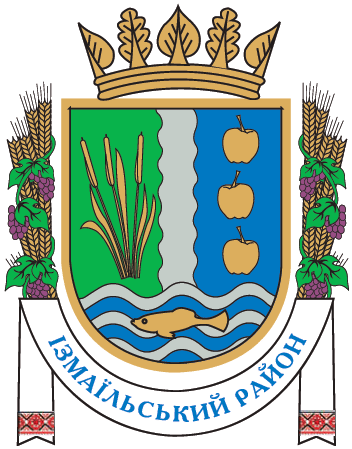
Izmail Raion

Odesa Raion

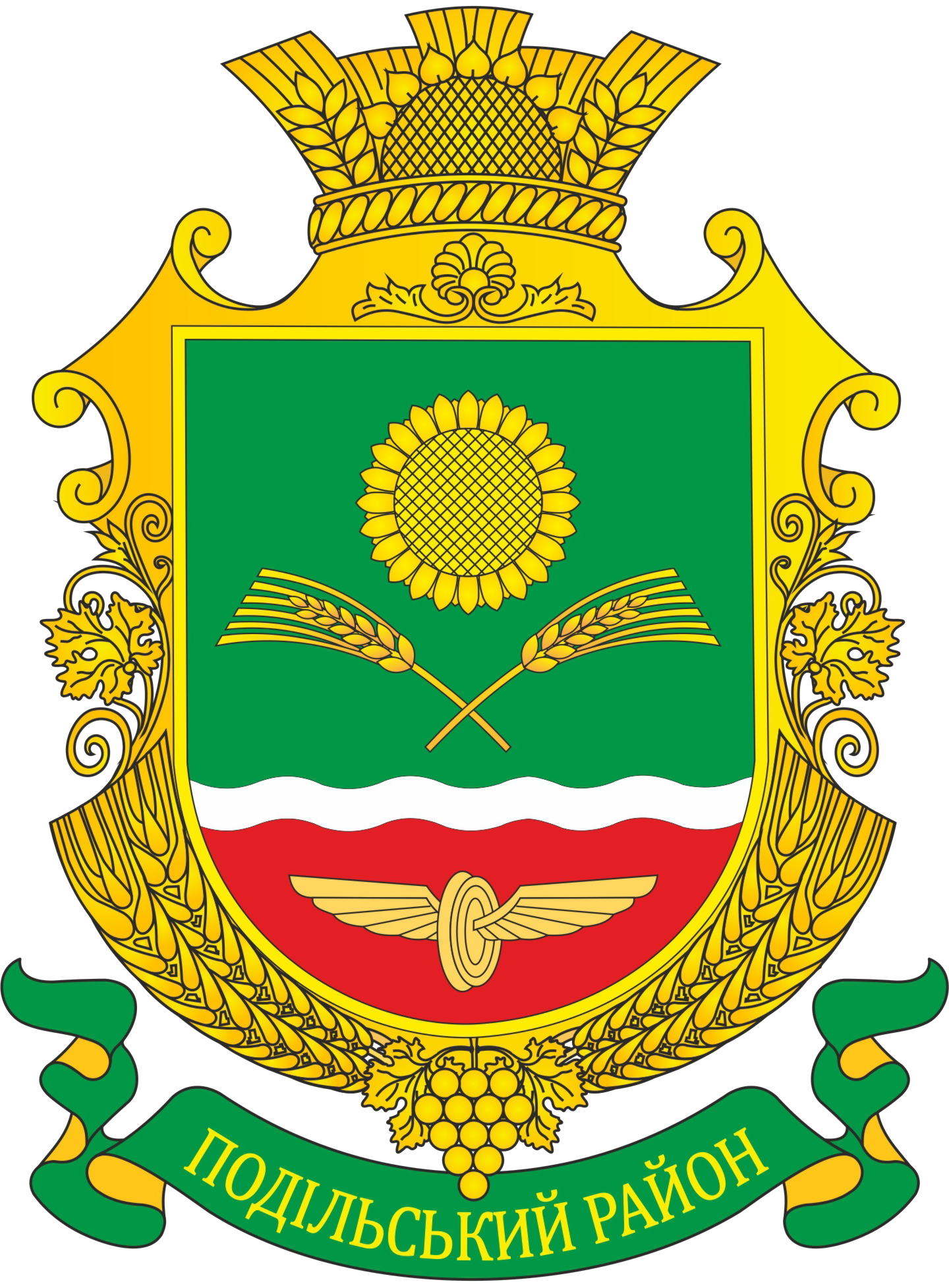
Podilsk Raion

Rozdilna Raion

=== Poltava Oblast ===
Poltava

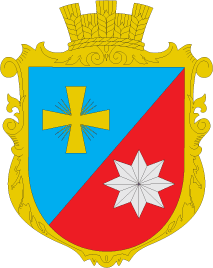
Bilyky

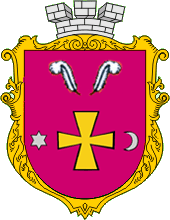
Chornukhy

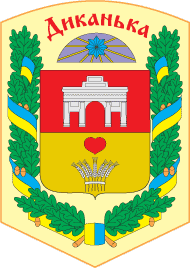
Dykanka

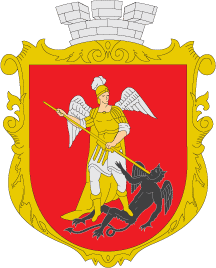
Hadiach

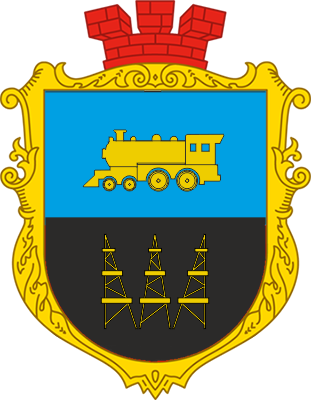
Hoholeve

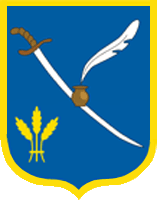
Hlobyne

Horishni Plavni

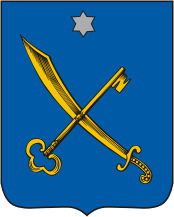
Hradyzk

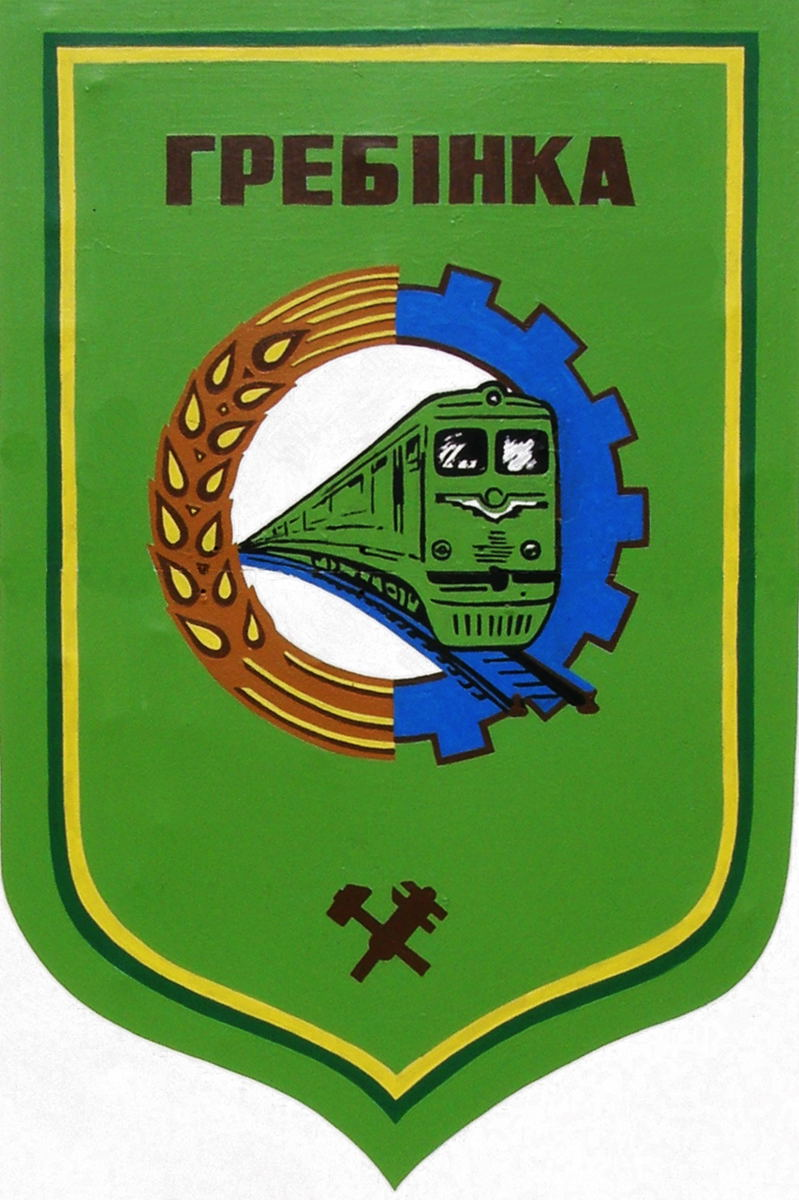
Hrebinka

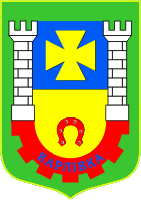
Karlivka

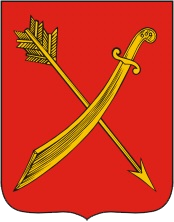
Khorol

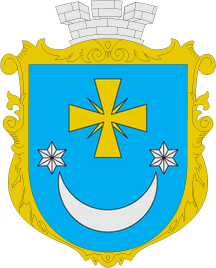
Komyshnia

Kremenchuk

Kobeliaky

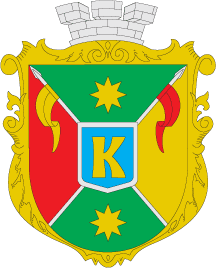
Kotelva

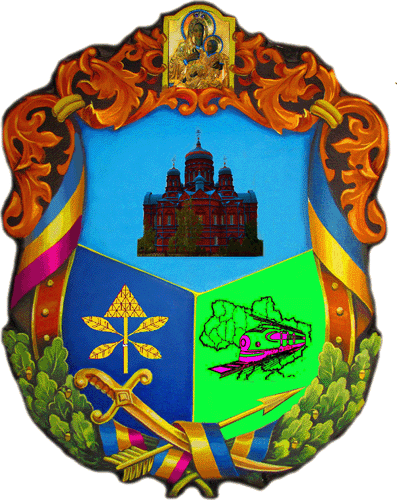
Kozelshchyna

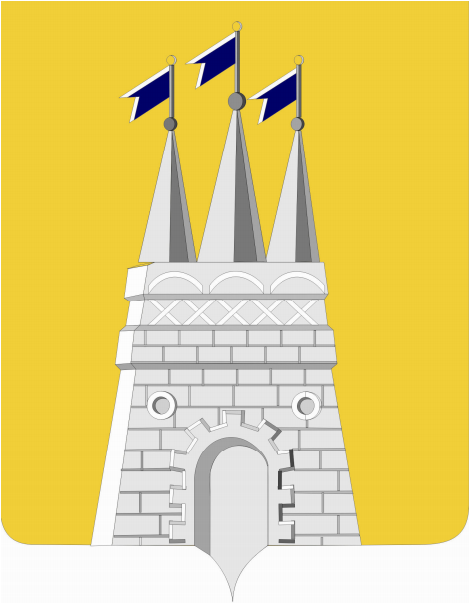
Lokhvytsia

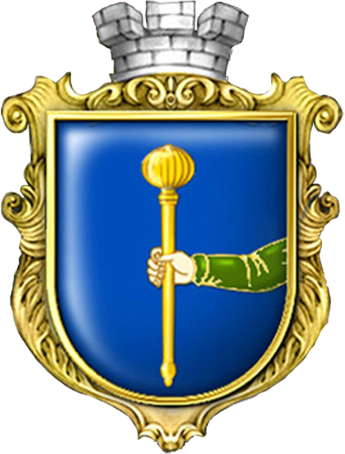
Lubny

Myrhorod

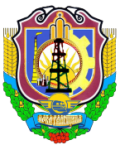
Nova Haleshchyna

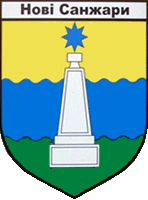
Novi Sanzhary

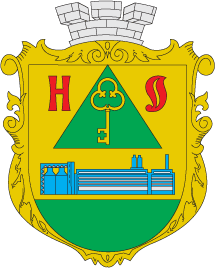
Novoorzhytske

Opishnia

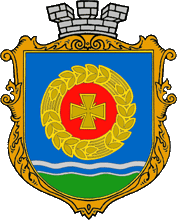
Orzhytsia

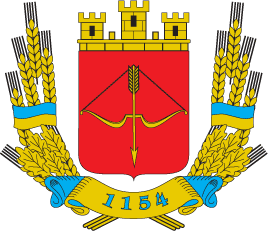
Pyriatyn

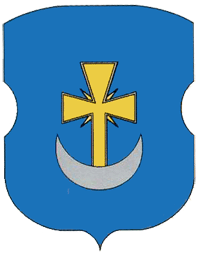
Reshetylivka

Semenivka

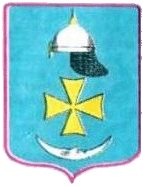
Shyshaky

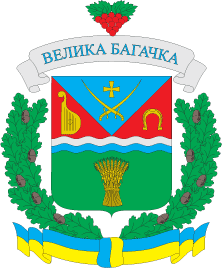
Velyka Bahachka

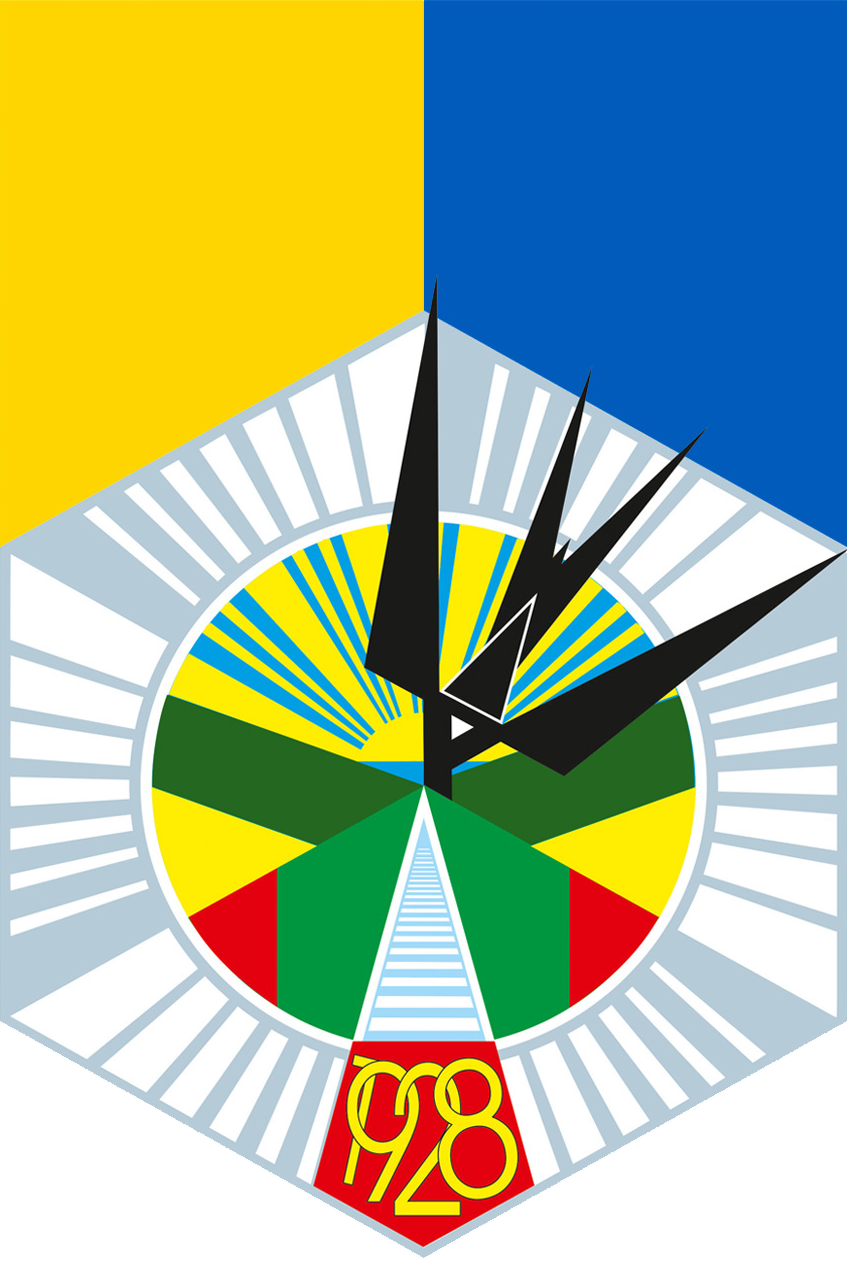
Zavodske

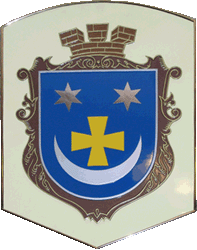
Zinkiv

Chornukhy Raion

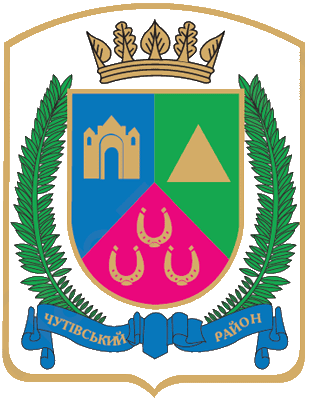
Chutove Raion

Dykanka Raion

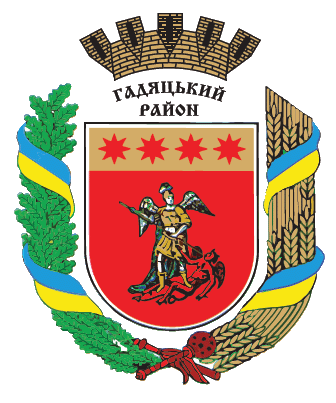
Hadiach Raion

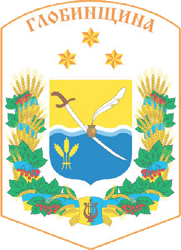
Hlobyne Raion

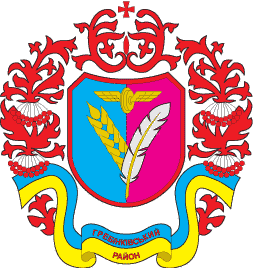
Hrebinka Raion

Karlivka Raion

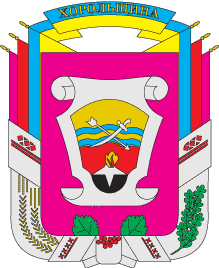
Khorol Raion

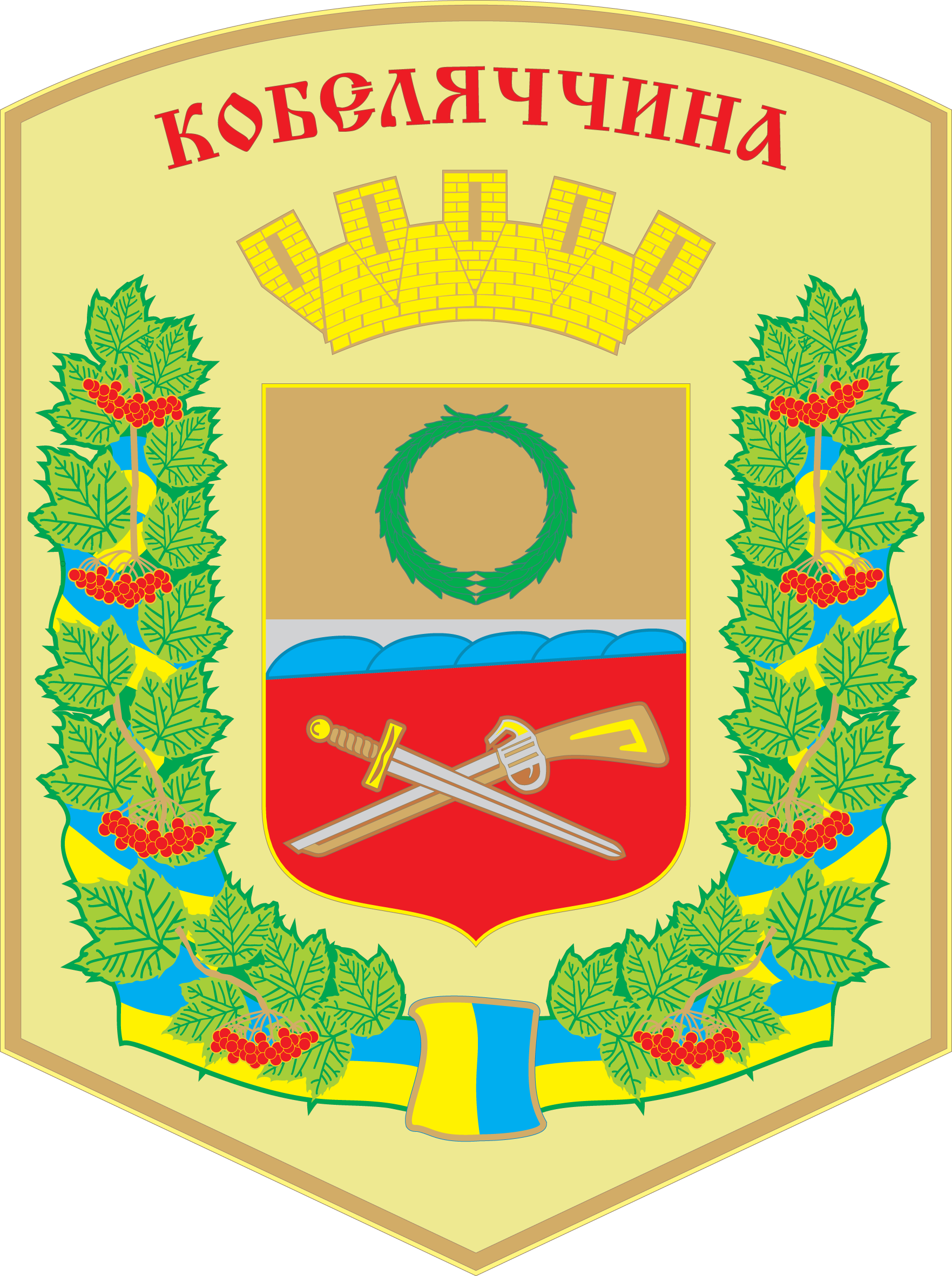
Kobeliaky Raion

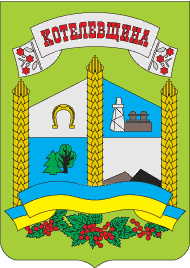
Kotelva Raion

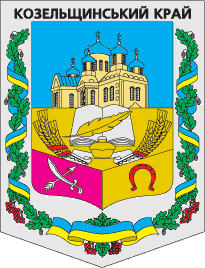
Kozelshchyna Raion

Kremenchuk Raion

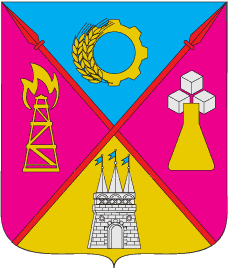
Lokhvytsia Raion

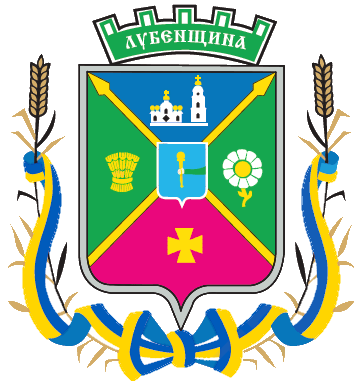
Lubny Raion

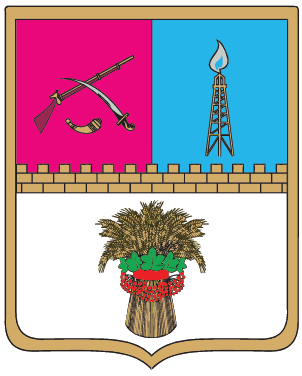
Mashivka Raion

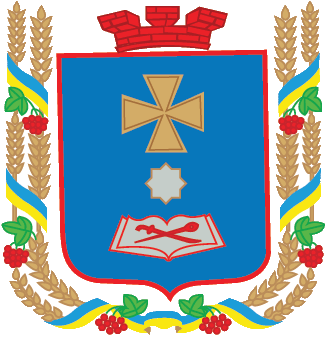
Myrhorod Raion

Novi Sanzhary Raion

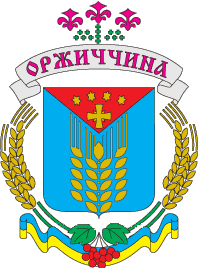
Orzhytsia Raion

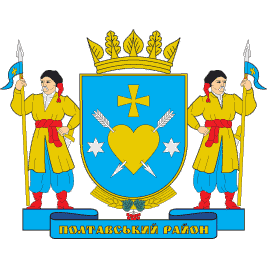
Poltava Raion

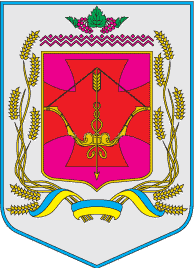
Pyriatyn Raion

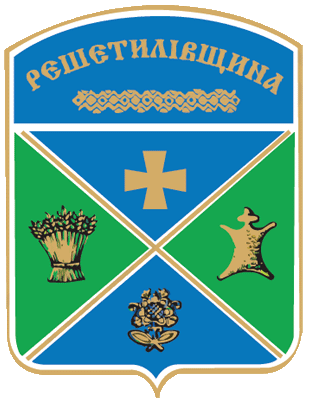
Reshetylivka Raion

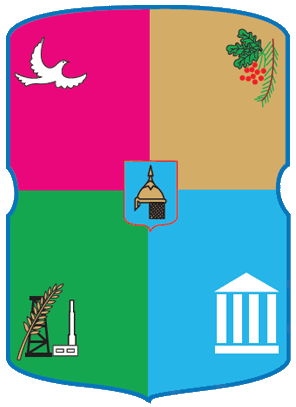
Shyshaky Raion

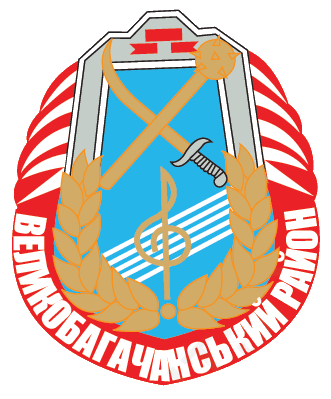
Velyka Bahachka Raion

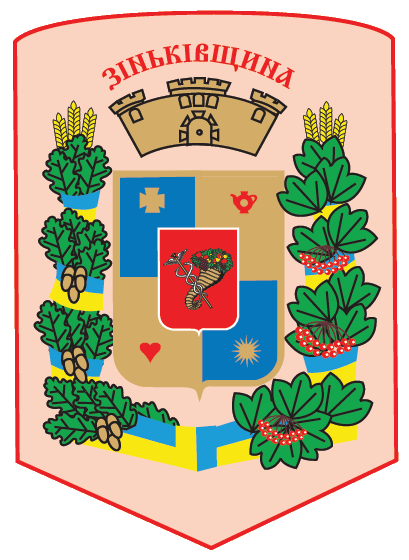
Zinkiv Raion

=== Rivne Oblast ===
Rivne

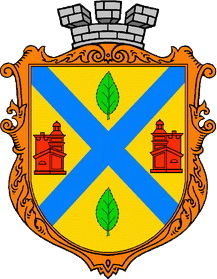
Berezne

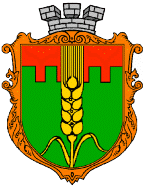
Demydivka

Dubno

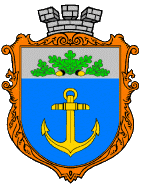
Dubrovytsia

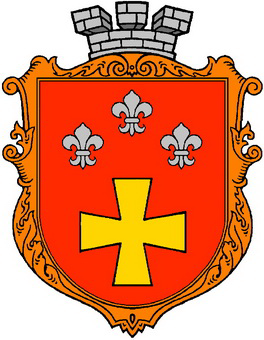
Hoshcha

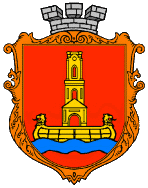
Korets

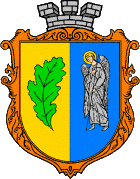
Kostopil

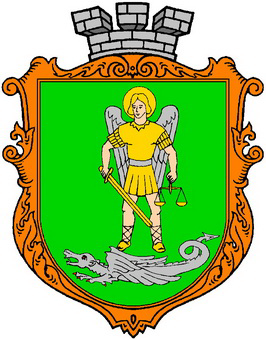
Klevan

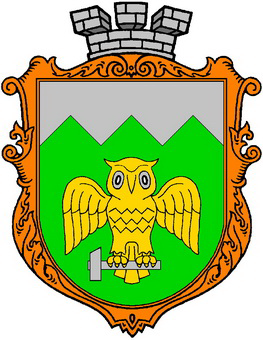
Klesiv

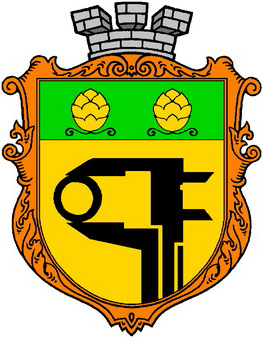
Kvasyliv

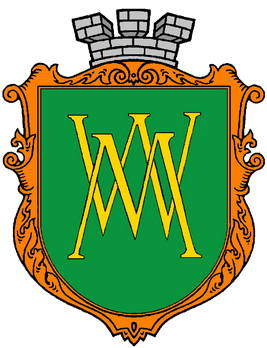
Mizoch

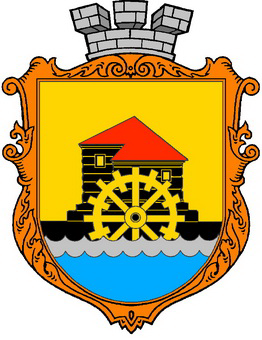
Mlyniv

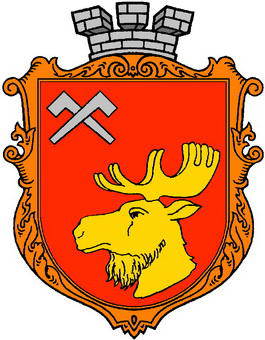
Rafalivka

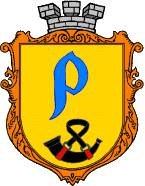
Radyvyliv

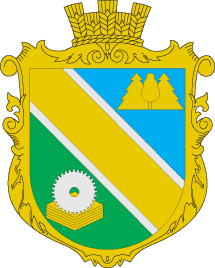
Orzhiv

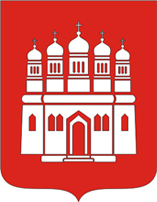
Ostroh

Rokytne

Sarny

Stepan

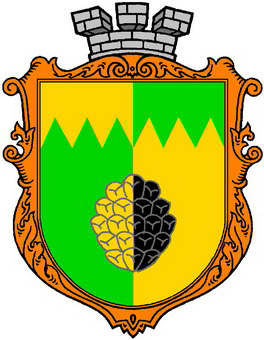
Sosnove

Varash

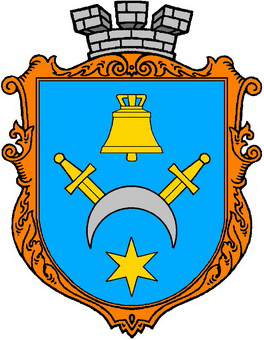
Volodymyrets

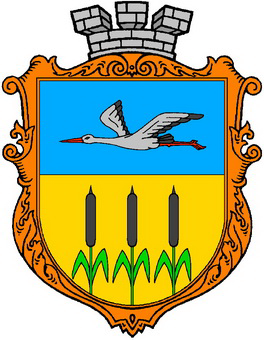
Zarichne

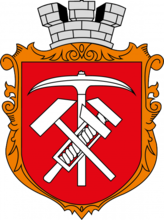
Zdolbuniv

Berezne Raion

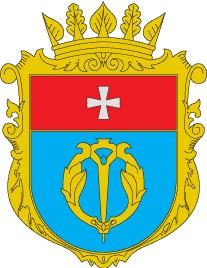
Demydivka Raion

Dubno Raion

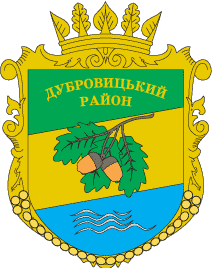
Dubrovytsia Raion

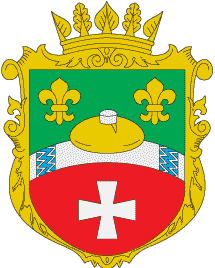
Hoshcha Raion

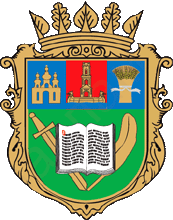
Korets Raion

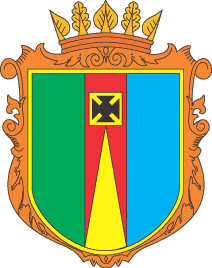
Kostopil Raion

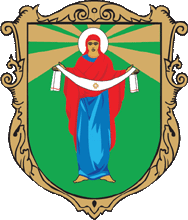
Mlyniv Raion

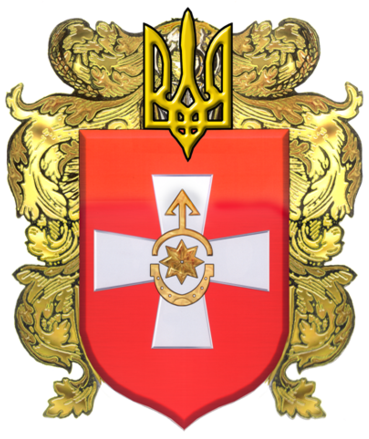
Ostroh Raion

Radyvyliv Raion

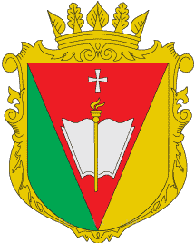
Rivne Raion

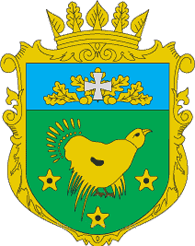
Rokytne Raion

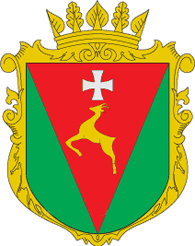
Sarny Raion

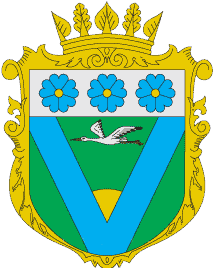
Volodymyrets Raion

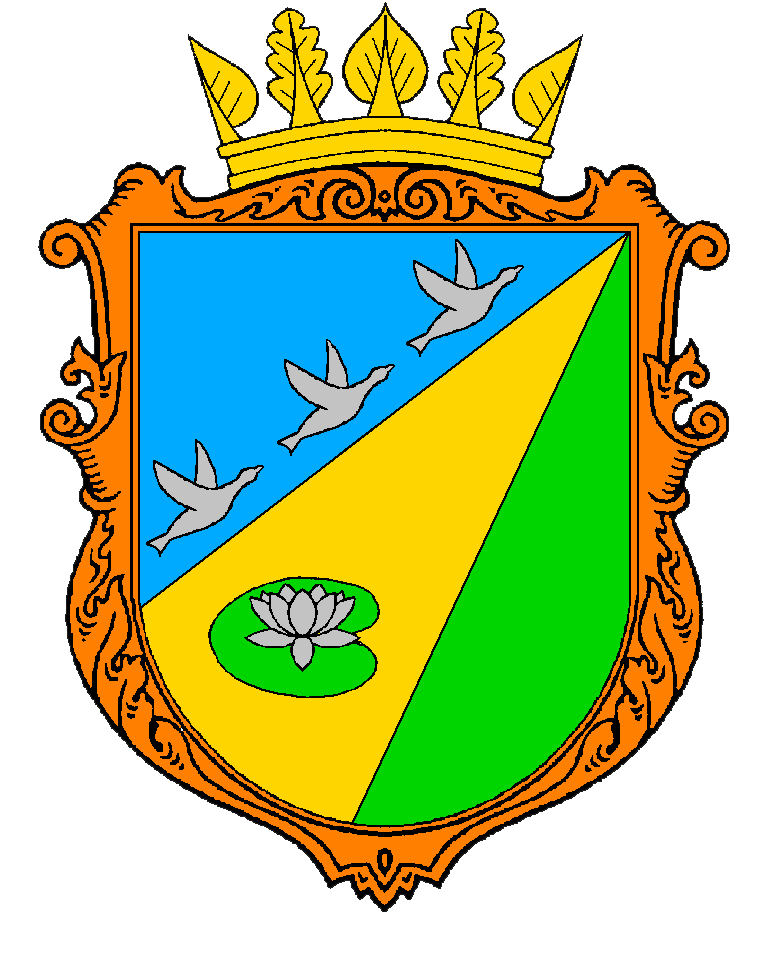
Zarichne Raion

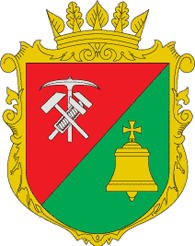
Zdolbuniv Raion

=== Sumy Oblast ===
Sumy

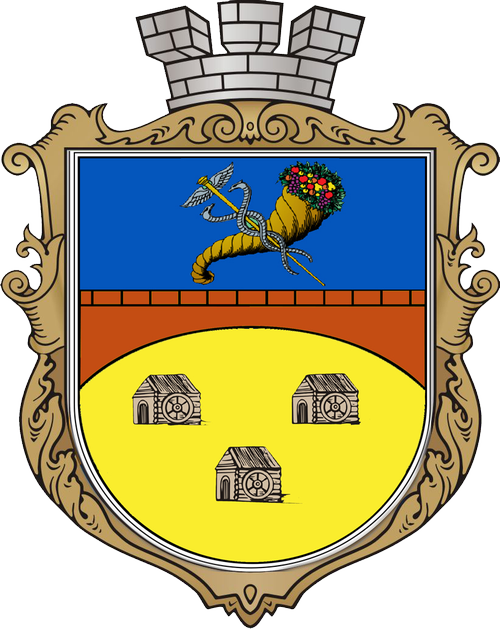
Bilopillia

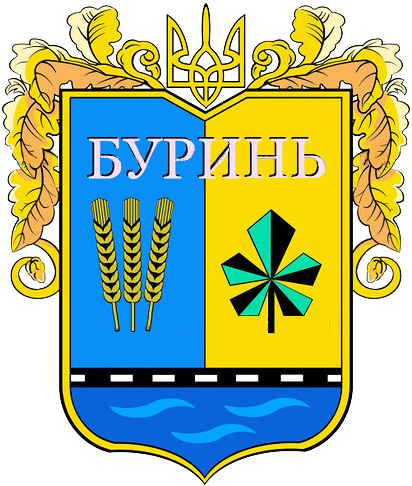
Buryn

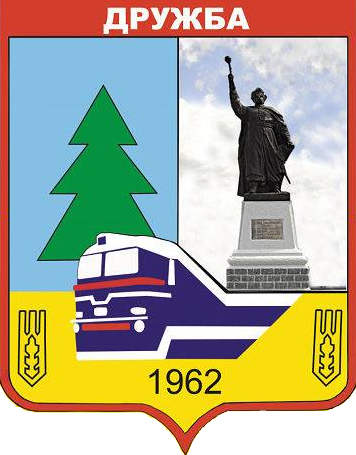
Druzhba

Esman

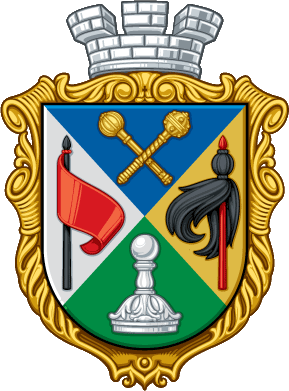
Hlukhiv

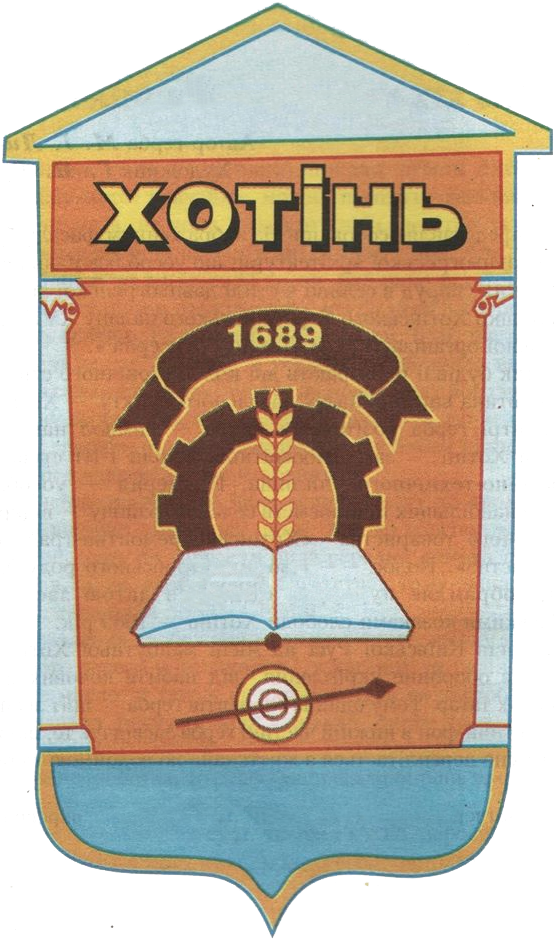
Khotin

Konotop

Krasnopillia

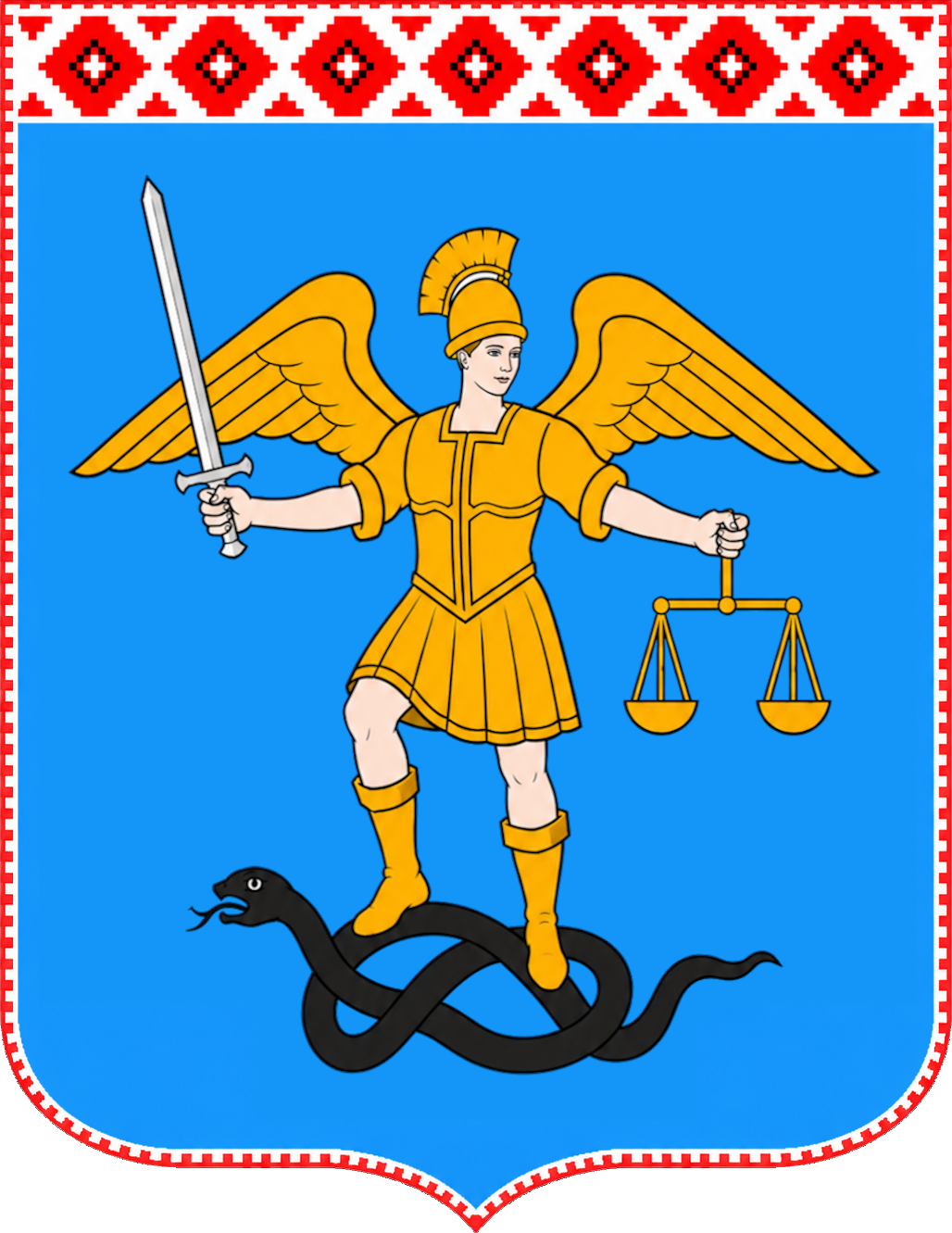
Krolevets

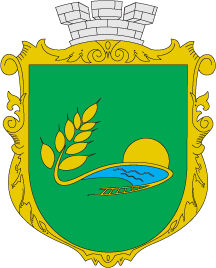
Kyrykivka

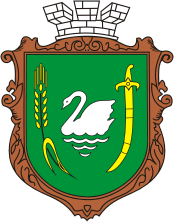
Lebedyn

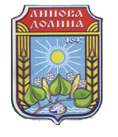
Lypova Dolyna

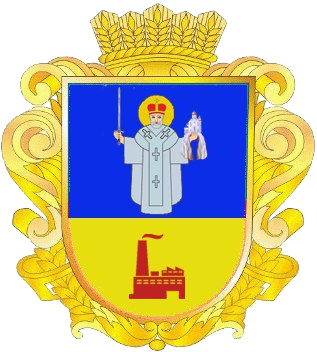
Mykolaivka

Nedryhailiv

Okhtyrka

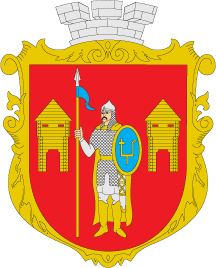
Putyvl

Romny

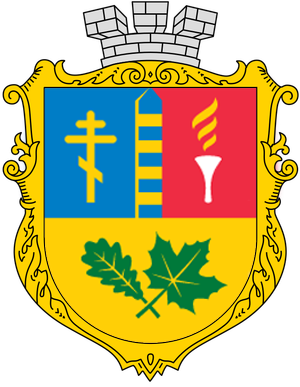
Seredyna-Buda

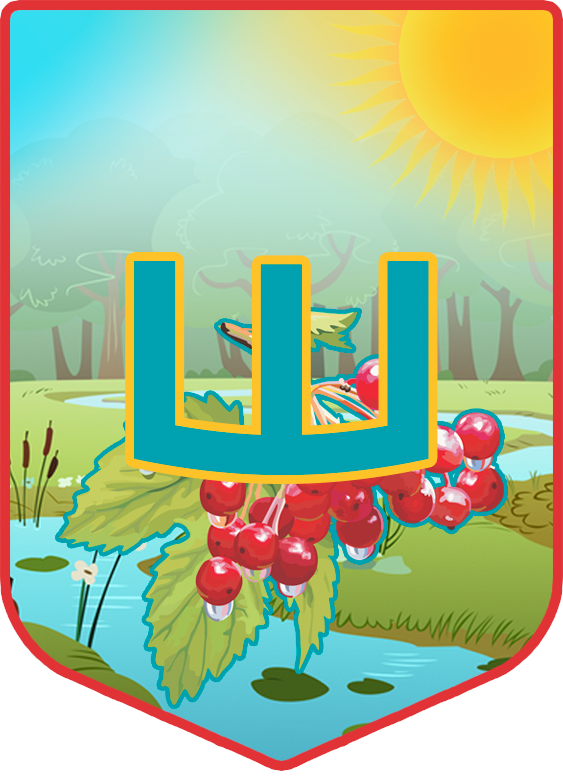
Shalyhyne

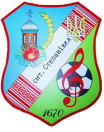
Stepanivka

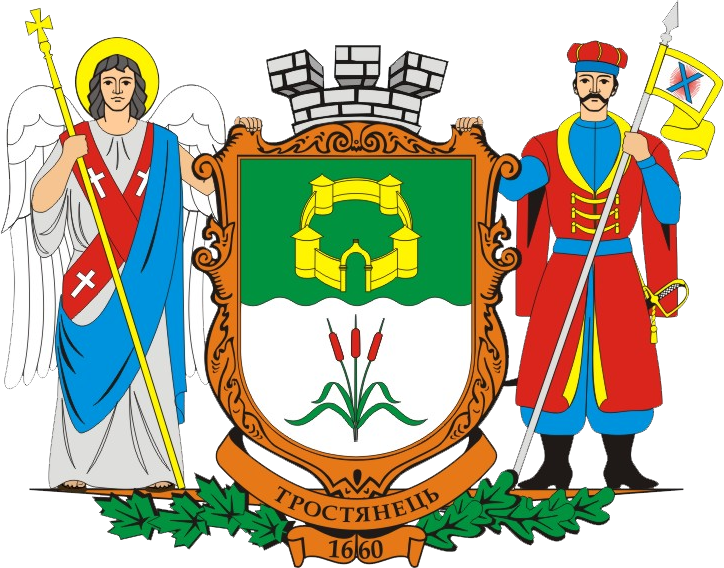
Trostianets

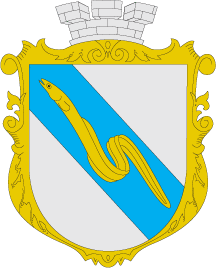
Uhroidy

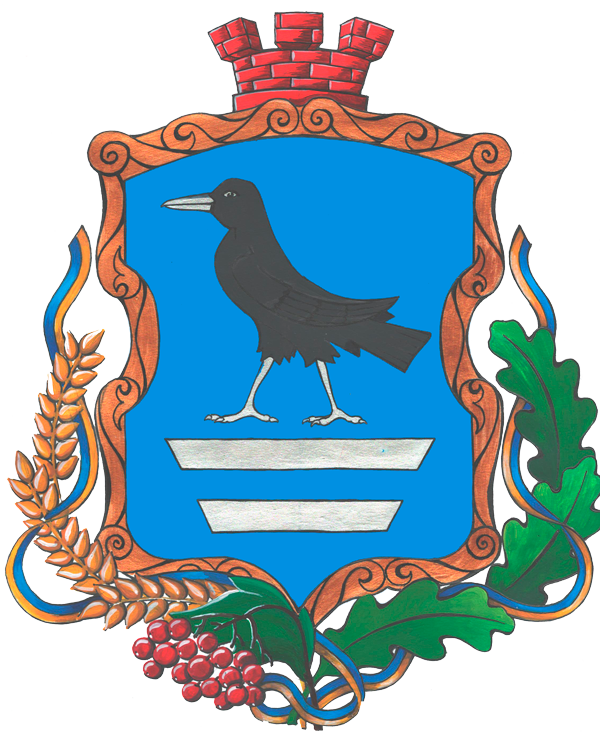
Voronizh

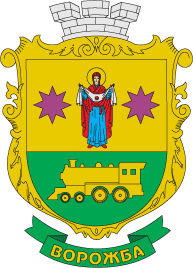
Vorozhba

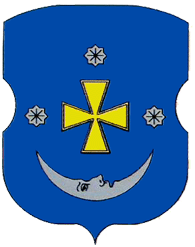
Yampil

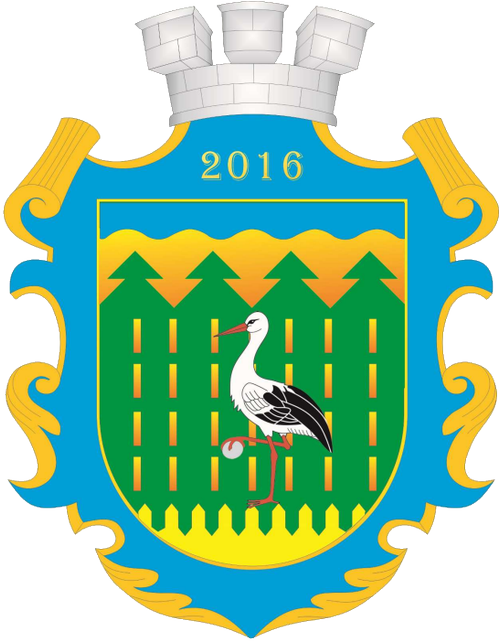
Znob-Novhorodske

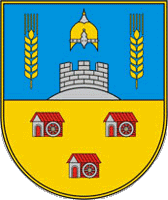
Bilopillia Raion

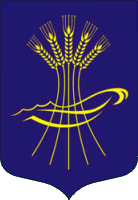
Buryn Raion

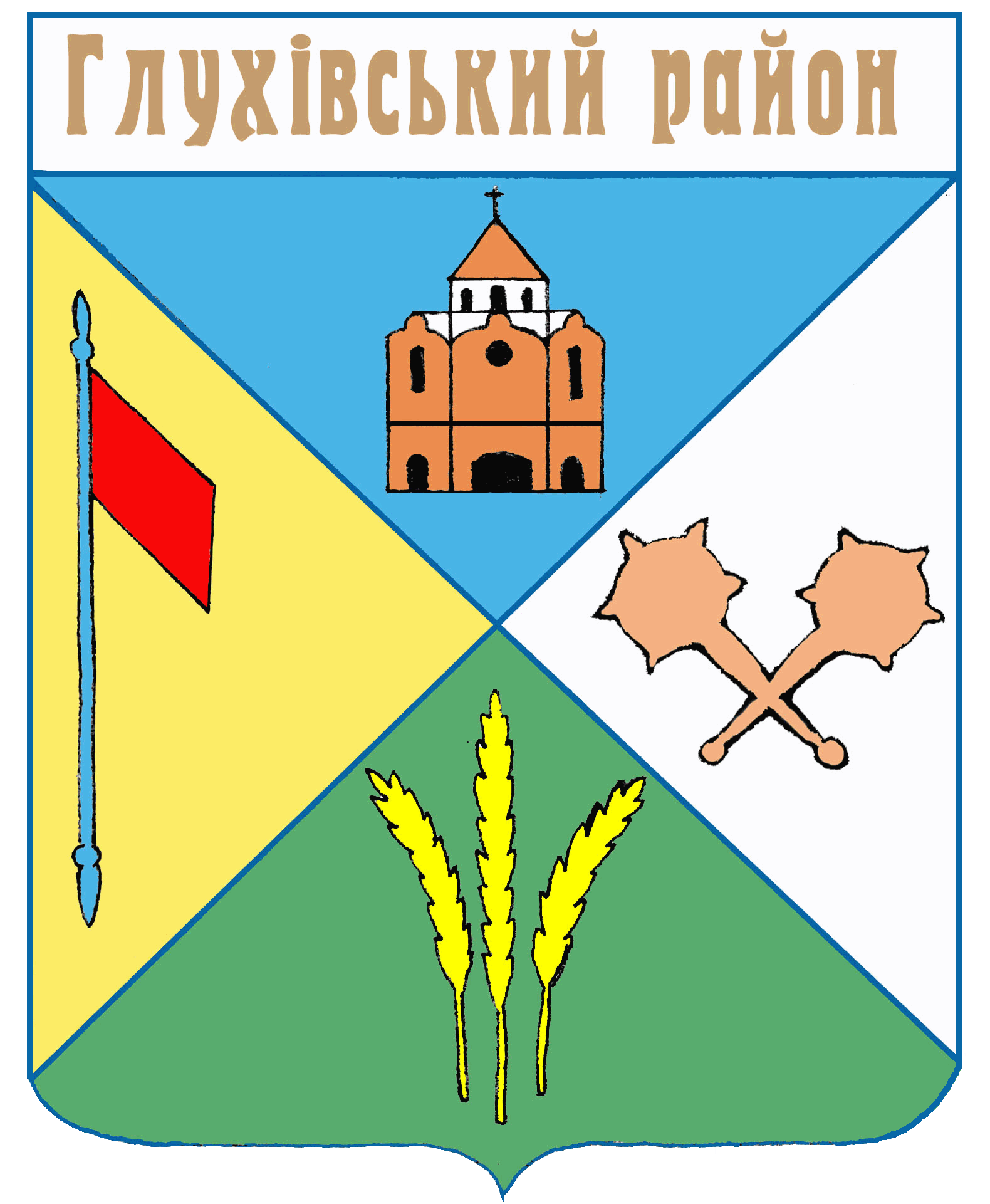
Hlukhiv Raion

Konotop Raion

Krasnopillia Raion

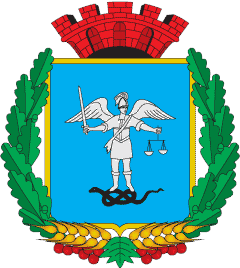
Krolevets Raion

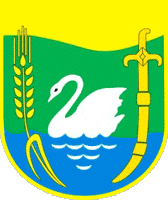
Lebedyn Raion

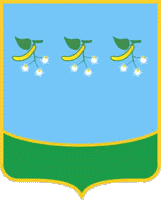
Lypova Dolyna Raion

Okhtyrka Raion

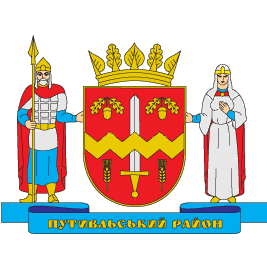
Putyvl Raion

Romny Raion

Seredyna-Buda Raion

Shostka Raion

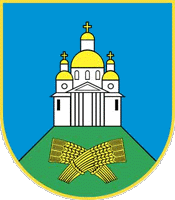
Sumy Raion

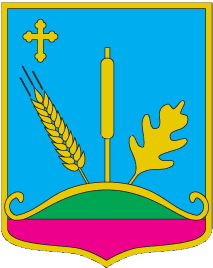
Trostianets Raion

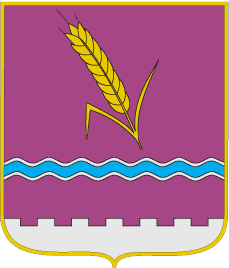
Velyka Pysarivka Raion

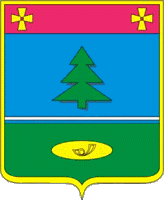
Yampil Raion

=== Ternopil Oblast ===
Ternopil

Berezhany

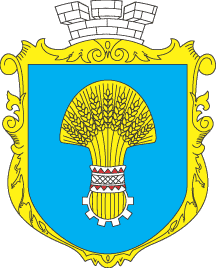
Borshchiv

Buchach

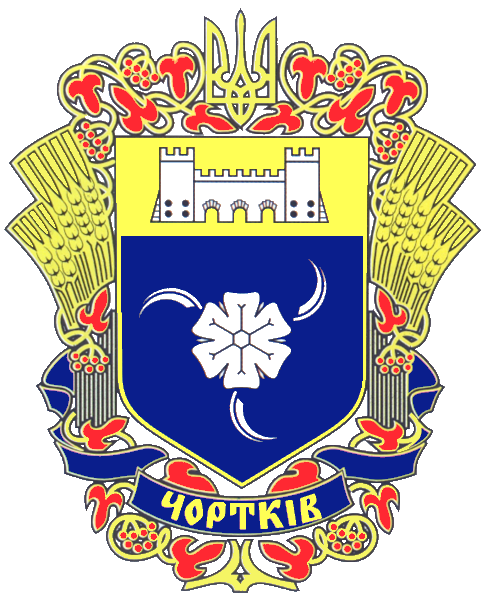
Chortkiv

Hrymailiv

Husiatyn

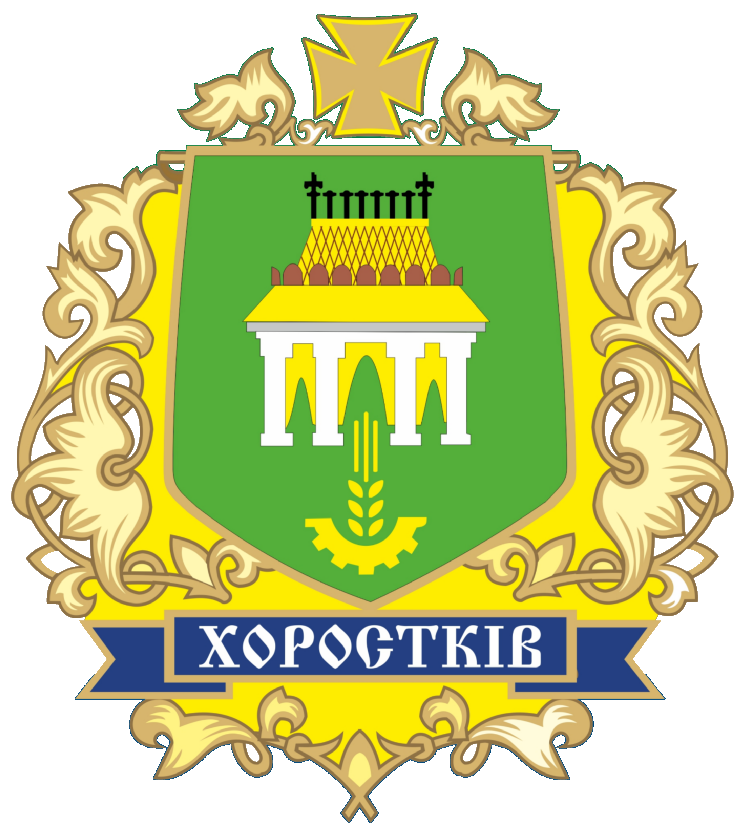
Khorostkiv

Kopychyntsi

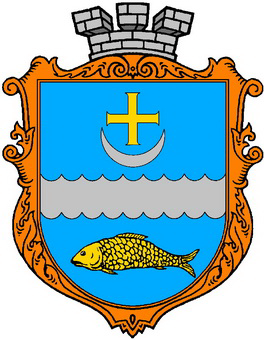
Koropets

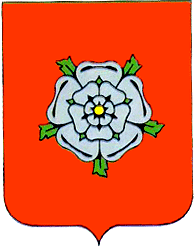
Kozliv

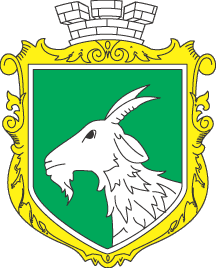
Kozova

Kremenets

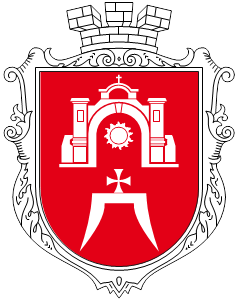
Lanivtsi

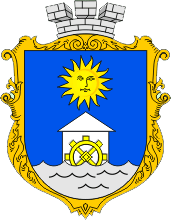
Melnytsia-Podilska

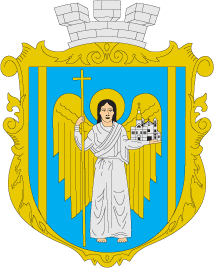
Monastyryska

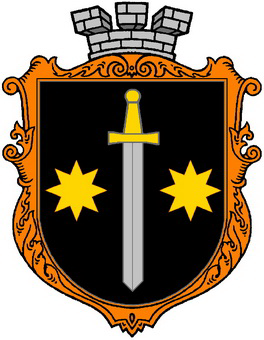
Mykulyntsi

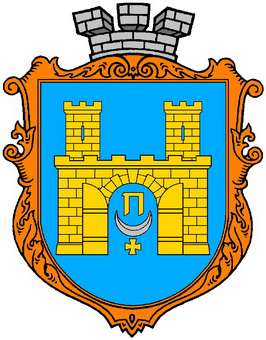
Pidhaitsi

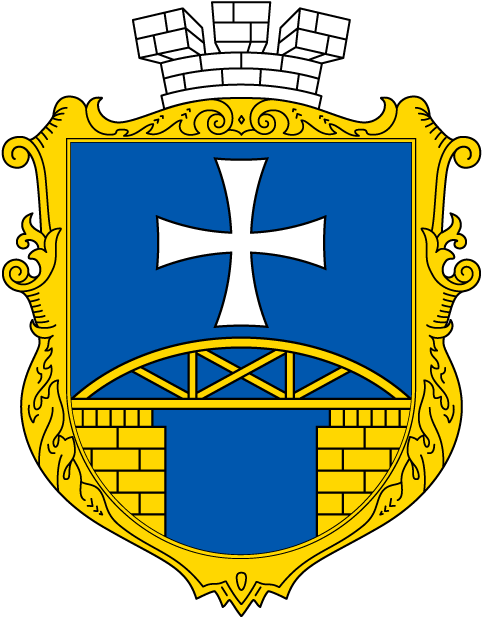
Pidvolochysk

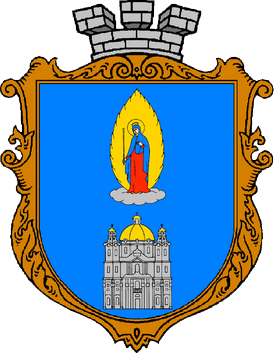
Pochaiv

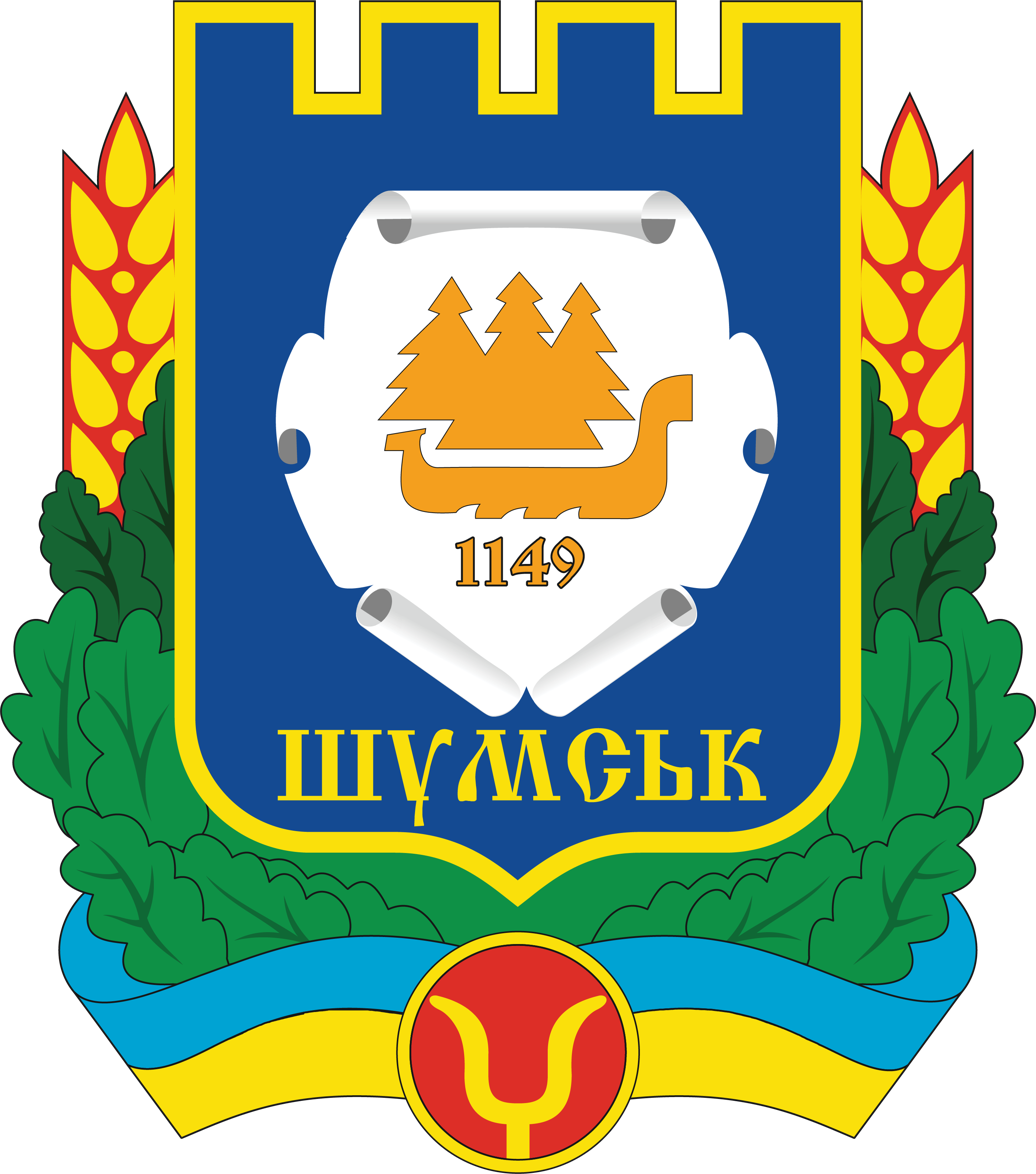
Shumsk

Skala-Podilska

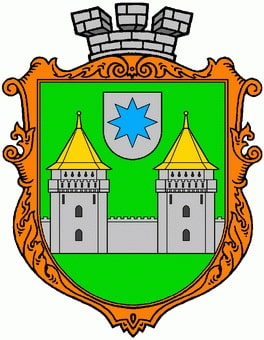
Skalat

Terebovlia

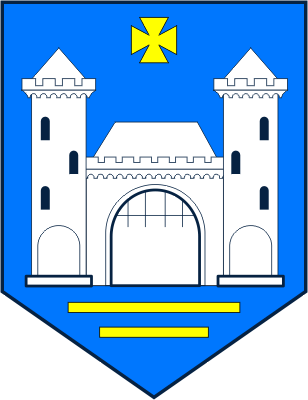
Tovste

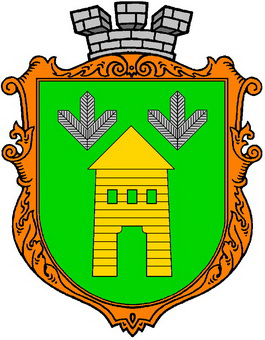
Velyki Birky

Vyshnivets

Zalishchyky

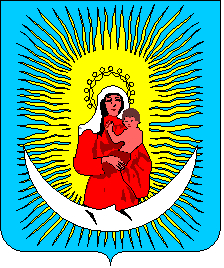
Zaliztsi

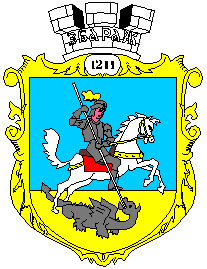
Zbarazh

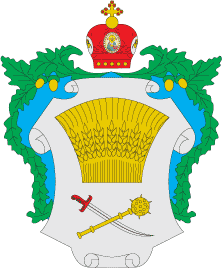
Zboriv

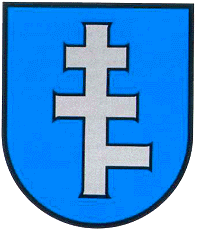
Zolotyi Potik

Berezhany Raion

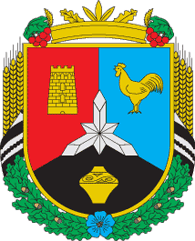
Borshchiv Raion

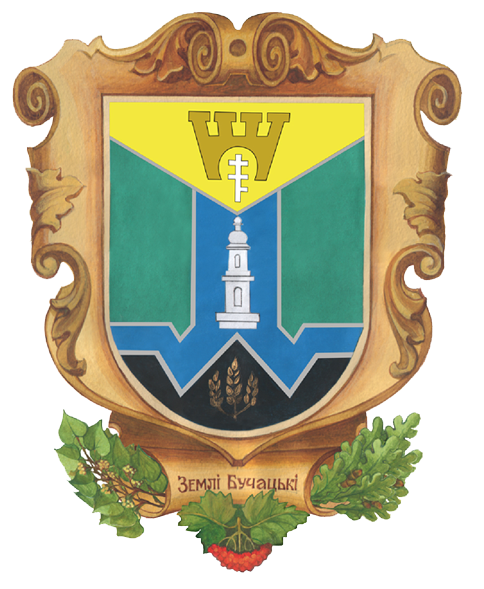
Buchach Raion

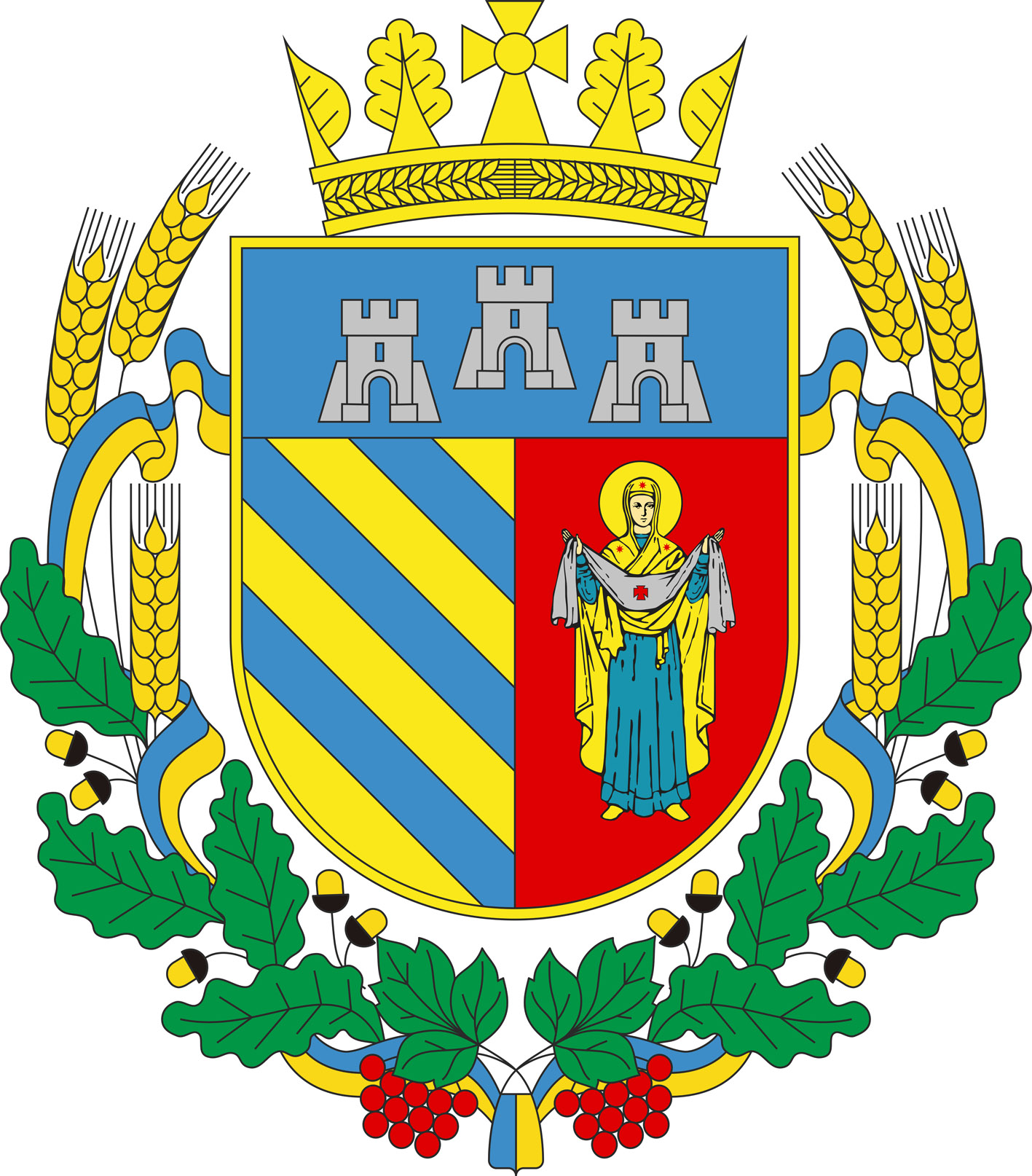
Chortkiv Raion

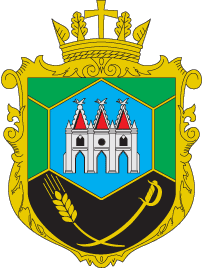
Husiatyn Raion

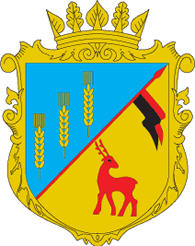
Kozova Raion

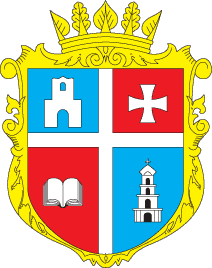
Kremenets Raion

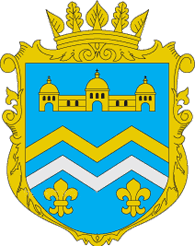
Monastyryska Raion

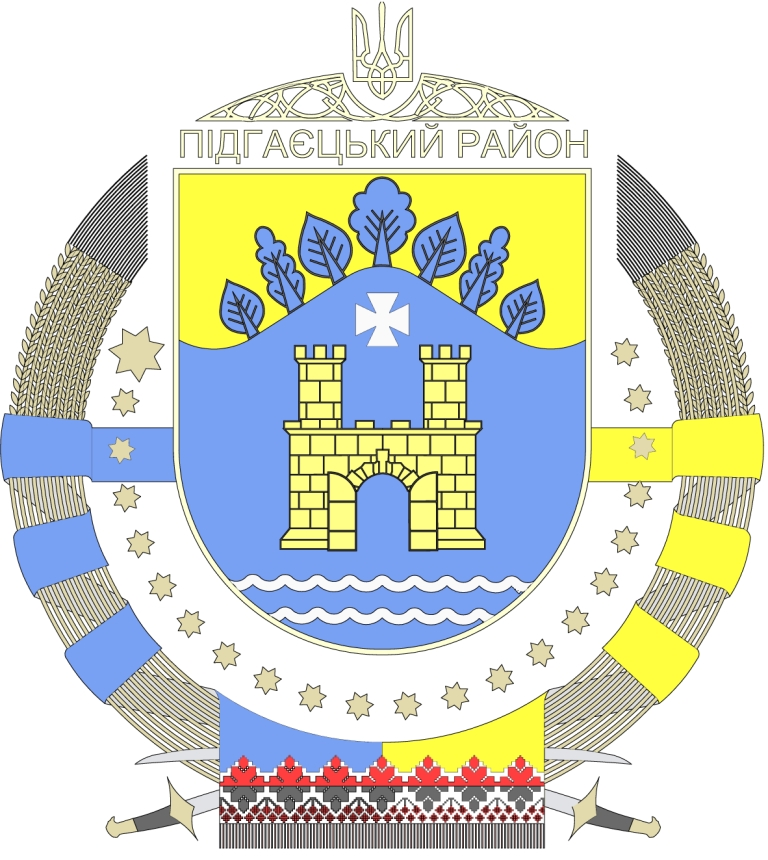
Pidhaitsi Raion

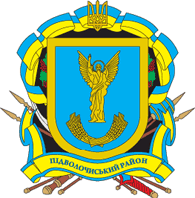
Pidvolochysk Raion

Shumsk Raion

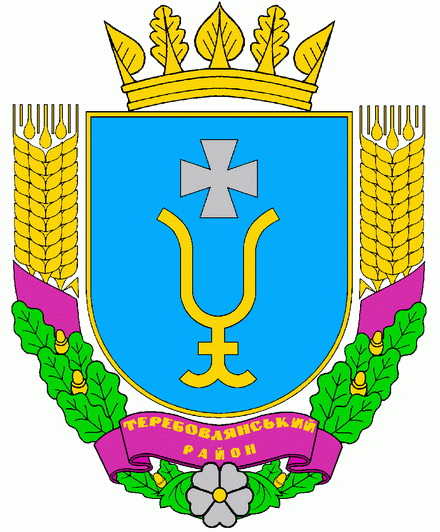
Terebovlia Raion

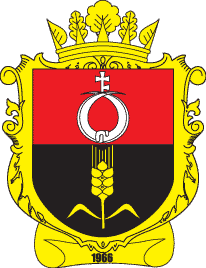
Ternopil Raion

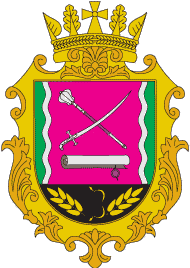
Zboriv Raion

=== Vinnytsia Oblast ===
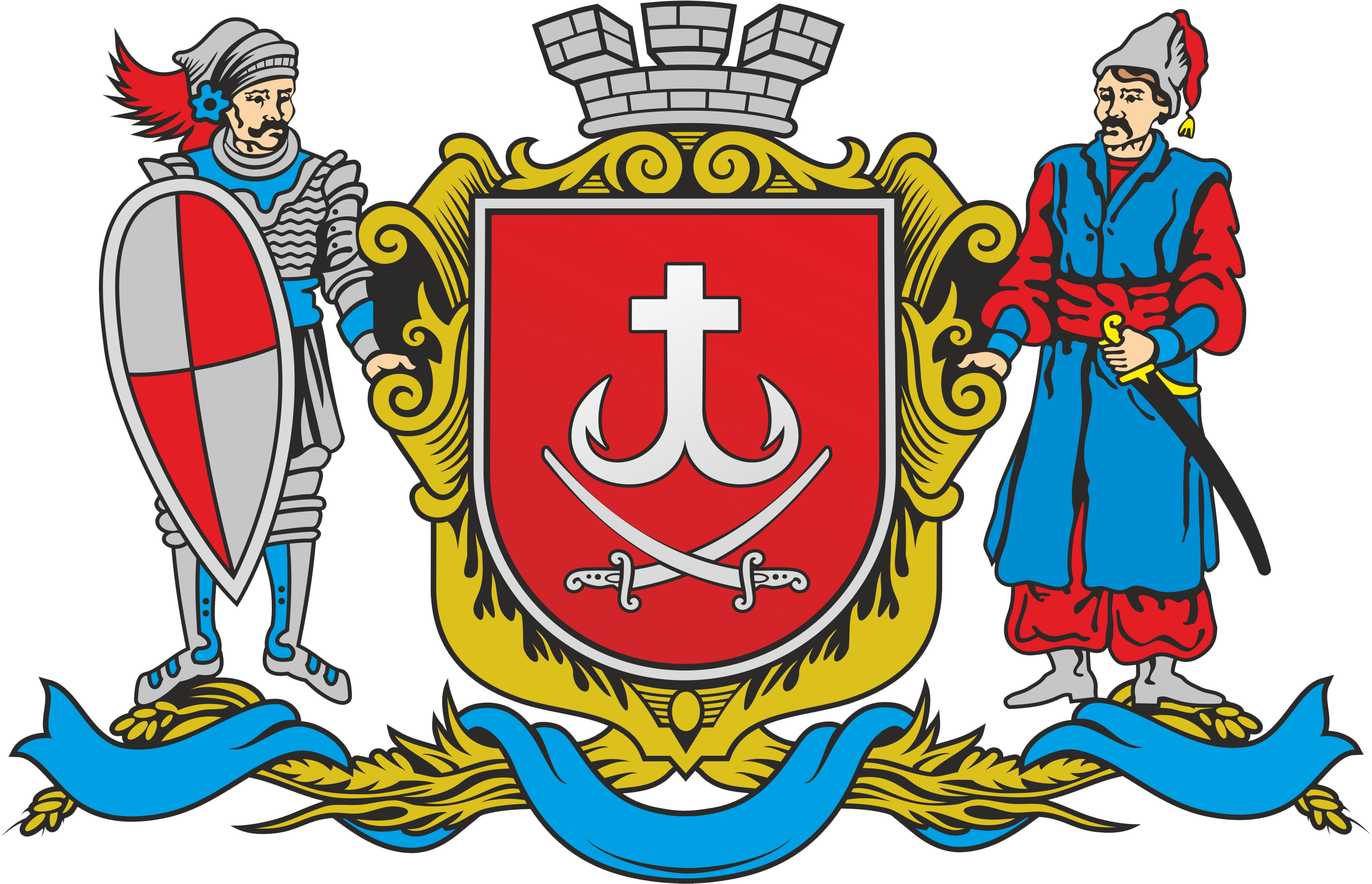
Vinnytsia

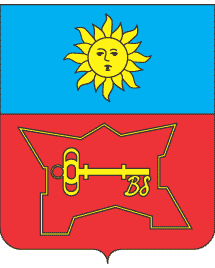
Bar

Bershad

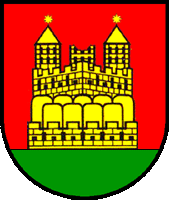
Bratslav

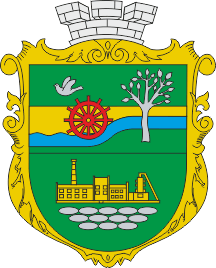
Brodetske

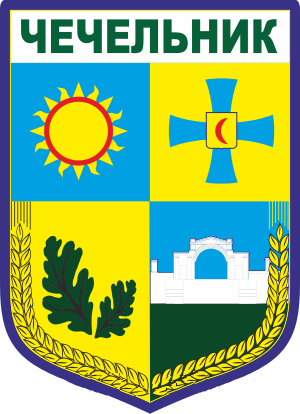
Chechelnyk

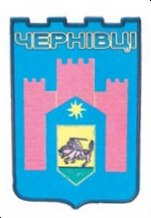
Chernivtsi

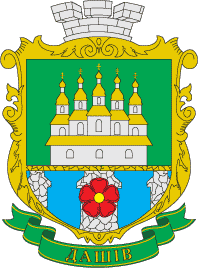
Dashiv

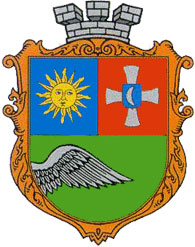
Haisyn

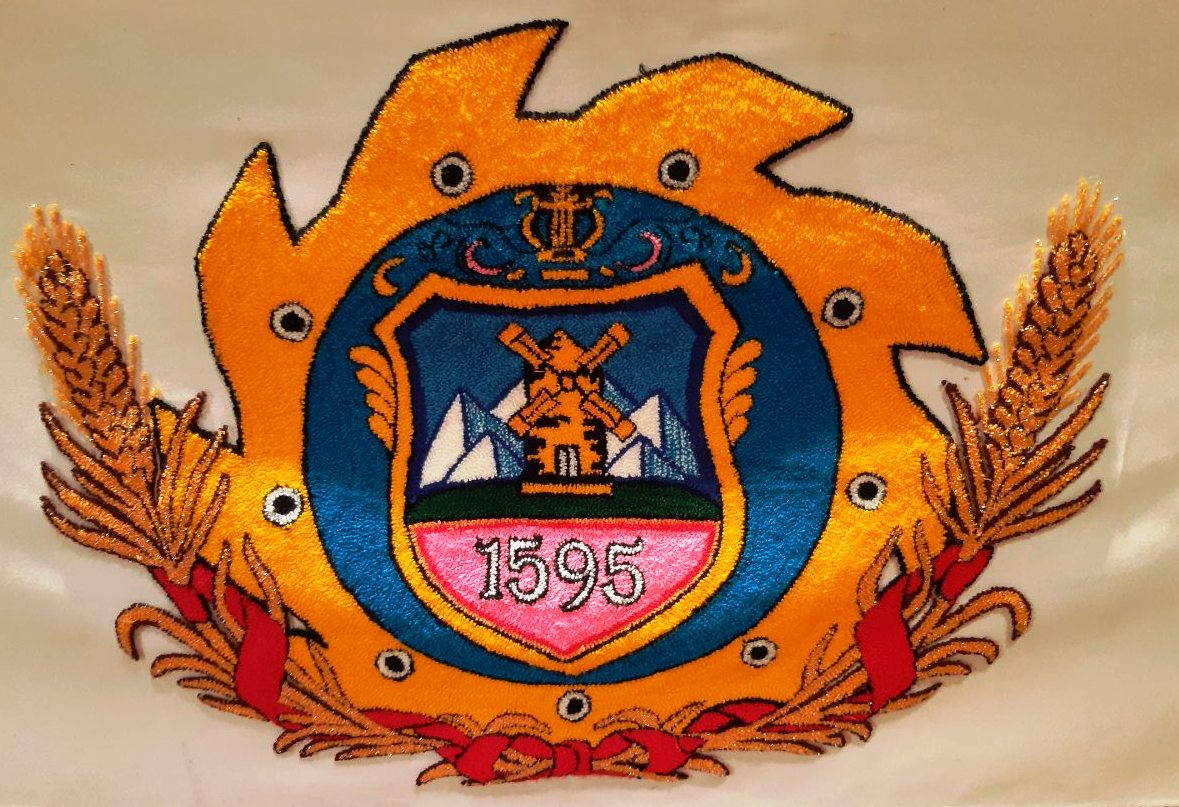
Hlukhivtsi

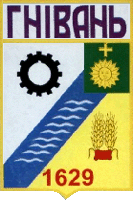
Hnivan

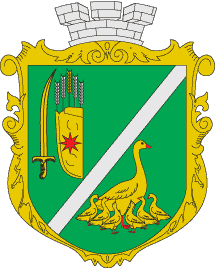
Illintsi

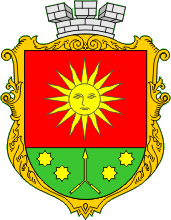
Kalynivka

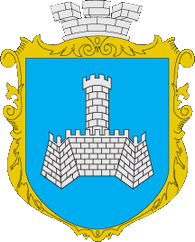
Khmilnyk

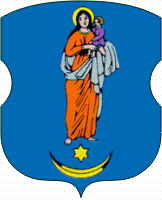
Kopaigorod

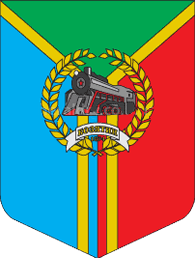
Koziatyn

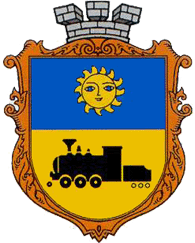
Kryzhopil

Ladyzhyn

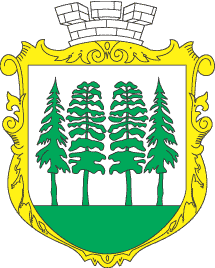
Lityn

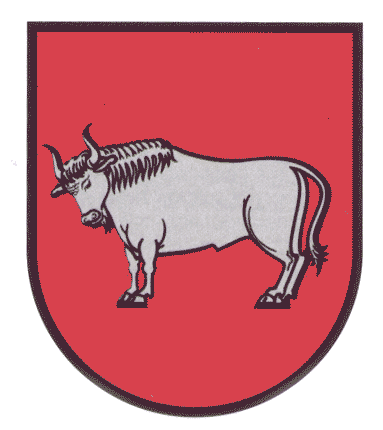
Lypovets

Mohyliv-Podilskyi

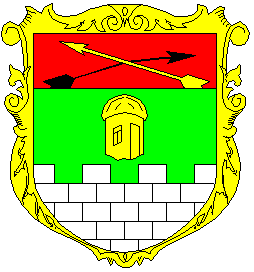
Murovani Kurylivtsi

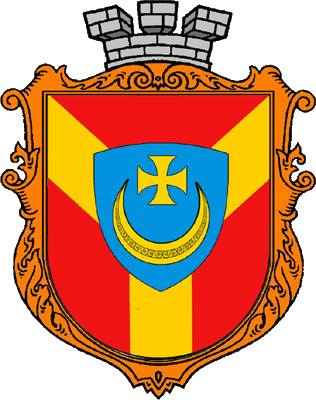
Nemyriv

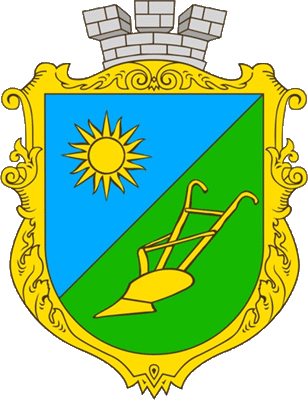
Orativ

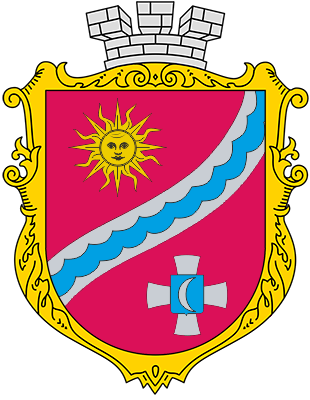
Pohrebyshche

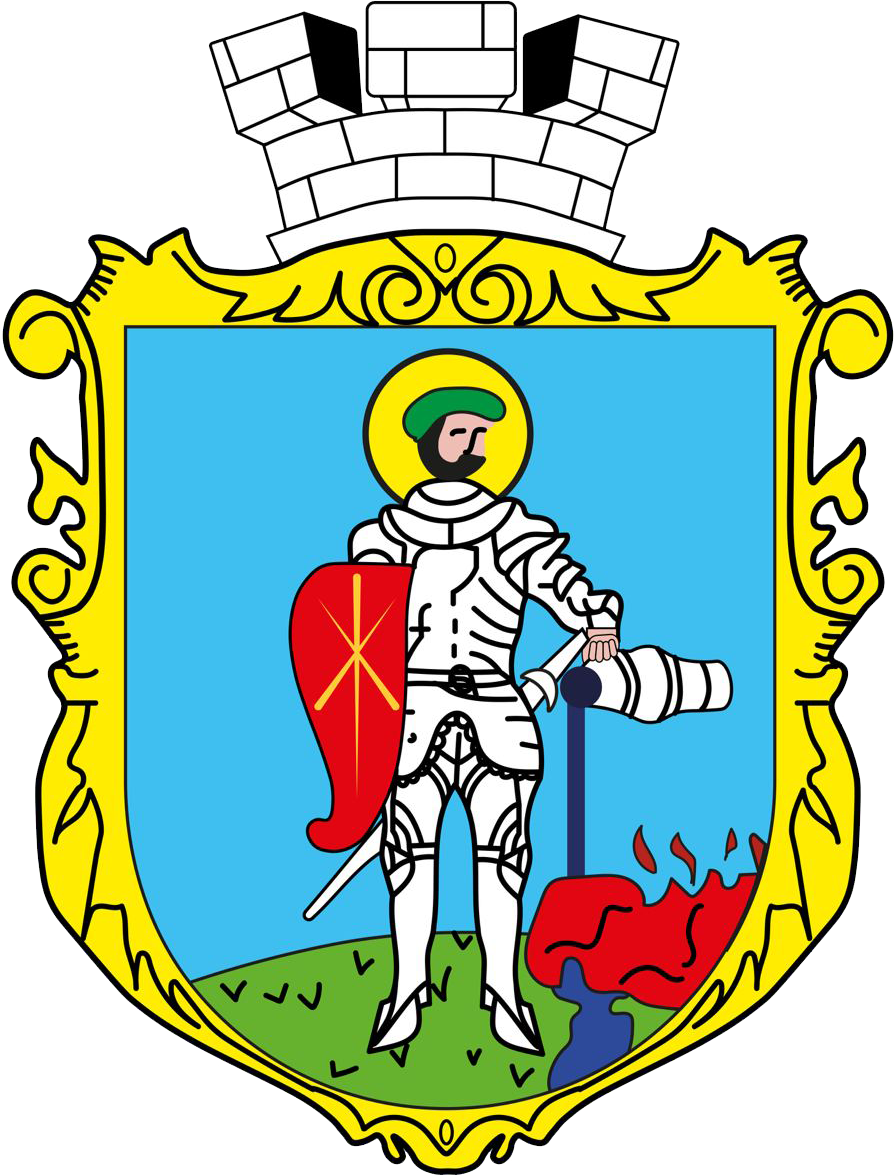
Sharhorod

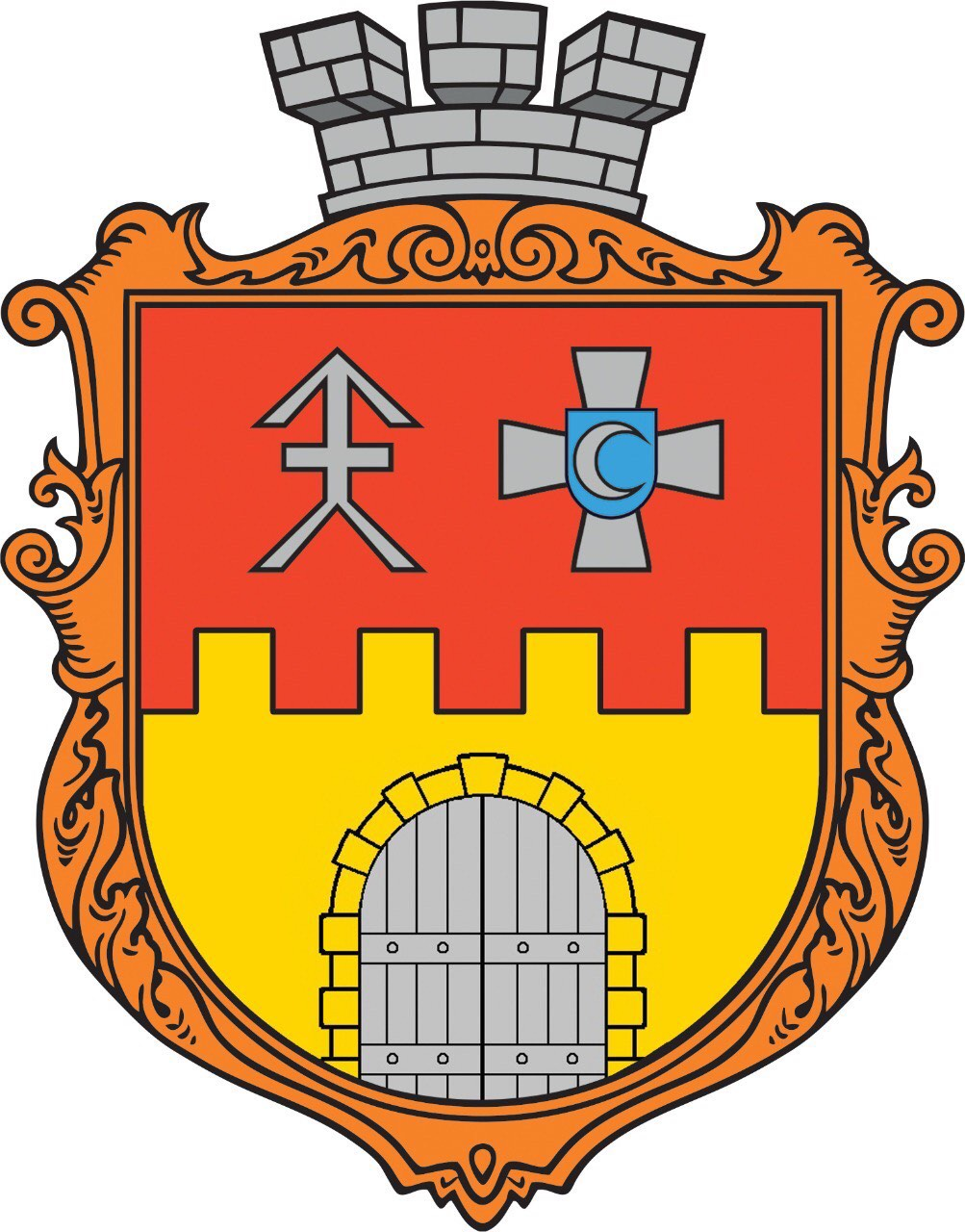
Stryzhavka

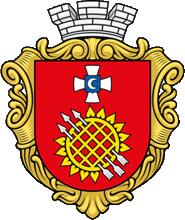
Sytkivtsi

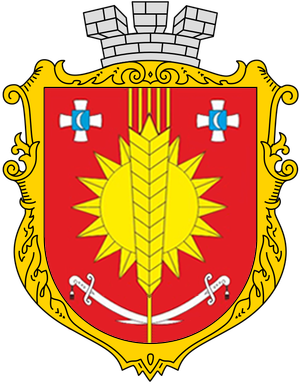
Teplyk

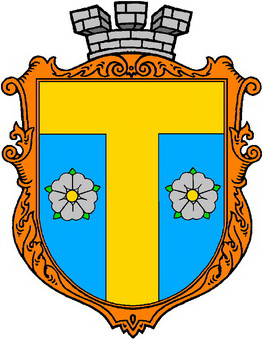
Tomashpil

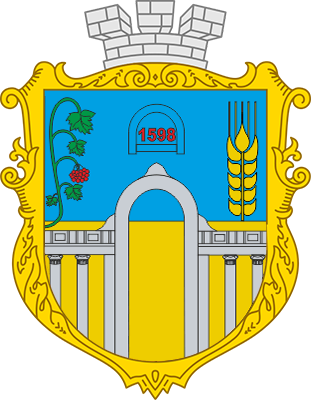
Trostianets

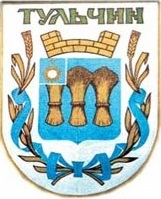
Tulchyn

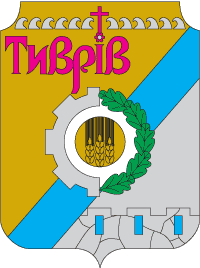
Tyvriv

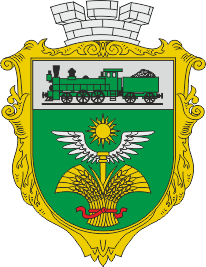
Vapniarka

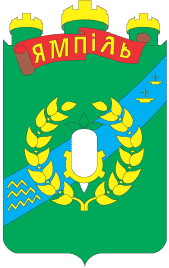
Yampil

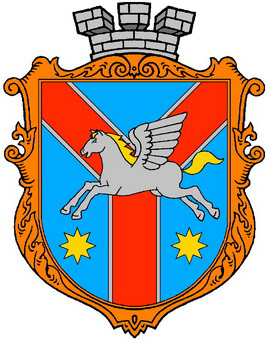
Zhmerynka

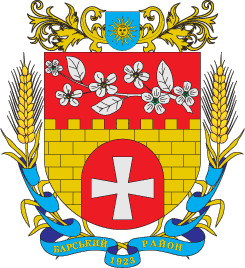
Bar Raion

Bershad Raion

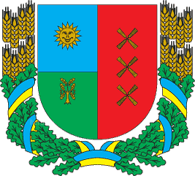
Chechelnyk Raion

Chernivtsi Raion

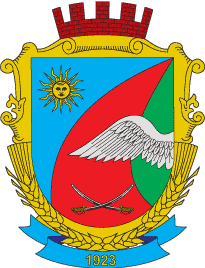
Haisyn Raion

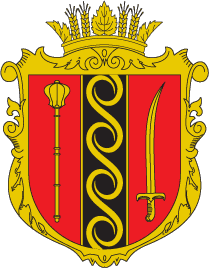
Illintsi Raion

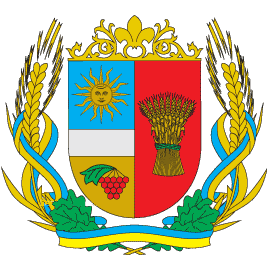
Kalynivka Raion

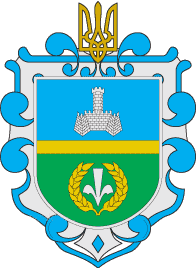
Khmilnyk Raion

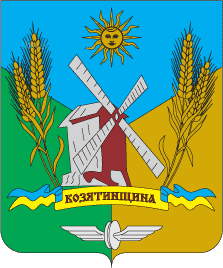
Koziatyn Raion

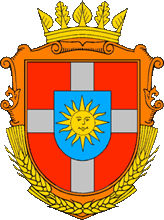
Kryzhopil Raion

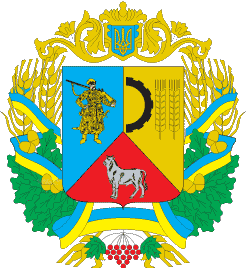
Lypovets Raion

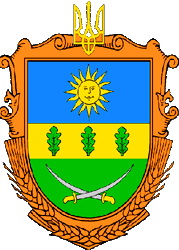
Lityn Raion

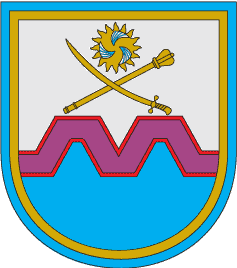
Mohyliv-Podilskyi Raion

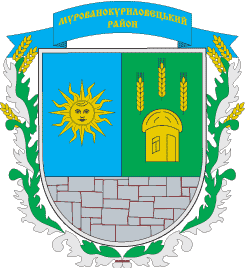
Murovani Kurylivtsi Raion

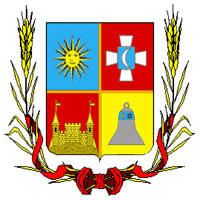
Nemyriv Raion

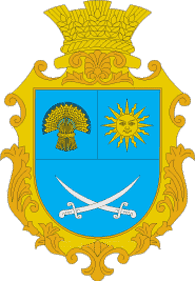
Orativ Raion

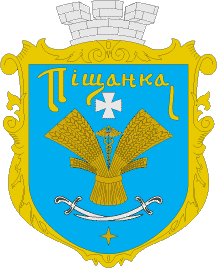
Pishchanka Raion

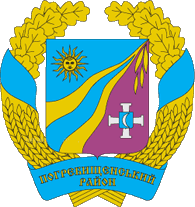
Pohrebyshche Raion

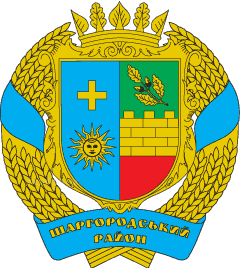
Sharhorod Raion

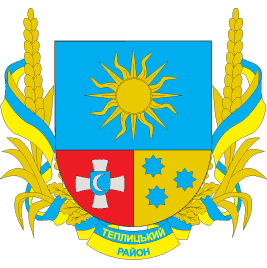
Teplyk Raion

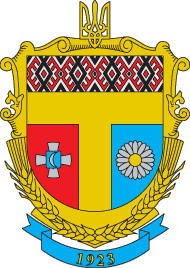
Tomashpil Raion

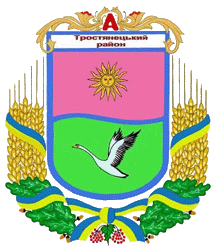
Trostianets Raion

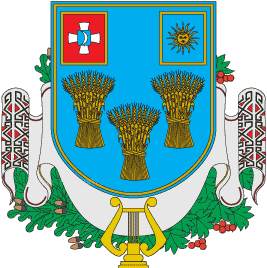
Tulchyn Raion

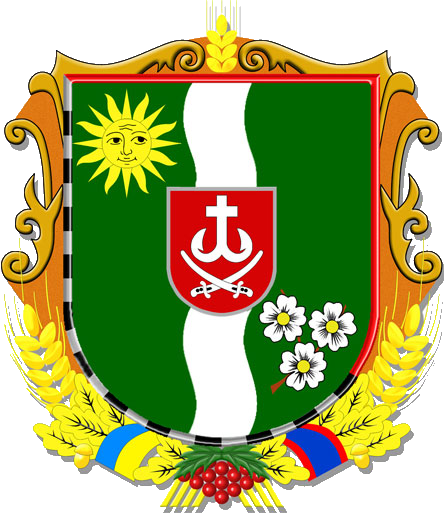
Vinnytsia Raion

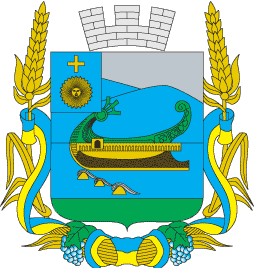
Yampil Raion

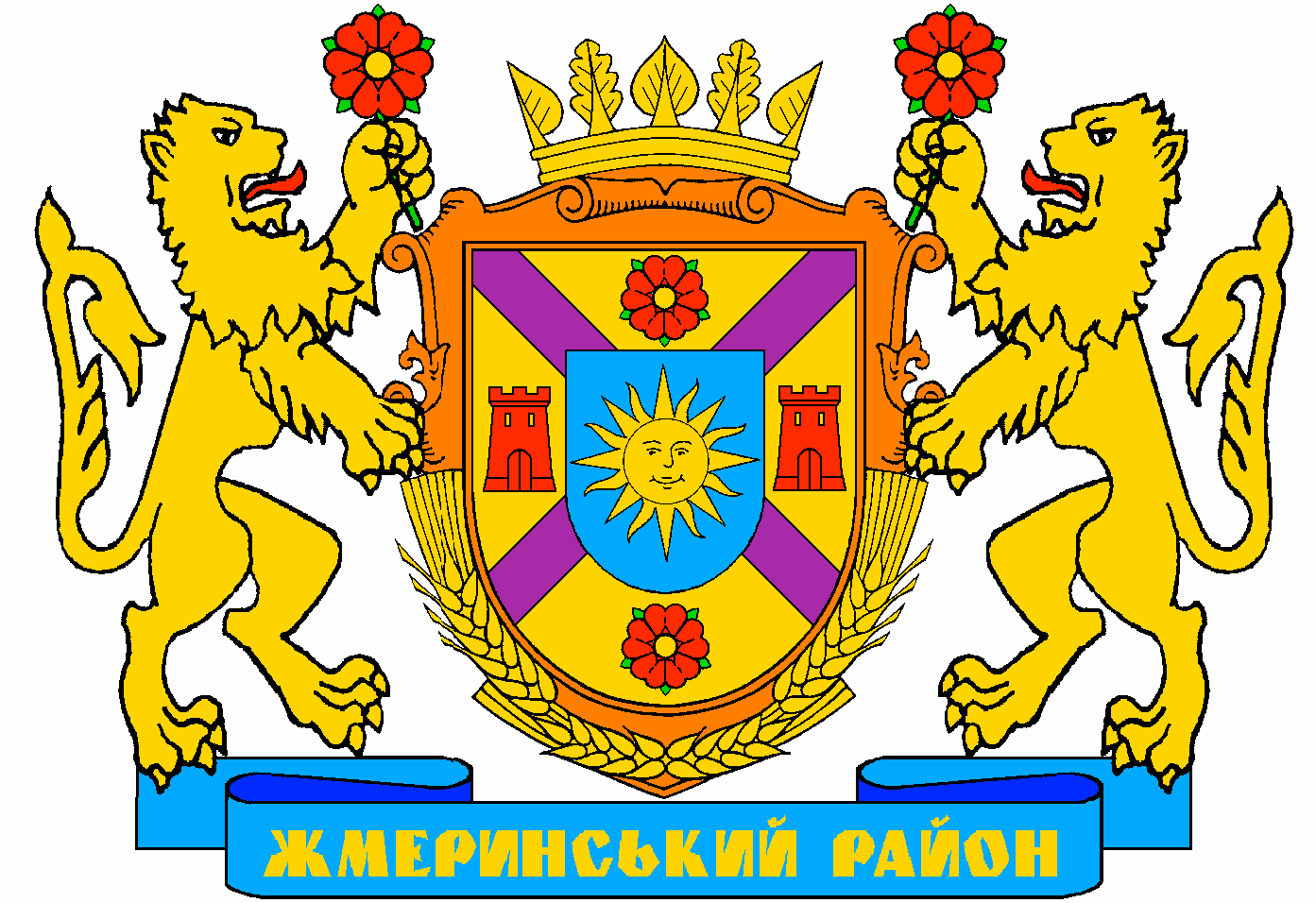
Zhmerynka Raion

=== Volyn Oblast ===
Lutsk

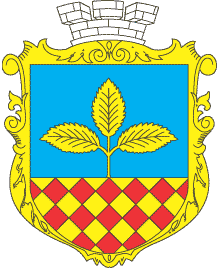
Berestechko

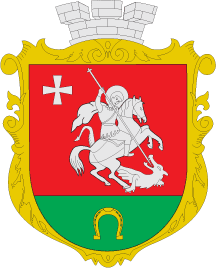
Holoby

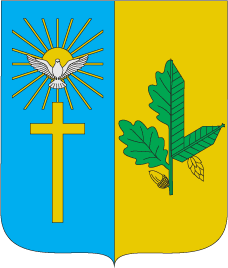
Holovne

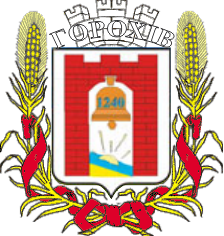
Horokhiv

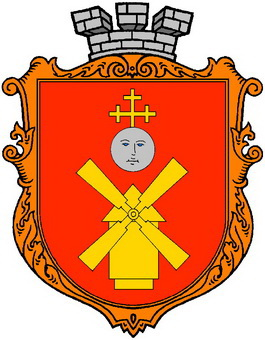
Ivanychi

Kamin-Kashyrskyi

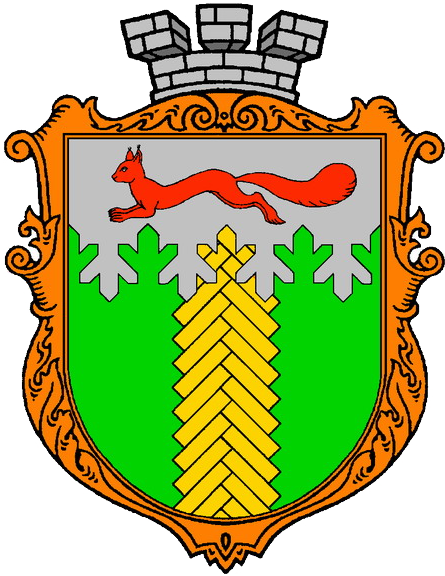
Kivertsi

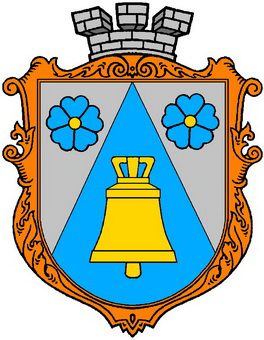
Kolky

Kovel

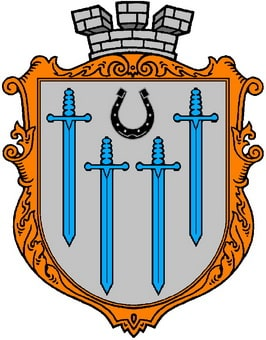
Liublynets

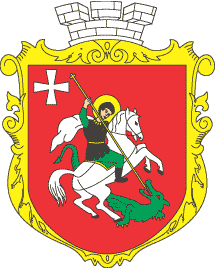
Liuboml

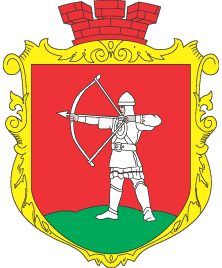
Lokachi

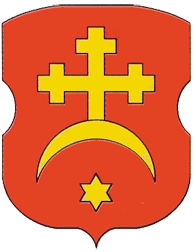
Lukiv

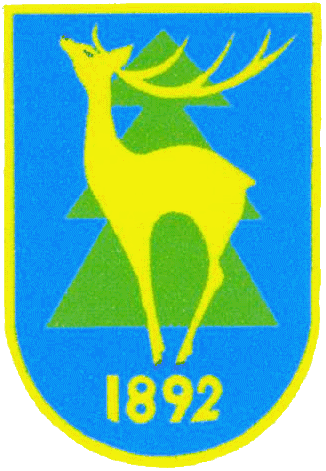
Manevychi

Novovolynsk

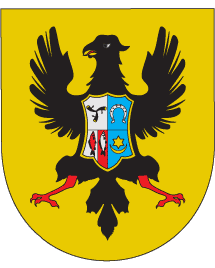
Olyka

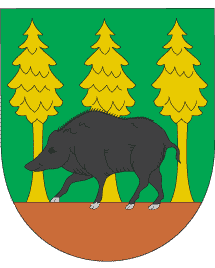
Ratne

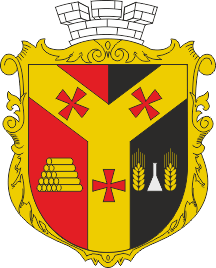
Rokyni

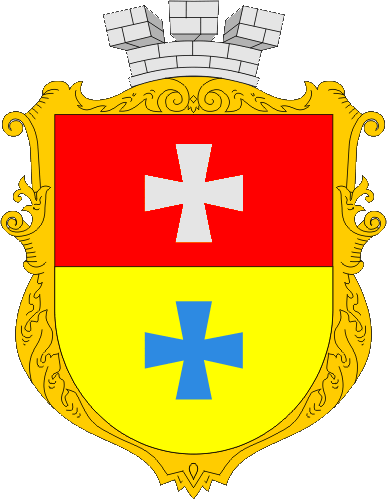
Rozhyshche

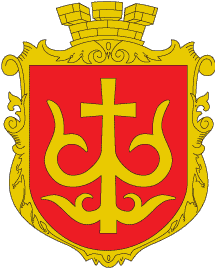
Shatsk

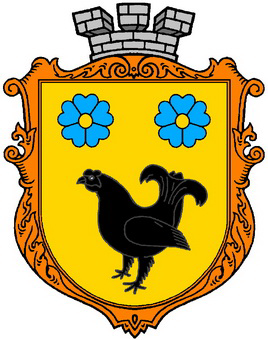
Stara Vyzhivka

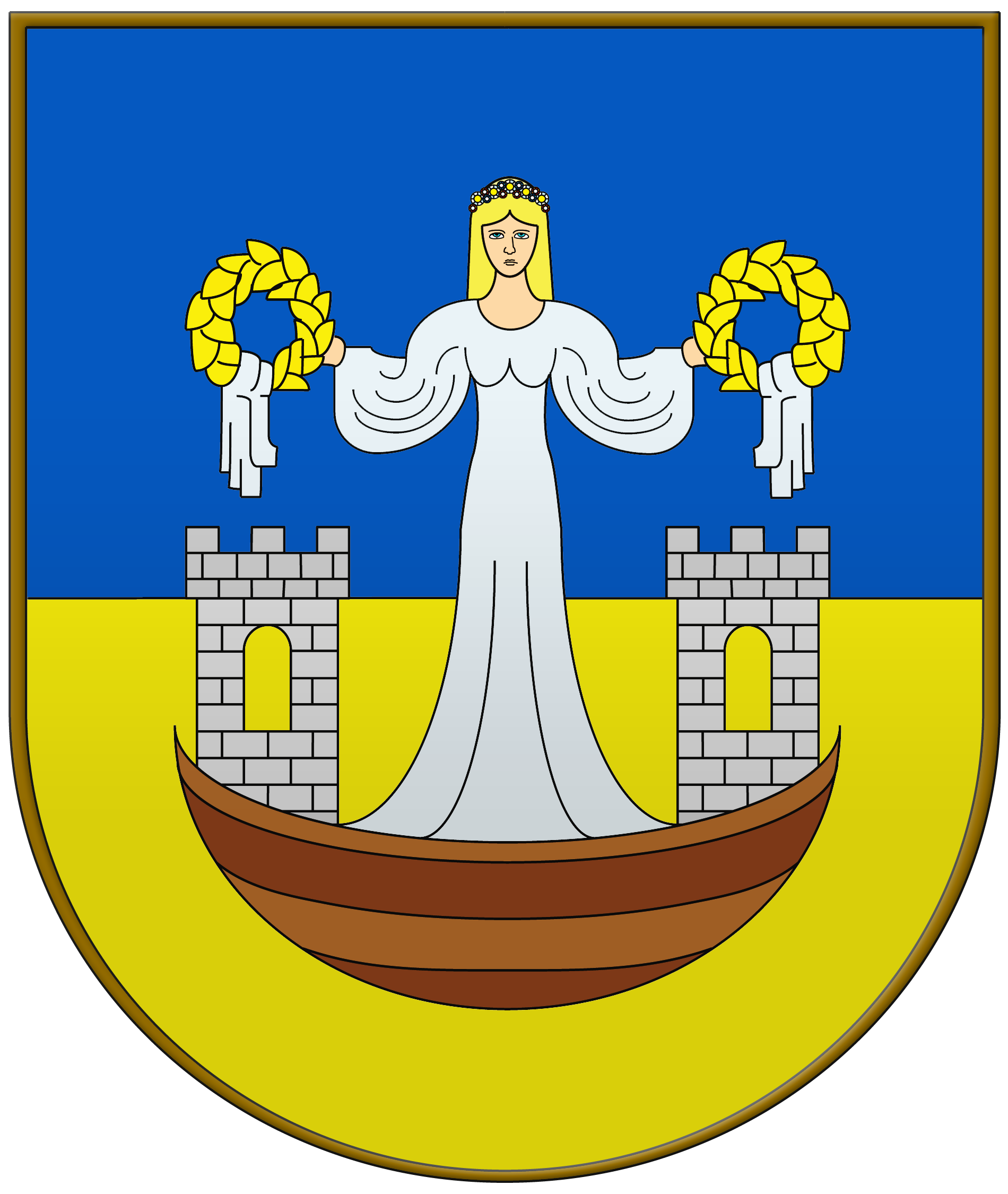
Torchyn

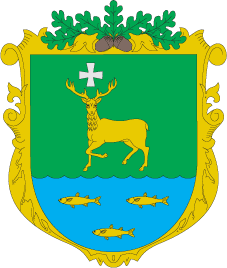
Tsuman

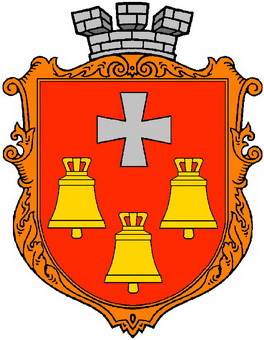
Turiisk

Ustyluh

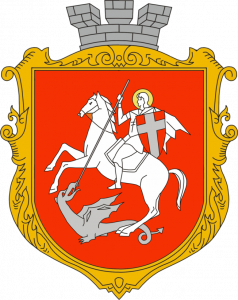
Volodymyr

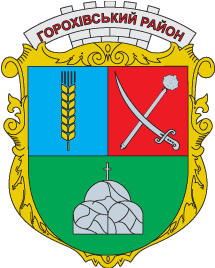
Horokhiv Raion

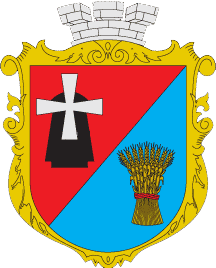
Ivanychi Raion

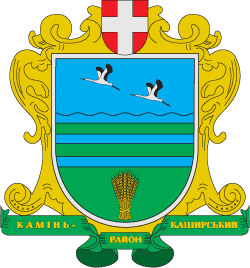
Kamin-Kashyrskyi Raion

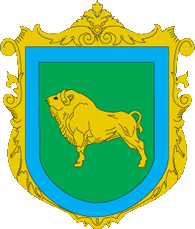
Kivertsi Raion

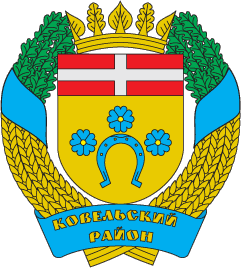
Kovel Raion

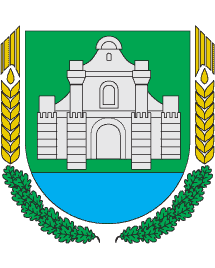
Liubeshiv Raion

Liuboml Raion

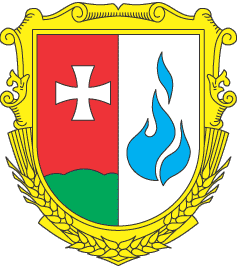
Lokachi Raion

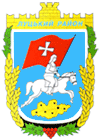
Lutsk Raion

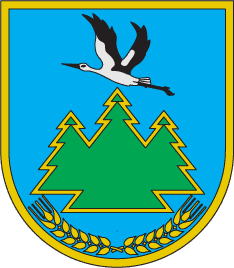
Manevychi Raion

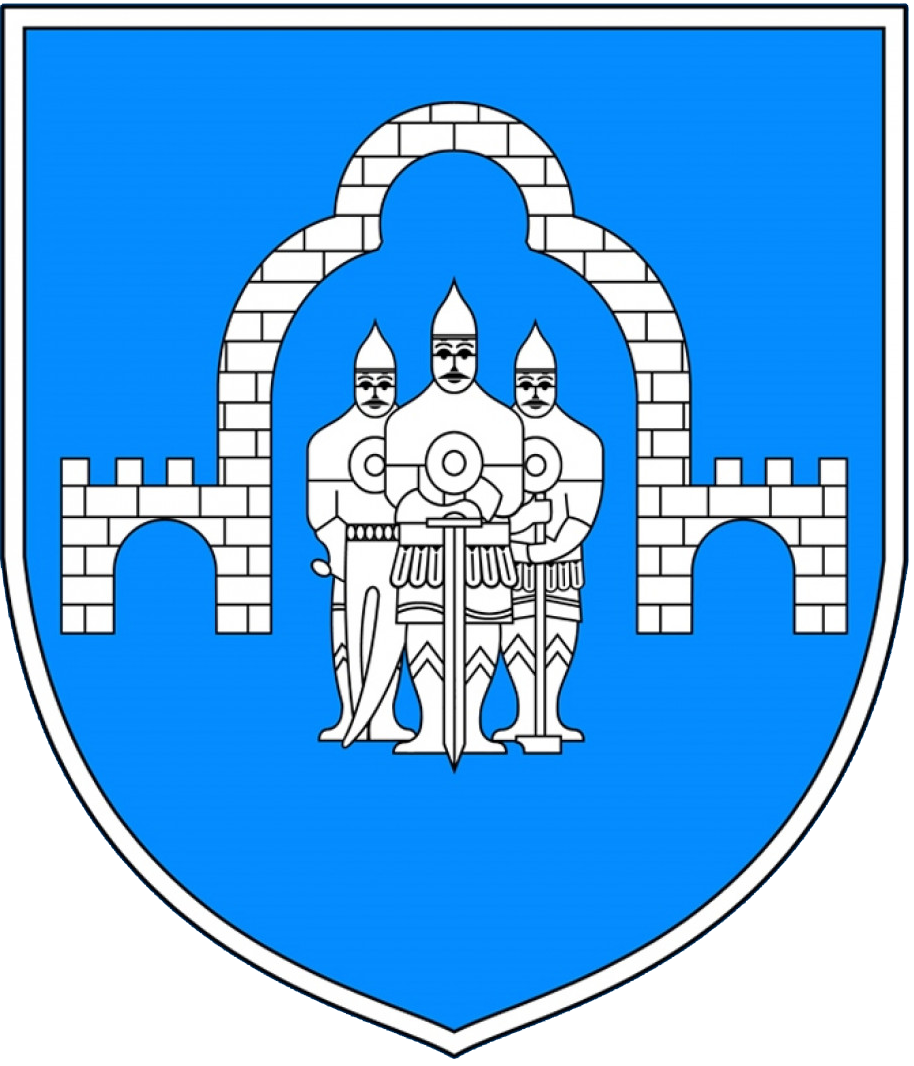
Ratne Raion

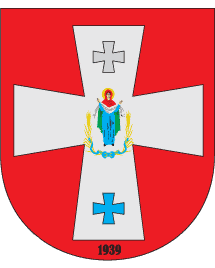
Rozhyshche Raion

Shatsk Raion

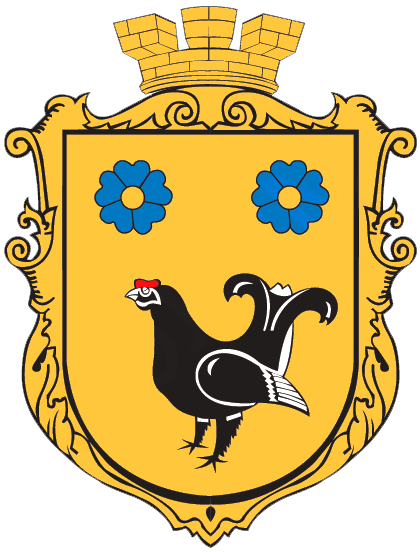
Stara Vyzhivka Raion

Turiisk Raion

Volodymyr-Volynskyi Raion

=== Zakarpattia Oblast ===
Uzhhorod

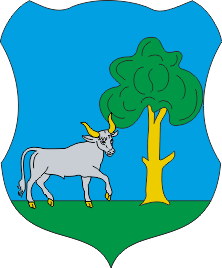
Batiovo

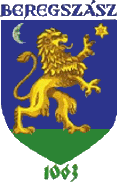
Berehove

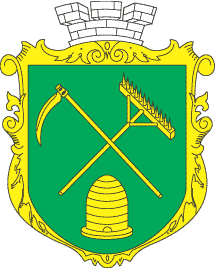
Bushtyno

Chop

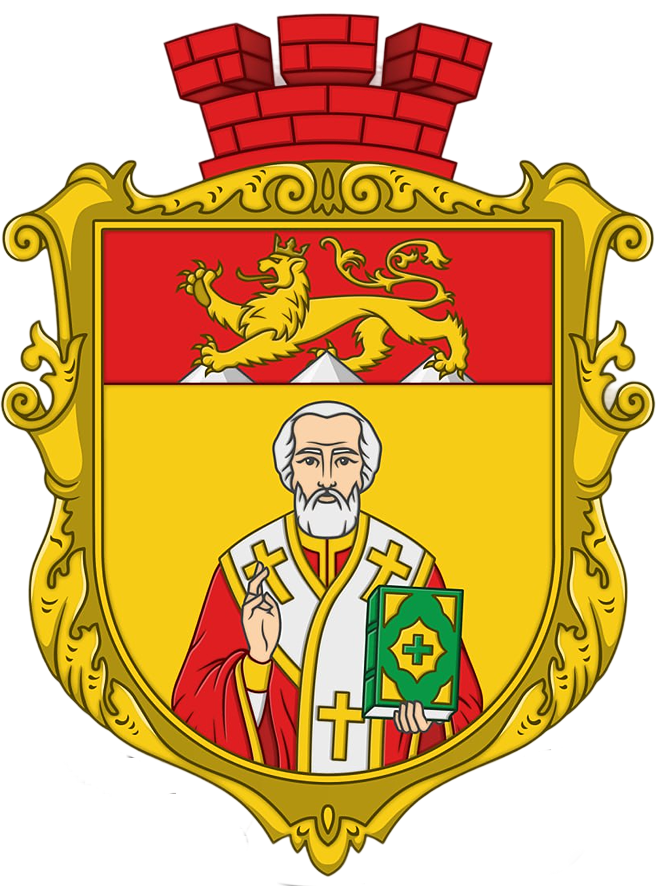
Chynadiiovo

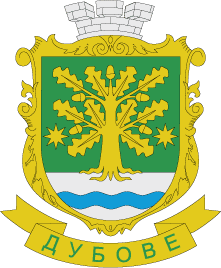
Dubove

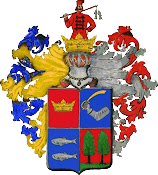
Irshava

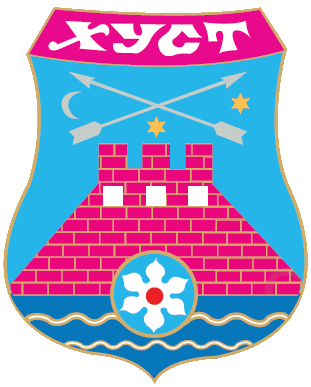
Khust

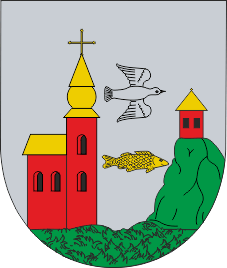
Korolevo

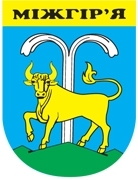
Mizhhiria

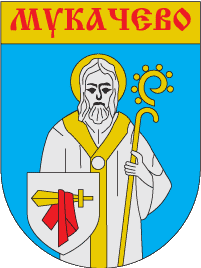
Mukachevo

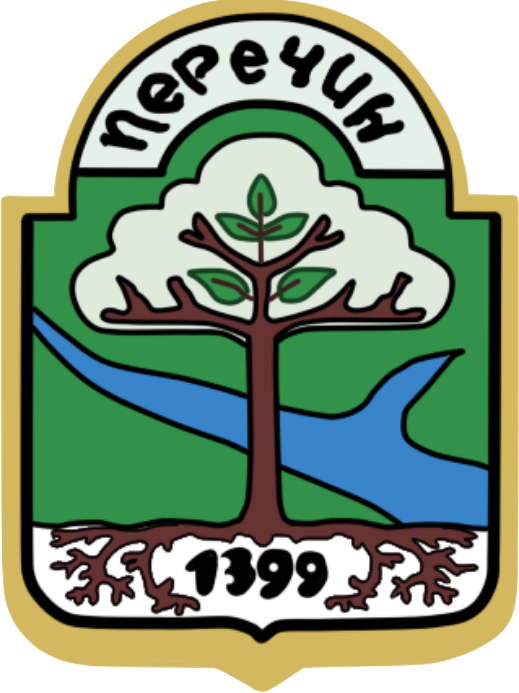
Perechyn

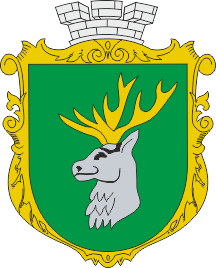
Rakhiv

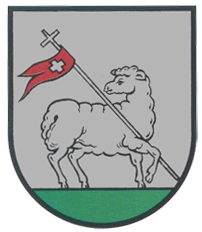
Serednie

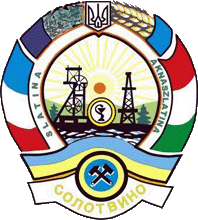
Solotvyno

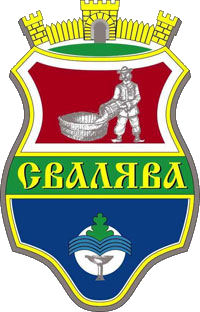
Svaliava

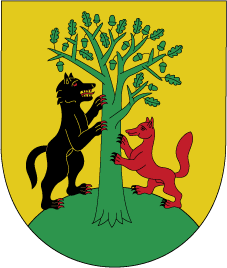
Teresva

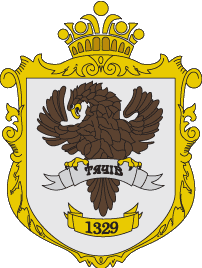
Tiachiv

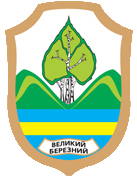
Velykyi Bereznyi

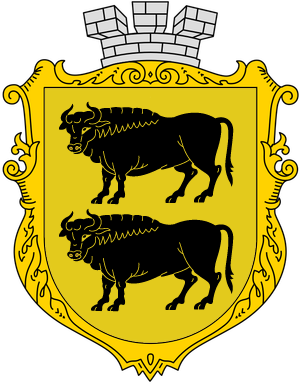
Velykyi Bychkiv

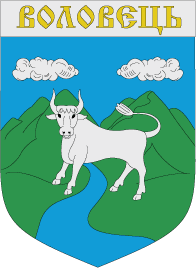
Volovets

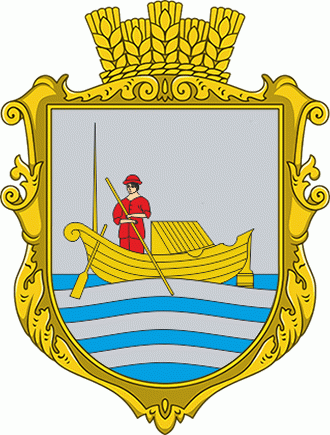
Vylok

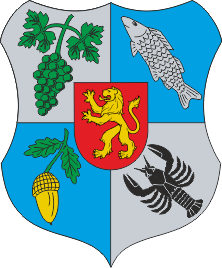
Vynohradiv

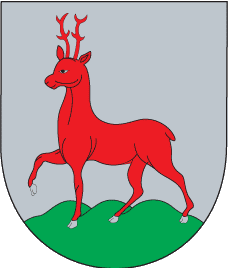
Vyshkovo

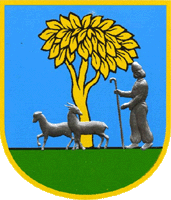
Yasinia

Berehove Raion

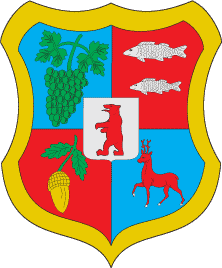
Irshava Raion

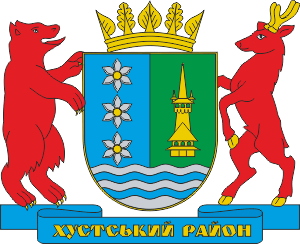
Khust Raion

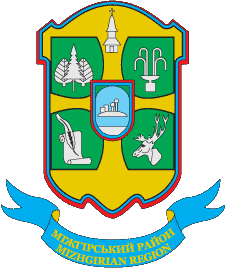
Mizhhiria Raion

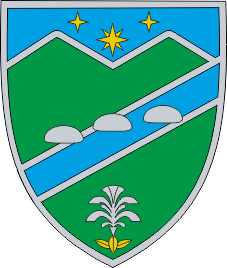
Mukachevo Raion

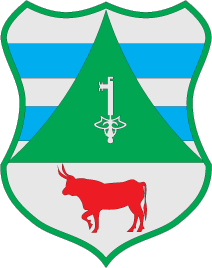
Perechyn Raion

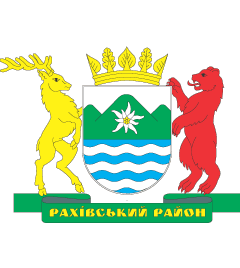
Rakhiv Raion

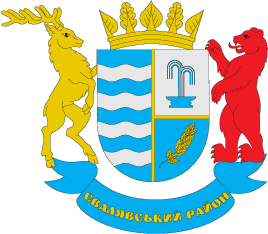
Svaliava Raion

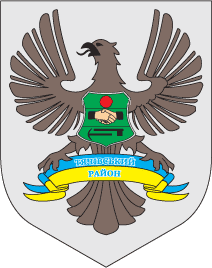
Tiachiv Raion

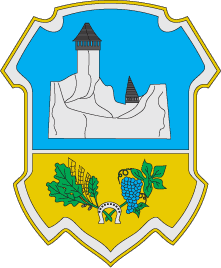
Uzhhorod Raion

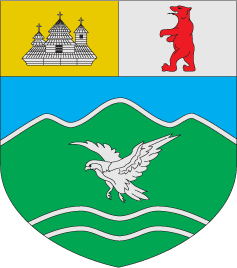
Velykyi Bereznyi Raion

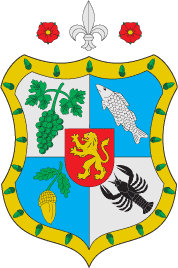
Vynohradiv Raion

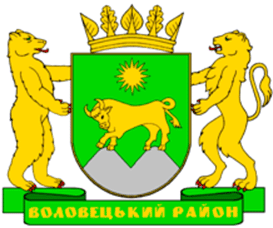
Volovets Raion

=== Zaporizhzhia Oblast ===
Zaporizhzhia

Berdiansk

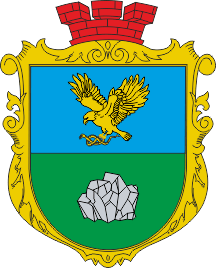
Kamianka

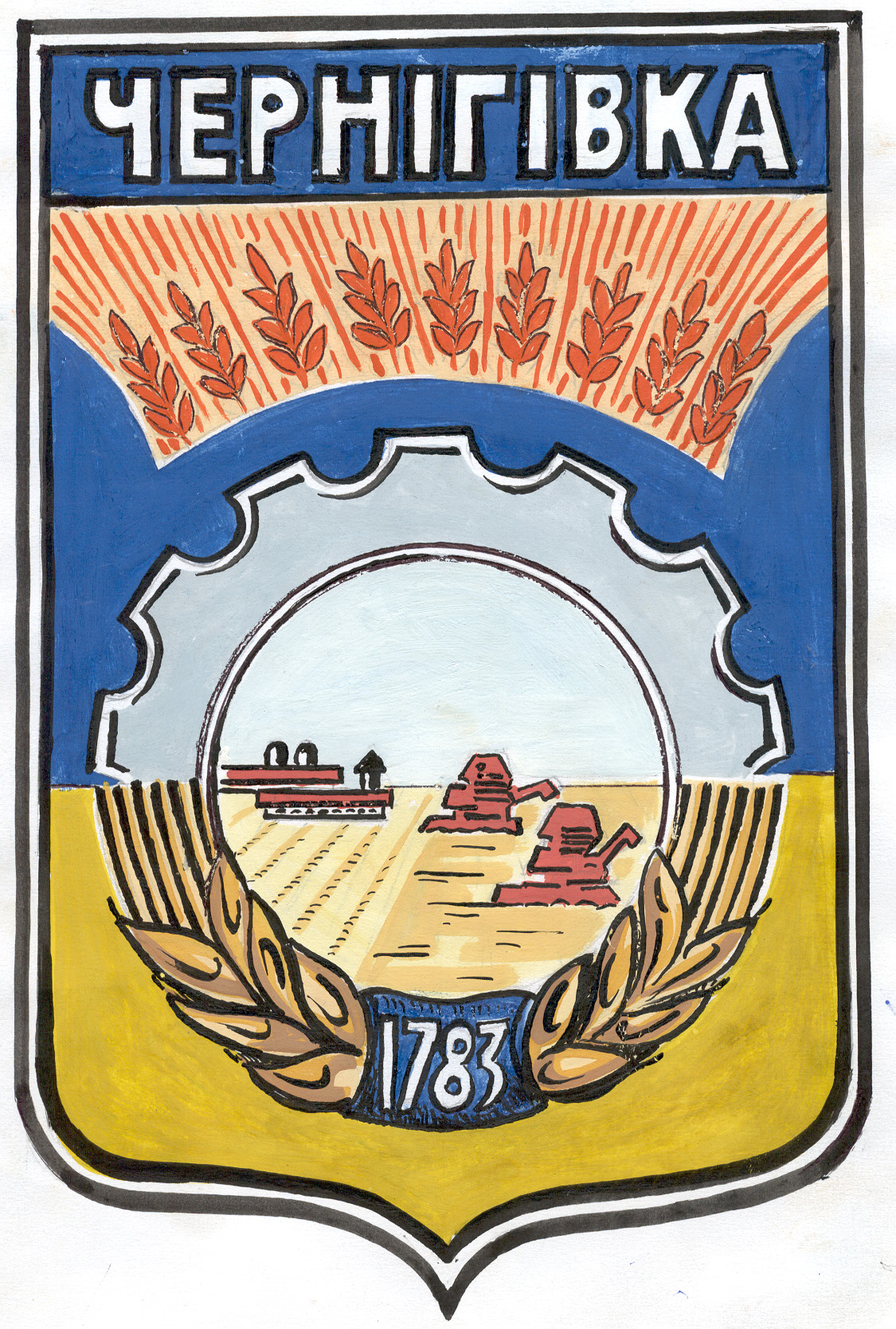
Chernihivka

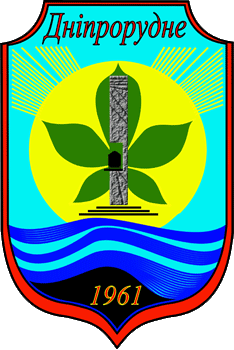
Dniprorudne

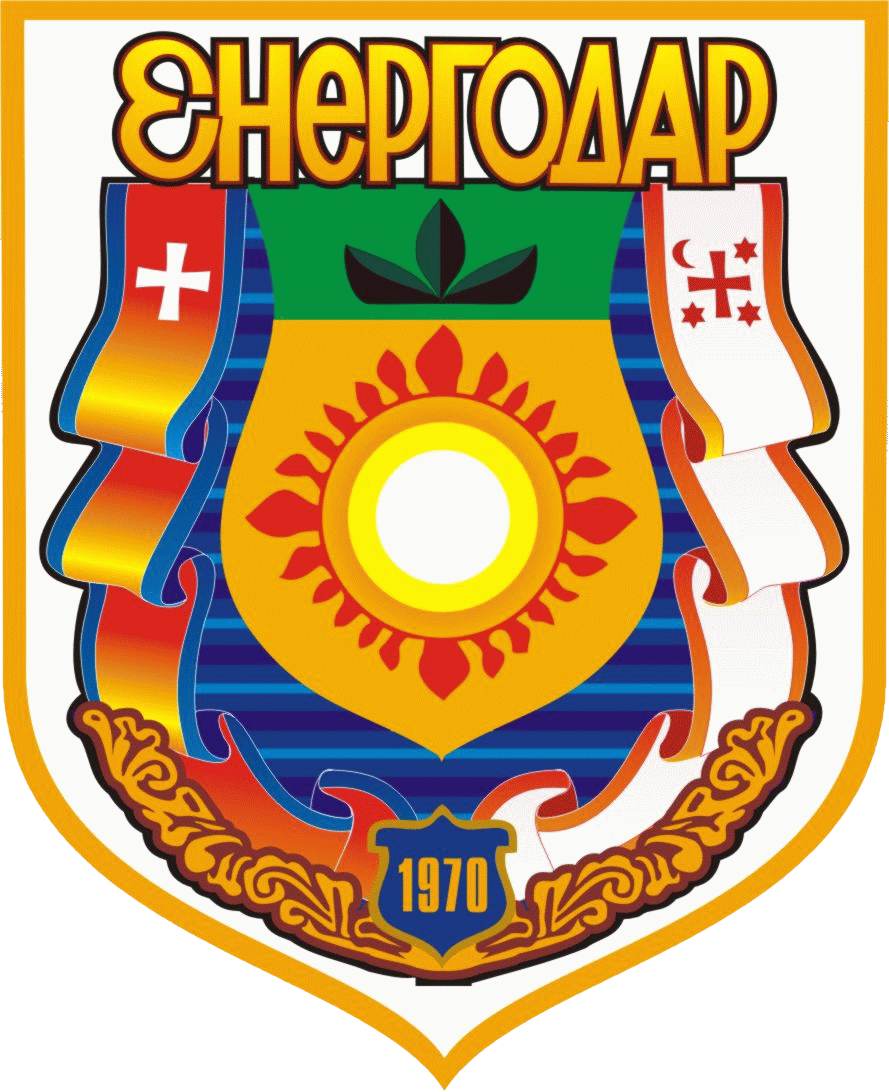
Enerhodar

Huliaipole

Kamianka-Dniprovska

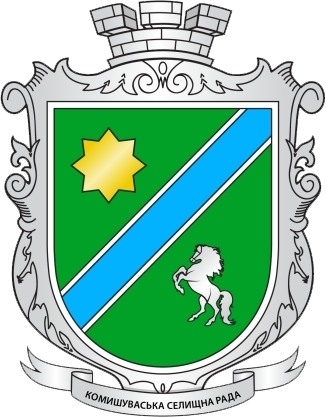
Komyshuvakha

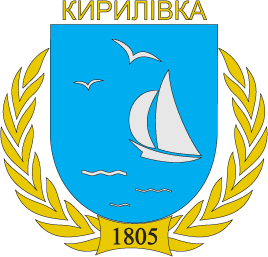
Kyrylivka

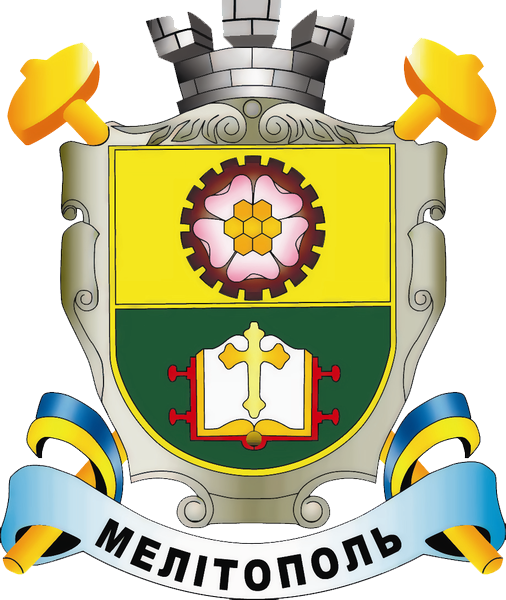
Melitopol

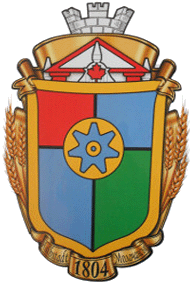
Molochansk

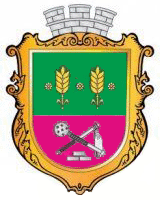
Mykhailivka

Orikhiv

Polohy

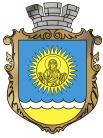
Pryazovske

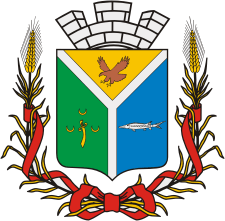
Prymorsk

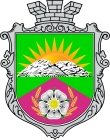
Rozivka

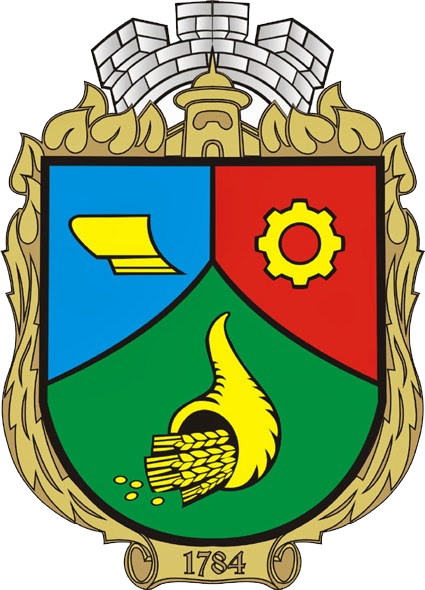
Tokmak

Vasylivka

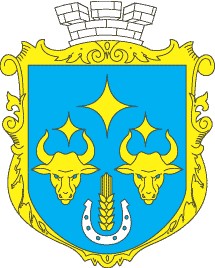
Vesele

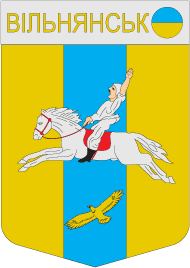
Vilniansk

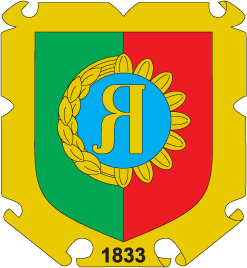
Yakymivka

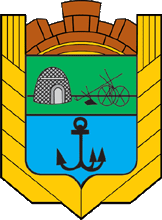
Berdiansk Raion

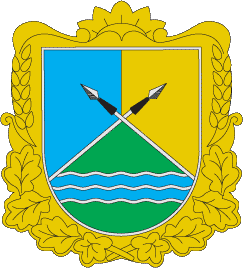
Bilmak Raion

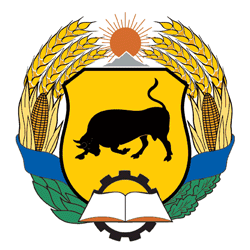
Chernihivka Raion

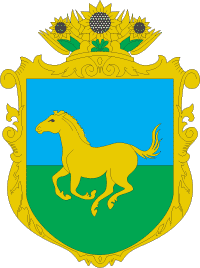
Huliaipole Raion

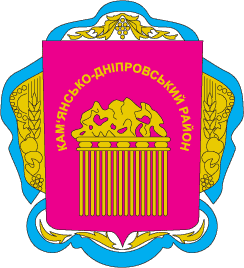
Kamianka-Dniprovska Raion

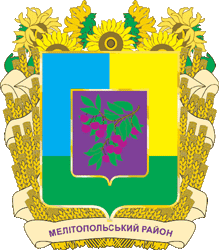
Melitopol Raion

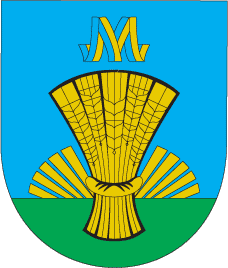
Mykhailivka Raion

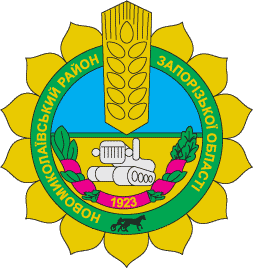
Novomykolaivka Raion

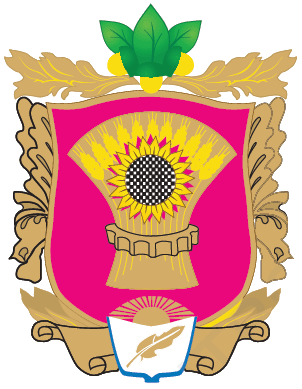
Orikhiv Raion

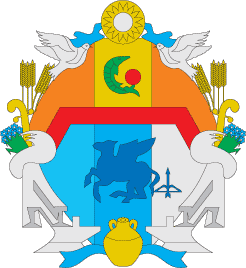
Polohy Raion

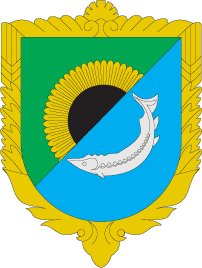
Pryazovske Raion

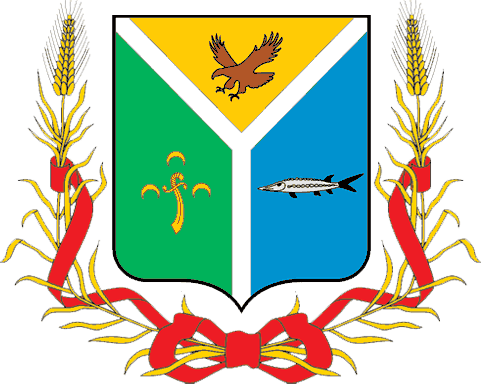
Prymorsk Raion

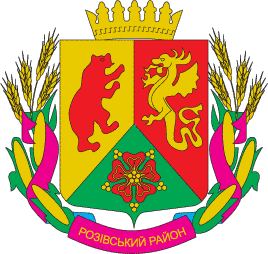
Rozivka Raion

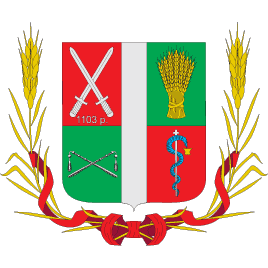
Tokmak Raion

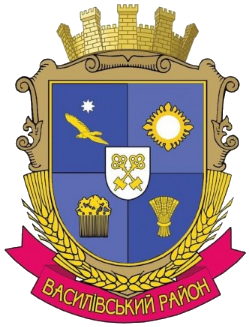
Vasylivka Raion

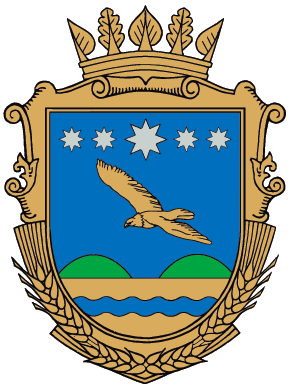
Velyka Bilozerka Raion

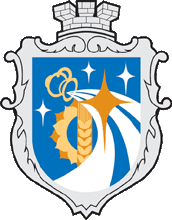
Vesele Raion

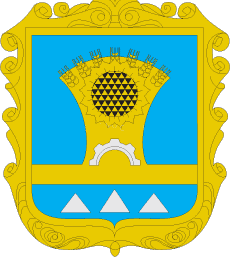
Vilniansk Raion

Yakymivka Raion

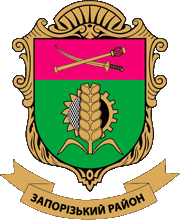
Zaporizhzhia Raion

=== Zhytomyr Oblast ===
Zhytomyr

Andrushivka

Berdychiv

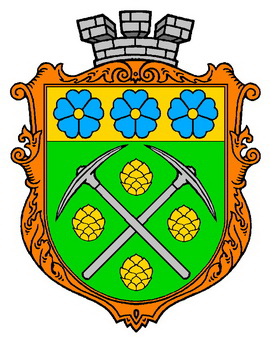
Cherniakhiv

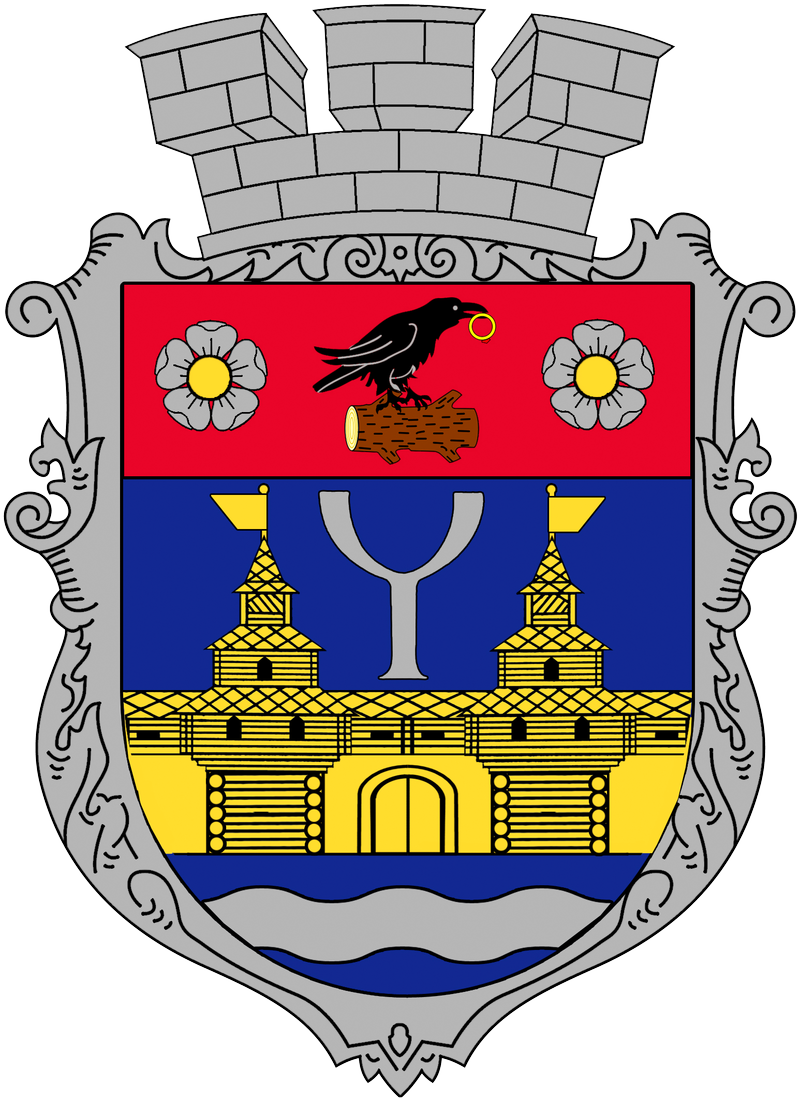
Chopovychi

Chudniv

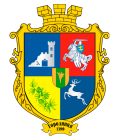
Horodnytsia

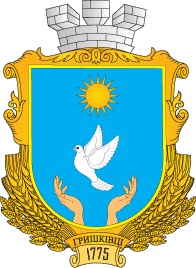
Hryshkivtsi

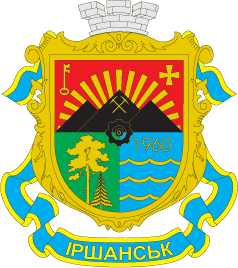
Irshansk

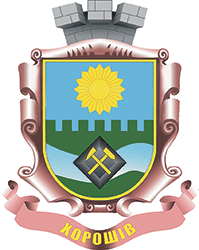
Khoroshiv

Korostyshiv

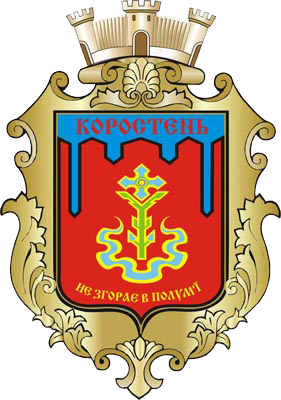
Korosten

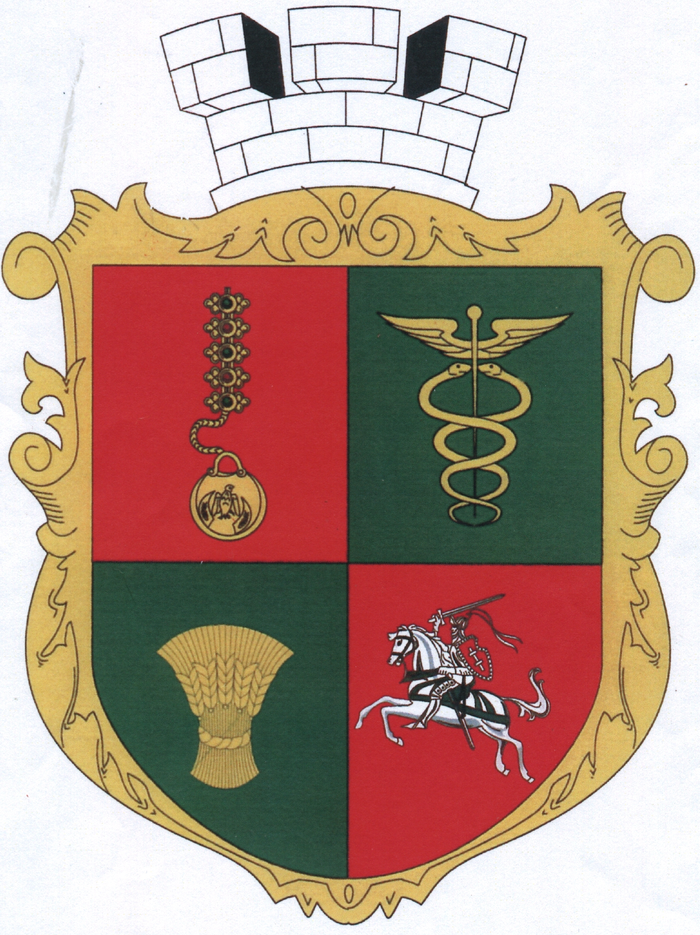
Liubar

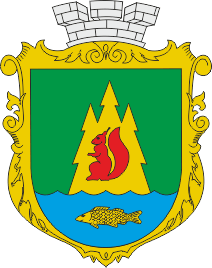
Luhyny

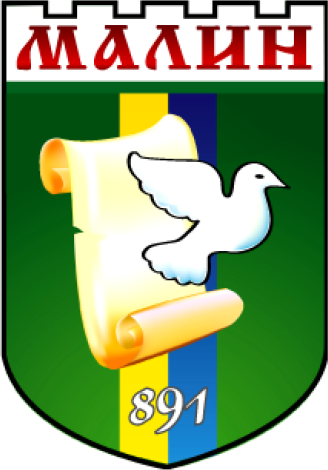
Malyn

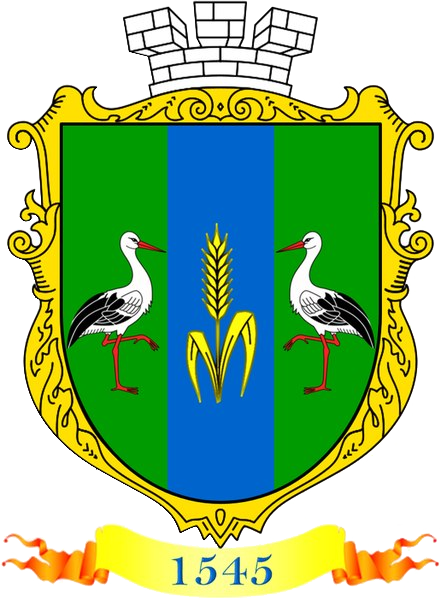
Narodychi

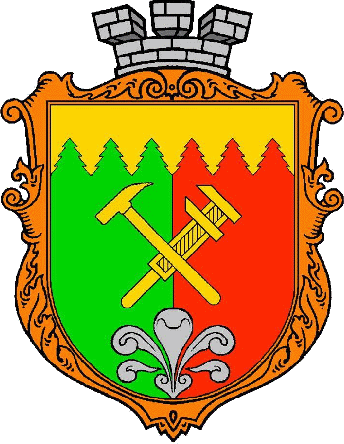
Nova Borova

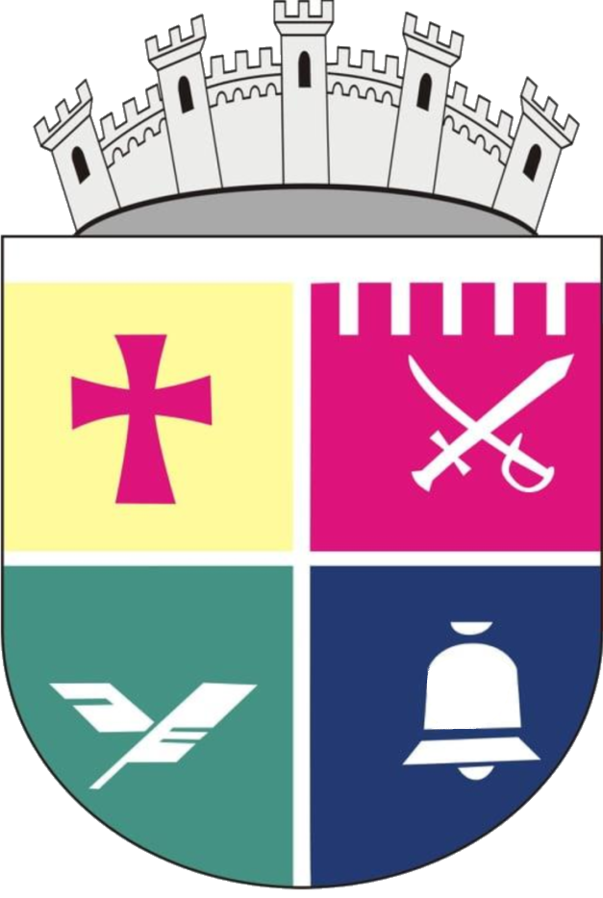
Zviahel

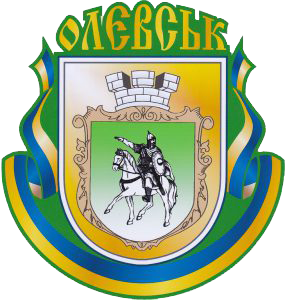
Olevsk

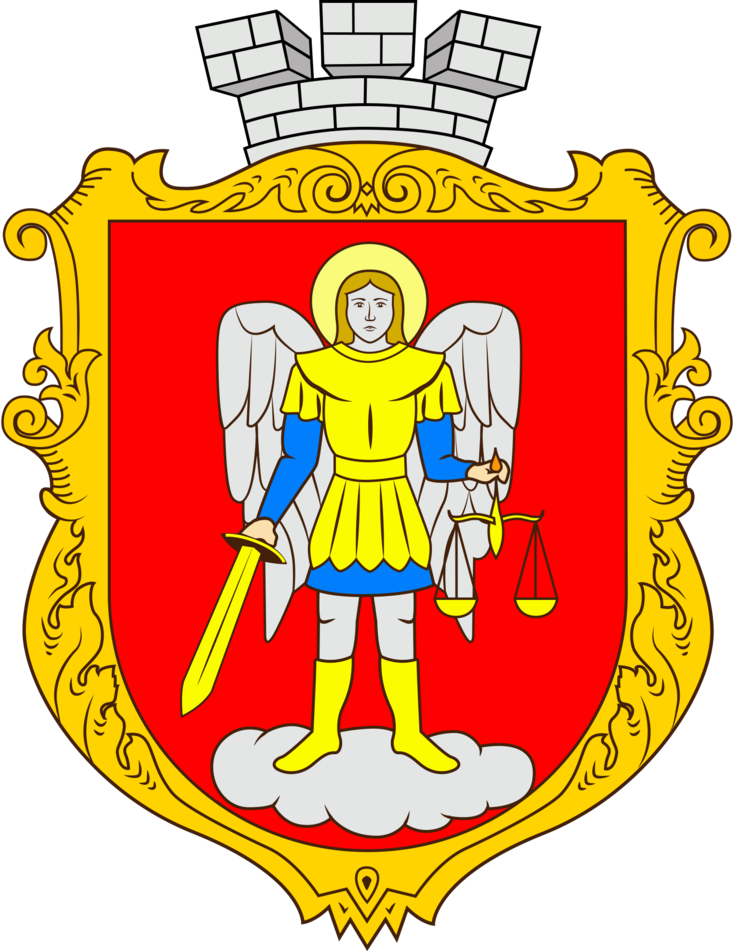
Ovruch

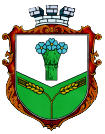
Pulyny

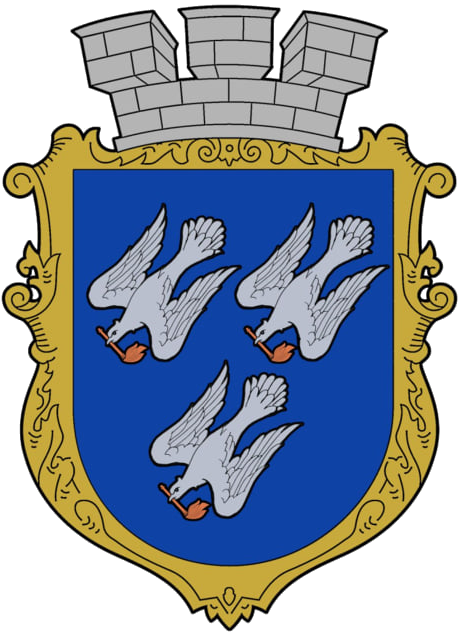
Radomyshl

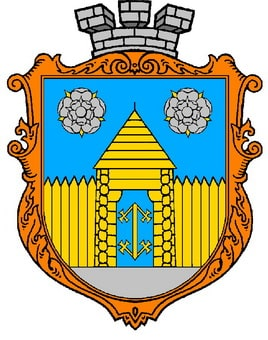
Ruzhyn

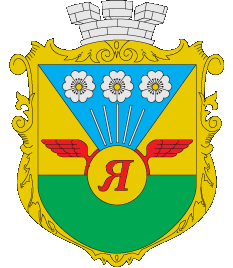
Yablunets

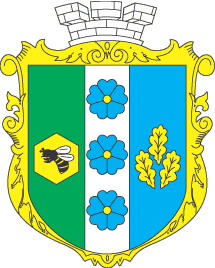
Yemilchyne

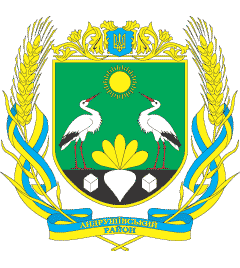
Andrushivka Raion

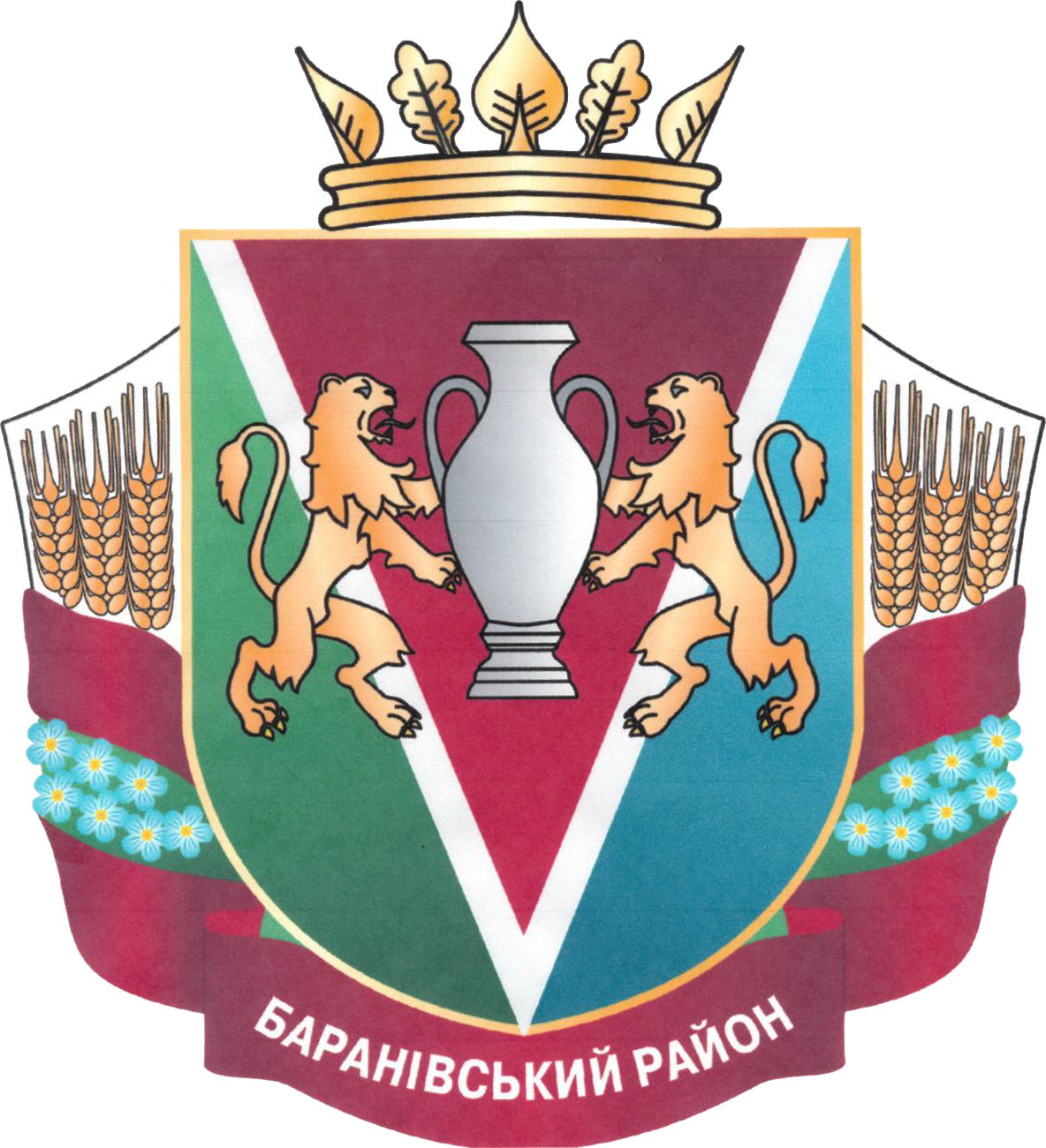
Baranivka Raion

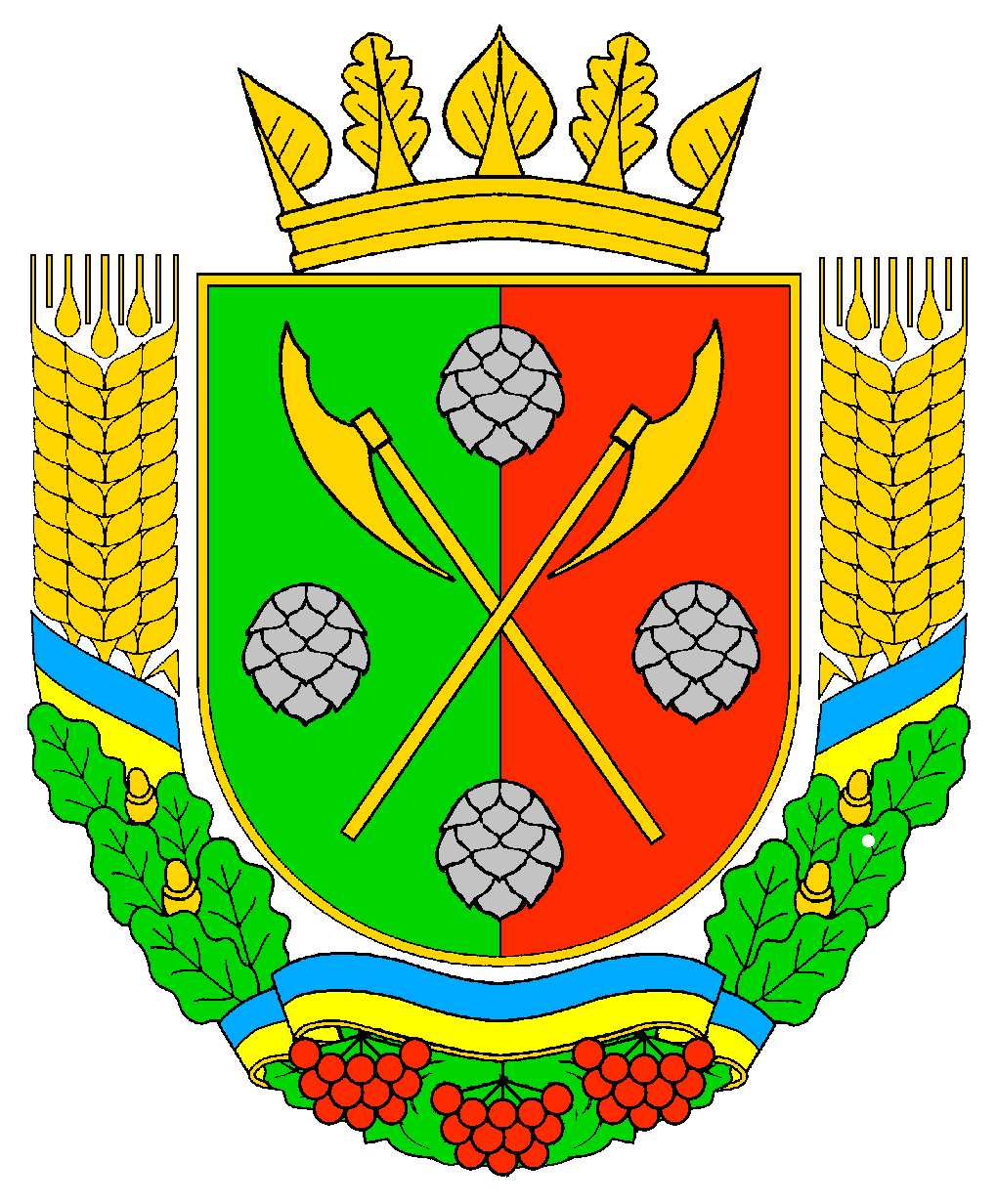
Berdychiv Raion

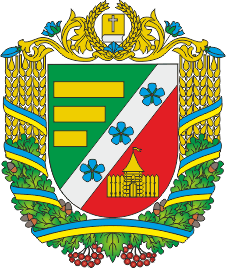
Brusyliv Raion

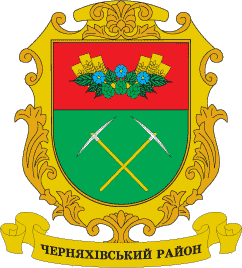
Cherniakhiv Raion

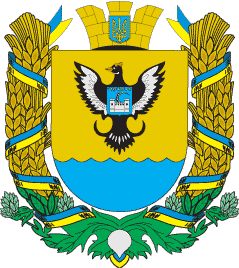
Chudniv Raion

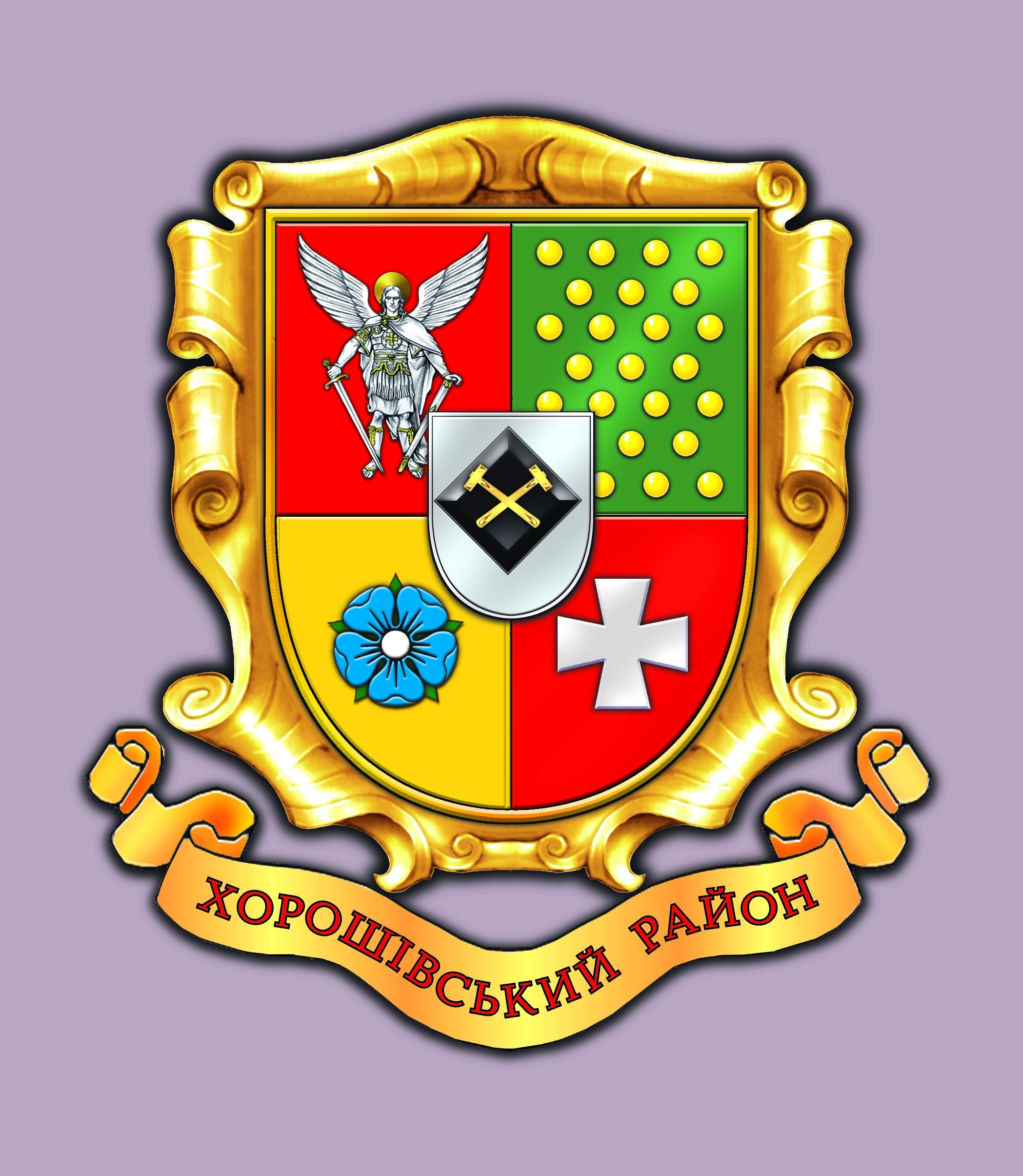
Khoroshiv Raion

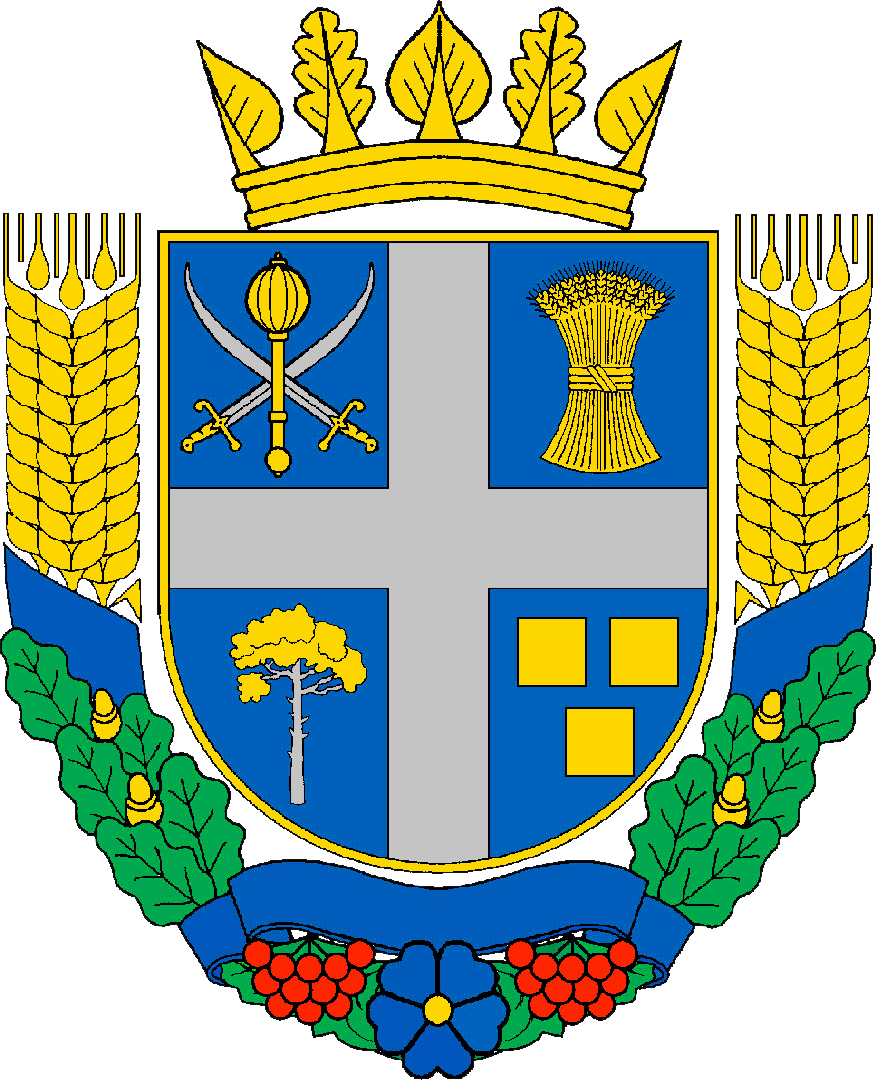
Korosten Raion

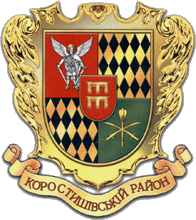
Korostyshiv Raion

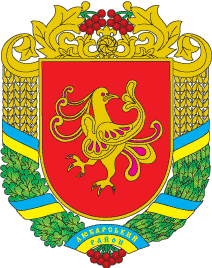
Liubar Raion

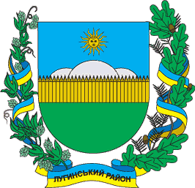
Luhyny Raion

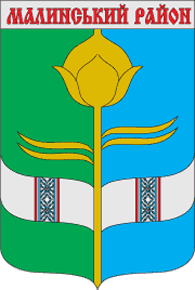
Malyn Raion

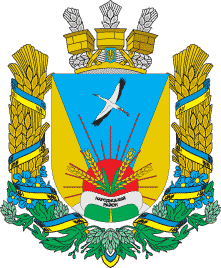
Narodychi Raion

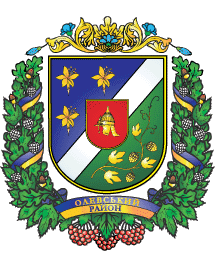
Olevsk Raion

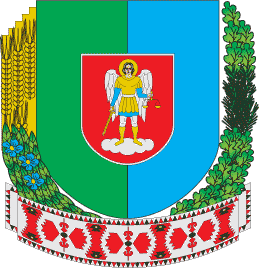
Ovruch Raion

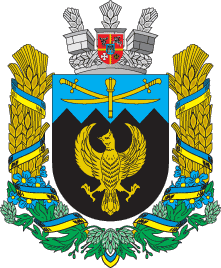
Popilnia Raion

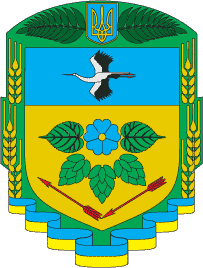
Pulyny Raion

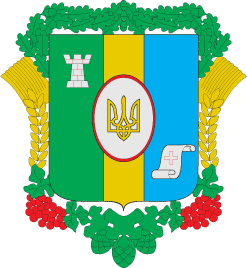
Radomyshl Raion

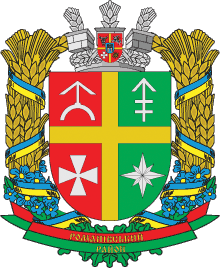
Romaniv Raion

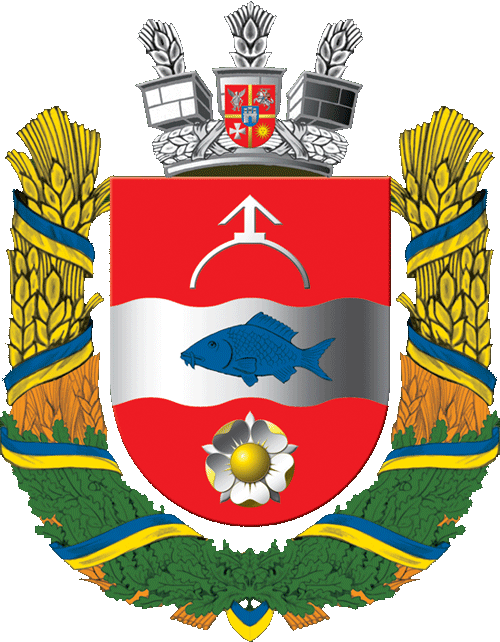
Ruzhyn Raion

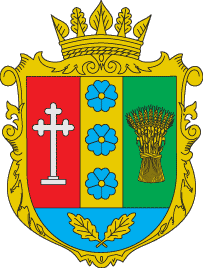
Yemilchyne Raion

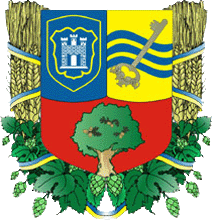
Zhytomyr Raion

Zviahel Raion

== See also ==
- Administrative divisions of Ukraine
- Coat of arms of Ukraine
- Flags of the regions of Ukraine
