= Holohory-Kremenets Ridge =

Holohory-Kremenets Ridge (Ukrainian: Гологірсько-Крем’янецький східець) forms the northwestern part of the Podolian Upland. With an elevation of 350-470 meters and a length of up to 250 kilometers, the ridge's northern side falls steeply into the depression formed by the Buh, Styr, Ikva and Horyn rivers, with the altitude difference reaching 150-200 meters. Of partially tectonical origin, as a result of massive erosion the ridge is distinguished by numerous mesas dissected by river valleys, gullies and ravines. The ridge's lower parts consist of chalk covered by miocenic sandstones. As a result of abundant rainfall in the area, it is covered with numerous forests.

== Constituent parts ==
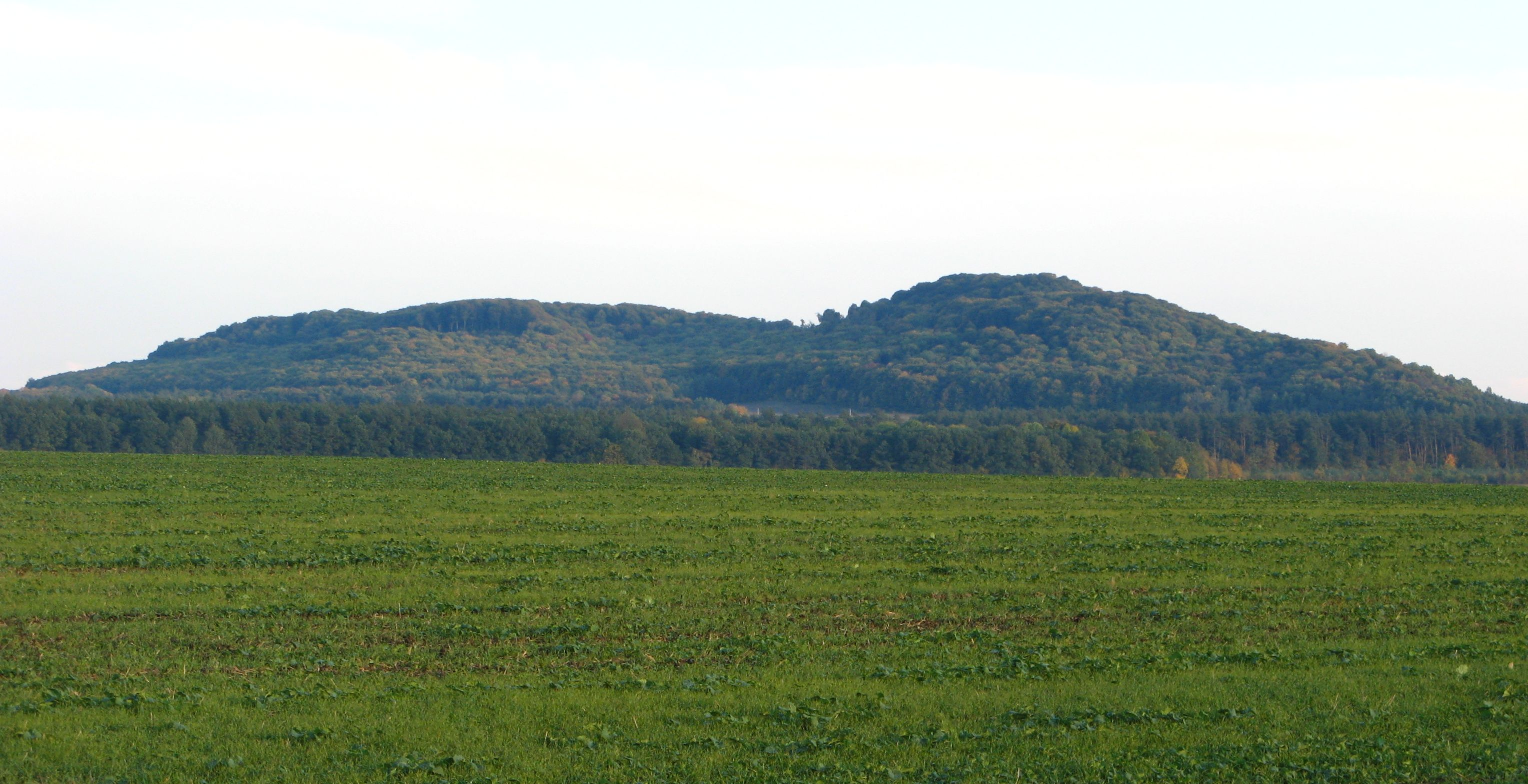
"Holy Mountain" in Voroniaky

The ridge is divided into three parts:

- Holohory (western part spanning from Lviv to Zolochiv);
- Voroniaky (central part from Zolochiv to Ikva);
- Kremenets Mountains (from Ikva to Horyn).

== Sources ==
- Holohory-Kremenets Ridge in Encyclopedia of Ukraine
