= Voroniaky =

Mountain in Ukraine

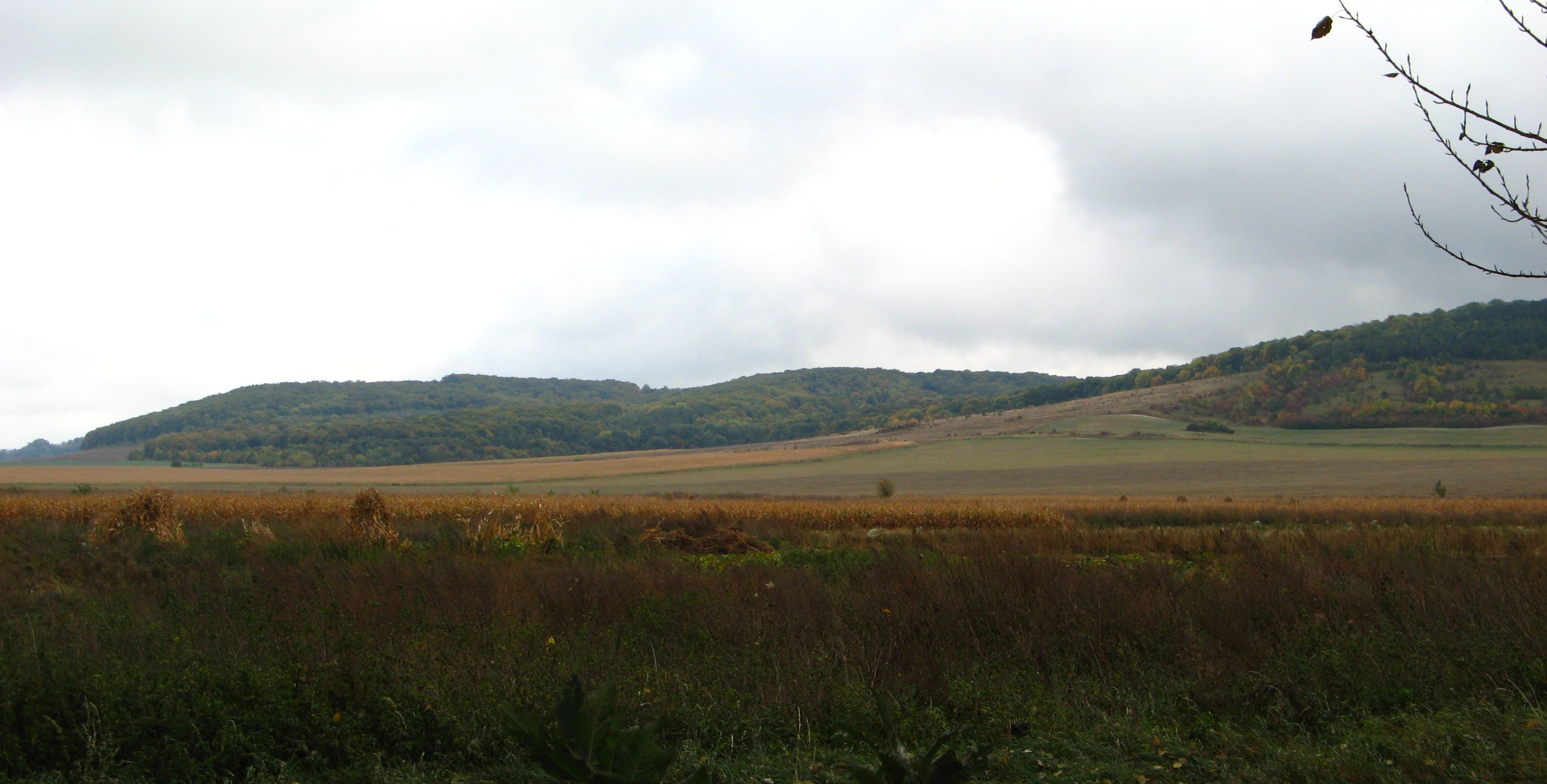
Voroniaky

Voroniaky (Ukrainian: Вороняки) is a geographical area on the northern edge of Podolian Upland, part of the Holohory-Kremenets Ridge. It is located between the city of Zolochiv and river Ikva. The massive's heights vary from 350 metres (1,150 ft) to 467 metres (1,532 ft) above sea level, and it is divided by numerous rivers forming the basins of Buh, Styr and Ikva.
