= Little Polesia =

Lowland area of Ukraine

Map of Ukrainian Polesia, with Little Polesia marked yellow on the lower left

Little Polesia or Little Polissia (Ukrainian: Мале Полісся) is a lowland area located between the Volhynian Upland in the north, Podolian Upland in the south, Roztochchia in the west and Polesian Lowland in the east. It serves as a part of Ukraine's forest belt, which covers approximately 100,000 sq km in total.

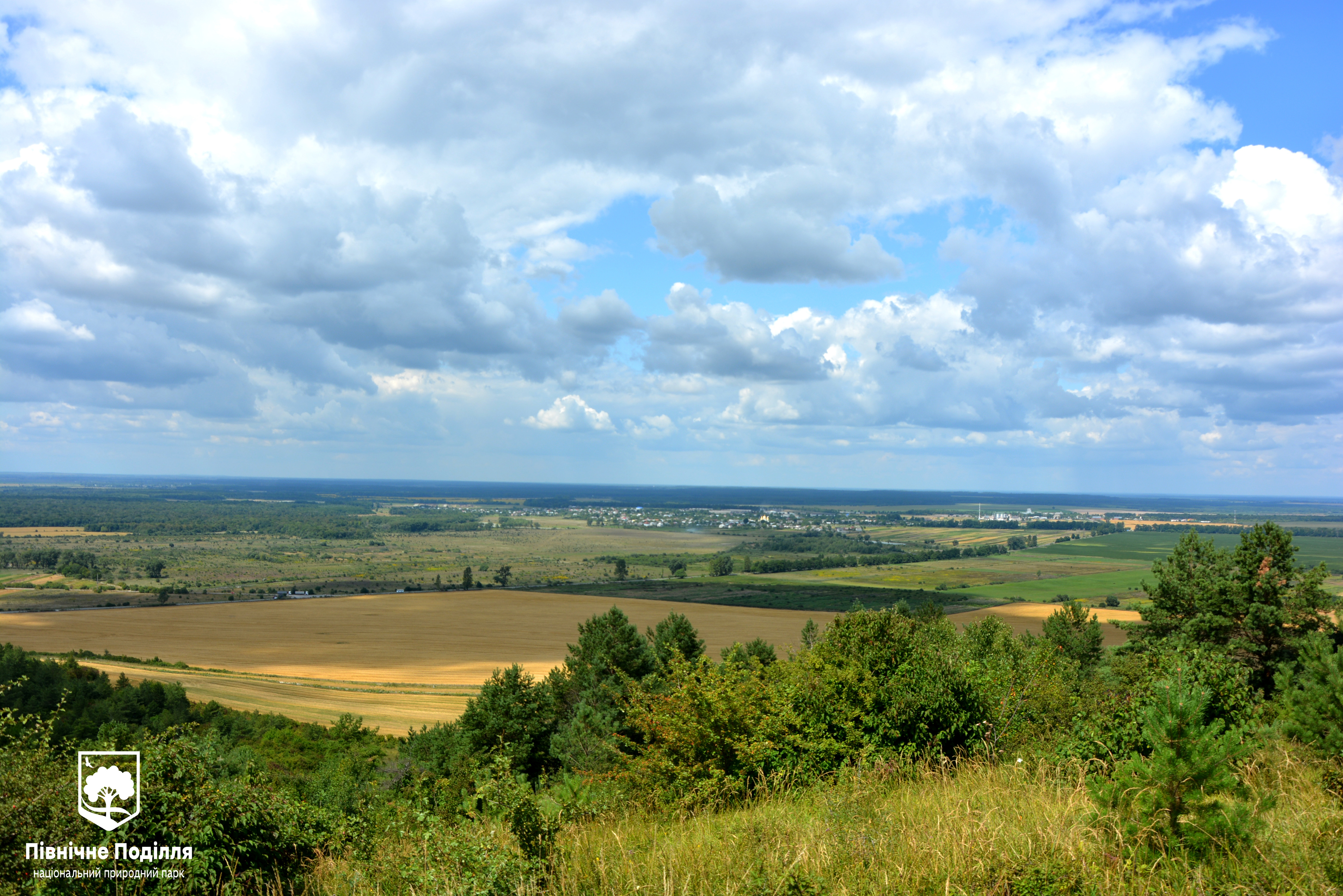
View on Little Polesia from Northern Podillia National Nature Park in Lviv Oblast

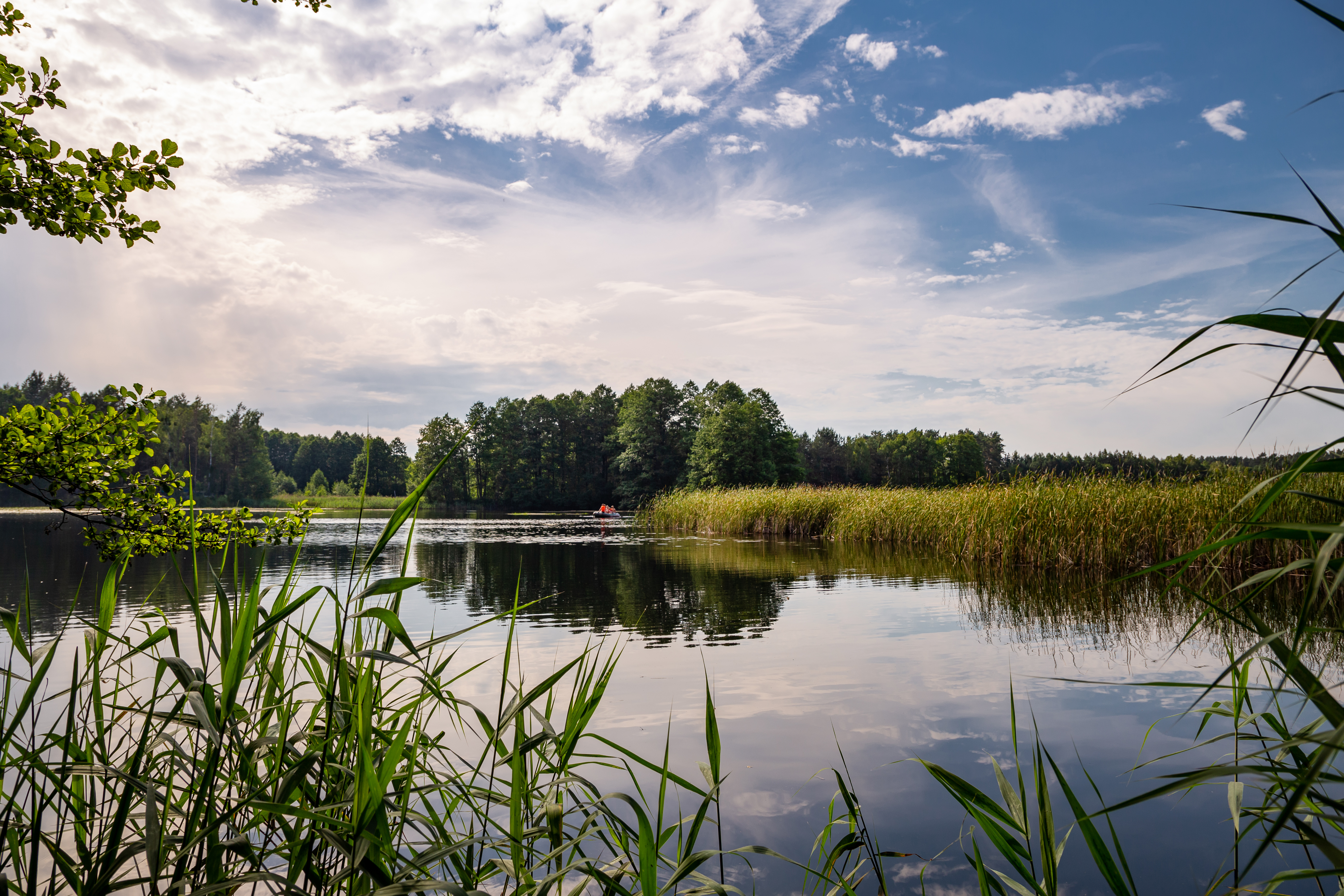
A landscape of Little Polesia in the northern Khmelnytskyi Oblast

== Geological history ==
Little Polesia is characterized by the presence of alluvial outwash and glacial deposits covering the Upper Cretaceous marl base. The geographical area likely formed during the Pliocenic era under the effects of the eastward flow of melting waters from a glacier, which penetrated into the region through the valley of Buh. Following the glacier's retreat, the rivers Buh, Styr, Ikva, Viliya and Horyn started flowing northwards, creating a number of depressions divided by shallow watersheds.

== Geography ==
The region's southern southern border is limited by the uplands of Roztochchia and Podolia, which create a steep edge with the height of 70-150 meters along the line Rava-Ruska-Zhovkva-Lviv-Pidyarkiv-Olesko-Kremenets-Kuniv-Shepetivka. In the north, the lowland is separated from the Volhynian Upland by a ledge with the heights of 40-60 meters along the line Uhniv-Sheptytskyi-Berestechko-Verba-Ostroh-Krupets. The region of Little Polesia has a length of 300 kilometers, and its width fluctuates from 40-70 kilometers in the west (Buh Depression) to less than 5 kilometers near Ostroh in the east.

The landscape of the area is represented with outwash plains and moraines (in the western part), as well as loess areas, with the heights of 190-270 meters above sea level. Little Polesia is covered by a relatively small number of slow-flowing rivers with swampy floodplains. Local earths are of podzol and meadow-swamp varieties. In the eastern part of the region there are numerous mires, pine barrens and sand dunes, which created a landscape similar to the nearby Polesia.

== Nature and human settlement ==
The local flora is represented by pine, birch, oak, aspen and hornbeam forests, which cover 30% of the total territory. Hay fields and pastures take over a quarter of the area, and 40% of the land is cultivated, with agriculture being the main occupation of local population. Population density is approximately 50 inhabitants per sq km. Major cities are located on the edge of the region, with only exception being the Buh Depression in its western part.
