= Volhynian-Podolian Upland =

System of uplands in West Ukraine, part of East European plain

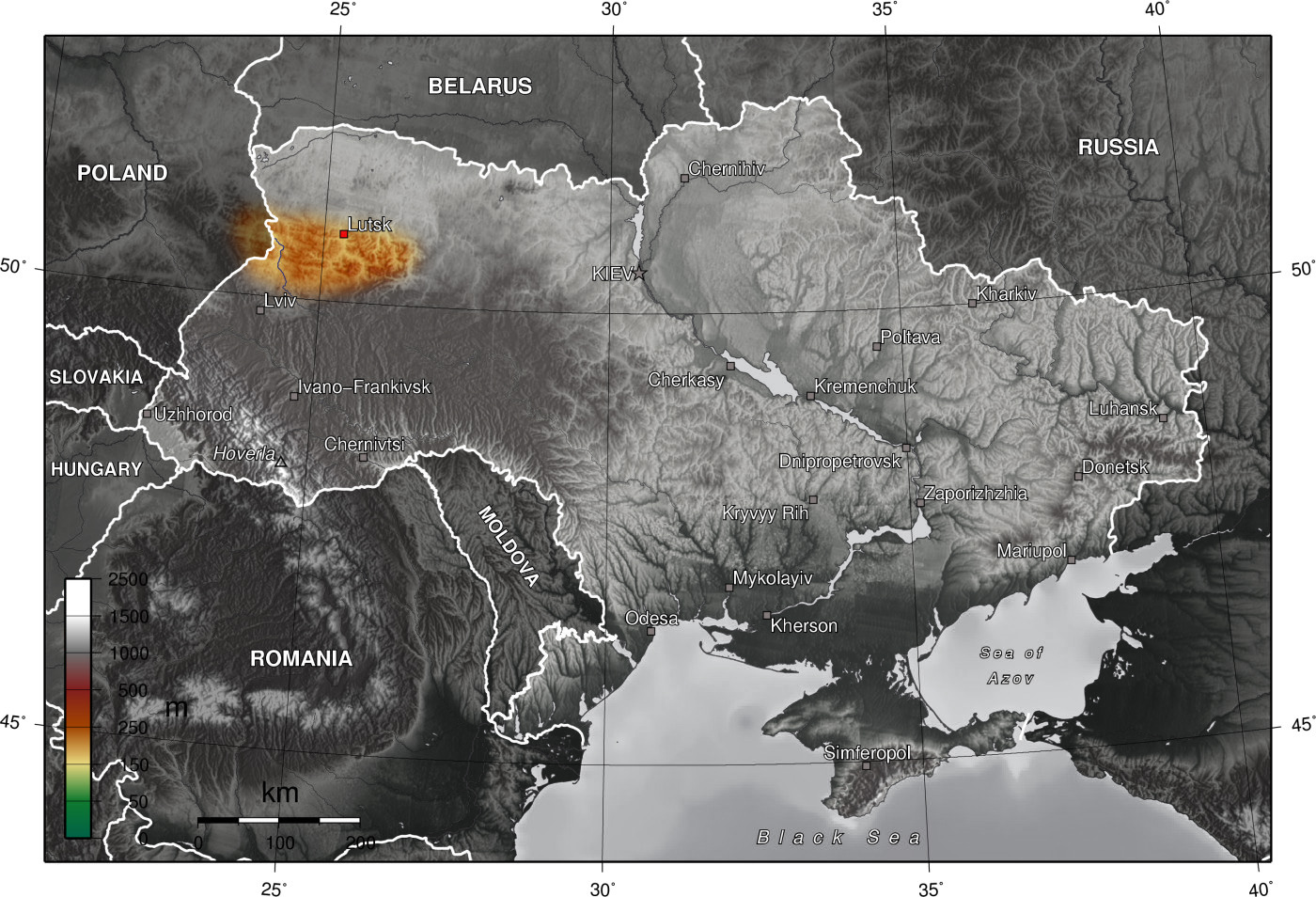
Volhynian Upland

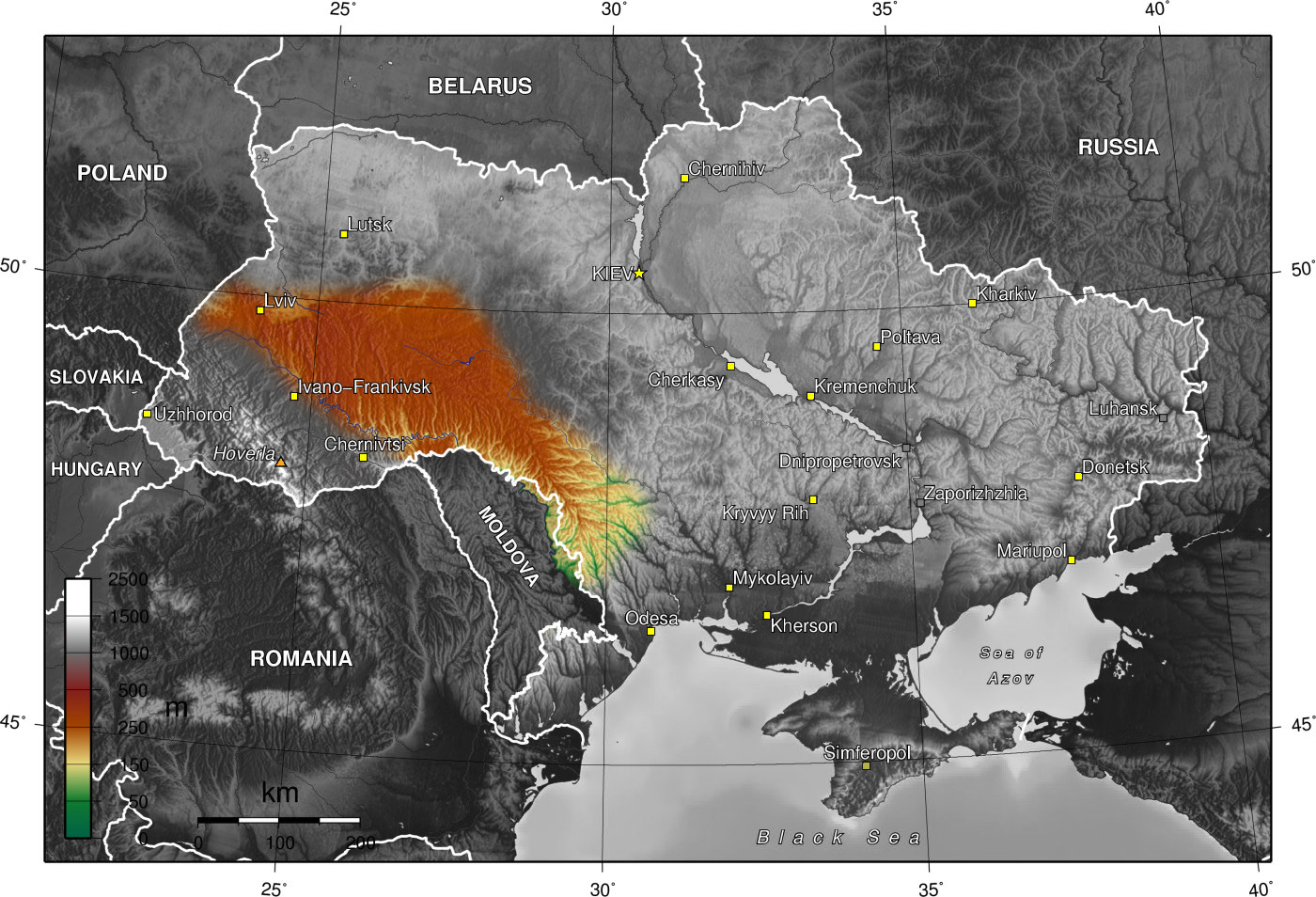
Podillia Upland

Main regions of Volhynian-Podolian Upland

The Volhynian-Podolian Upland (Ukrainian: Волинсько-Подільська височина) is a system of uplands in West Ukraine and right-bank Ukraine.

The upland includes:

- Podillia Upland
  - Opillia Upland
  - Lviv Plateau
  - Holohory-Kremenets Ridge
    - Kremenets Hills
    - Holohory (Barren Hills)
    - Voroniaky
  - Tovtry
    - Medobory
    - Pruth-Dniester Tovtry
    - Murafa Tovtry
- Volhynia-Kholm Upland
  - Kholm Upland
  - Sokal Ridge
  - Bug Upland
  - Horokhiv Upland
  - Povcha Upland
  - Rivne Plateau
  - Hoshcha Plateau
  - Mizoch Ridge
  - Shepetivka Plain
- Little Polesia
  - Bug Depression
    - Ridged Bug Plain
  - Brody Plain
  - Ostroh Valley

Along with Roztochia Upland and Moldavian Plateau, the upland forms the Volhynian-Podolian Plate.
