= Avratyn Upland =

Upland in Ukraine

Coordinates: 49°40′30″N 26°17′53″E

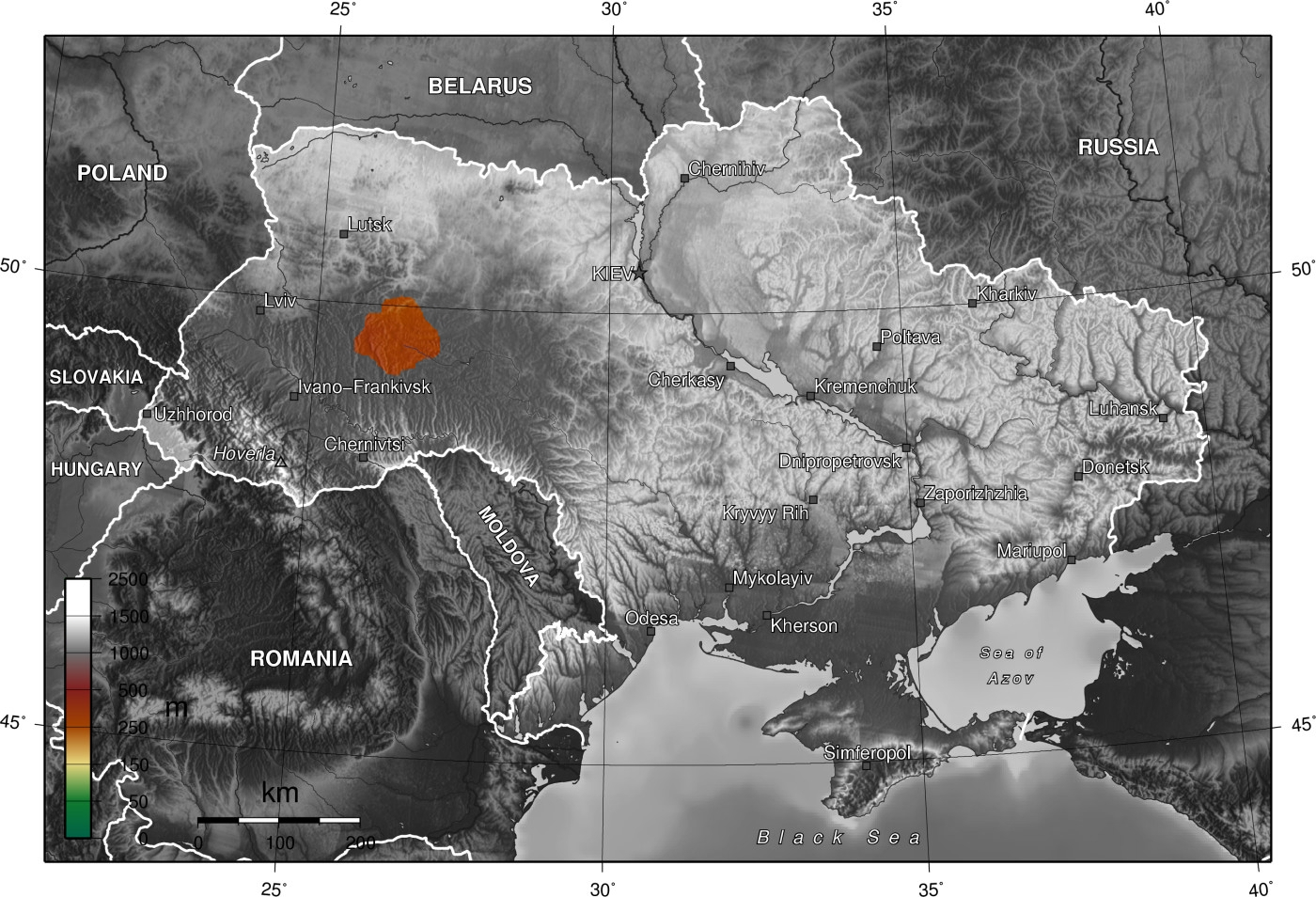
Avratyn Highland of the map of Ukraine

The Avratyn Upland (Ukrainian: Авратинська височина, Авратинське узгір’я) is an upland in Ukraine within the Podolian Upland. It is named after the village of Avratyn (Volochysk urban hromada). It serves as a watershed between the river basins of Dniester tributaries (Zbruch, Ushytsia) and Prypiat (Horyn). The name of the upland was introduced by Russian geographers during the first half of the 19th century and later spread by Aleksey Tillo to include the Volhynian and eastern part of Podolian Upland. With time the use of the term declined.
