= Buh Depression =

Geographic region of Ukraine

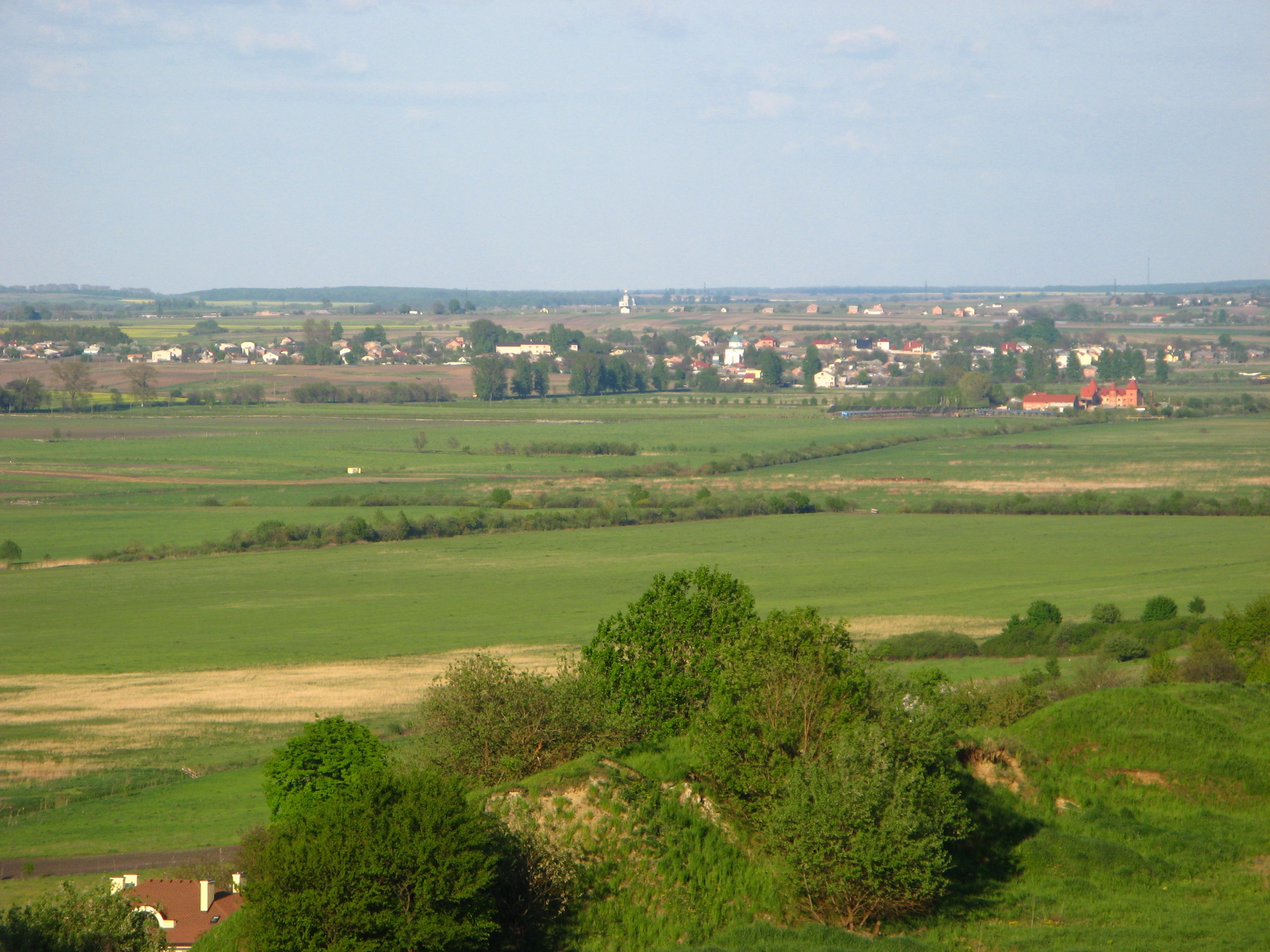
A landscape of the depression in the vicinity of Zhovkva

Buh Depression (Ukrainian: Надбужанська котловина) is a depression on the upper flow of Buh river, forming the western part of Little Polesia geographical region of Ukraine.

== Geography and geology ==
It forms a triangle bordered by the Roztochchia Upland in the southwest, Podolian Upland in the southeast and Volhynia-Chełm Upland in the north. The depression is of tectonic-erosive origin. Its northern part is a moraine-sand or sand outwash plain with many sections covered with pine forest. The southwestern part consists of low, flat chalk hills oriented along the latitude, covered with loess and dissected by broad swampy hollows.

== Sources ==
- Buh Depression in Encyclopedia of Ukraine
