= Kremenets Mountains National Nature Park =

National park in Ukraine

- Ukrainian: Національний природний парк «Кременецькі гори»
- IUCN category II (national park)
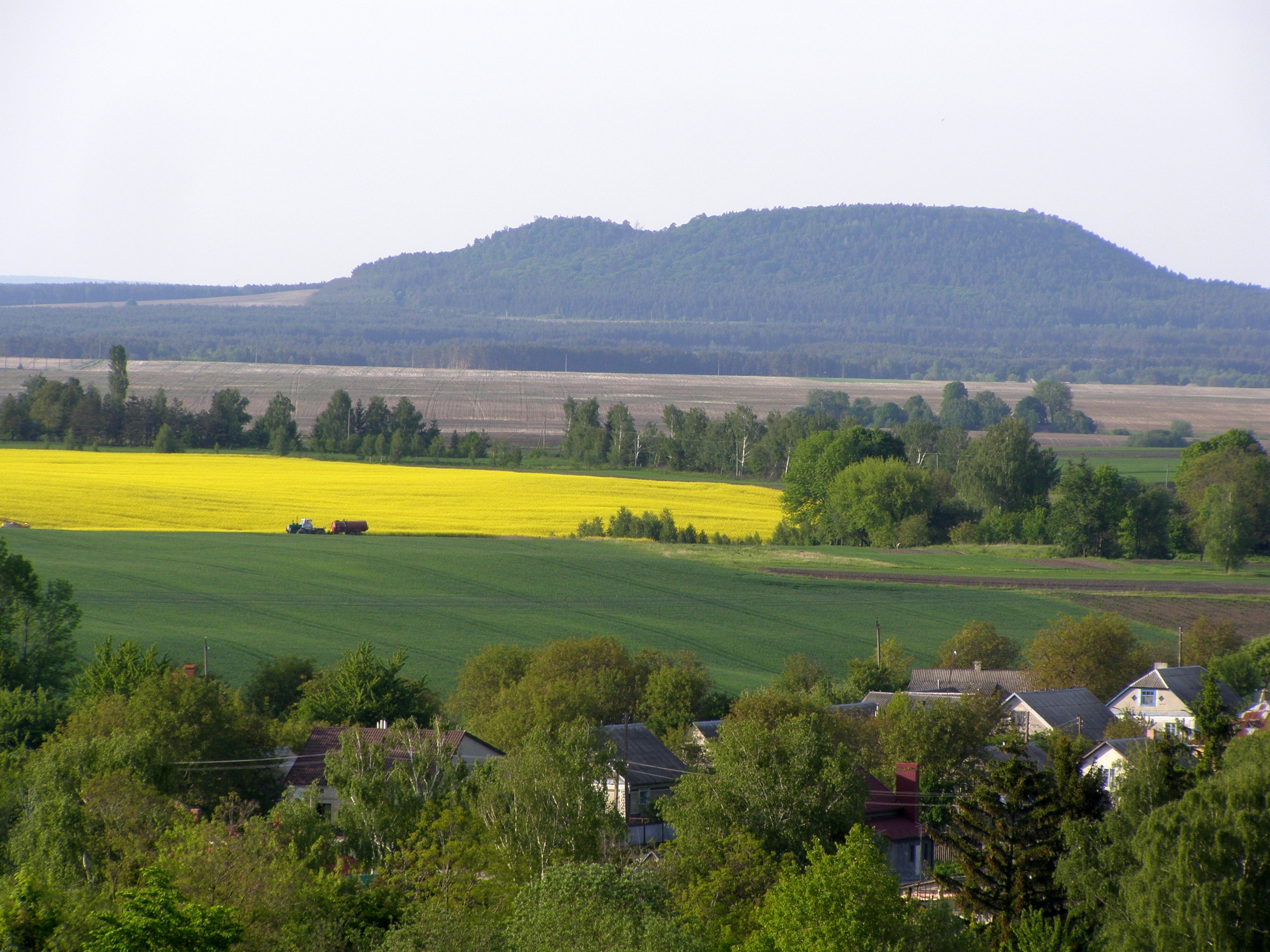
- Kremenets Mountains National Park

- Location within Ukraine
- Location: Ternopil Oblast
- Nearest city: Kremenets
- Coordinates: 50°09′21″N 25°50′23″E
- Area: 16,215 hectares (40,068 acres; 162 km^{2}; 63 sq mi)
- Established: 1999
- Governing body: Ministry of Ecology and Natural Resources (Ukraine)
- Website: http://kremgory.in.ua/

The Kremenets Mountains National Nature Park (Ukrainian: Національний природний парк «Кременецькі гори», romanized: Kremenec'ki Hory) covers a cluster of mountains and ridges in the Holohory-Kremenets Ridge of the Podolian Upland in west central Ukraine. Administratively, the national park is in Kremenets Raion in Ternopil Oblast.

== Topography ==
The mountains of the park's name are the southeastern third of the Holohory-Kremenetsk Ridge, which stretches 170 km across the west of Ukraine. They consist of highly eroded hills of chalk, clay and limestone. The terrain is one of low ridges and plateaus cut by ravines, river and stream valleys, and gullies. On the northern slopes, the mountains drop at a steep incline to the valley of the Little Polisia plains. Rocky outcrops of chalk and marl form terraces and ledges. Individual hills are separated from others where erosion has worn away lighter rock.

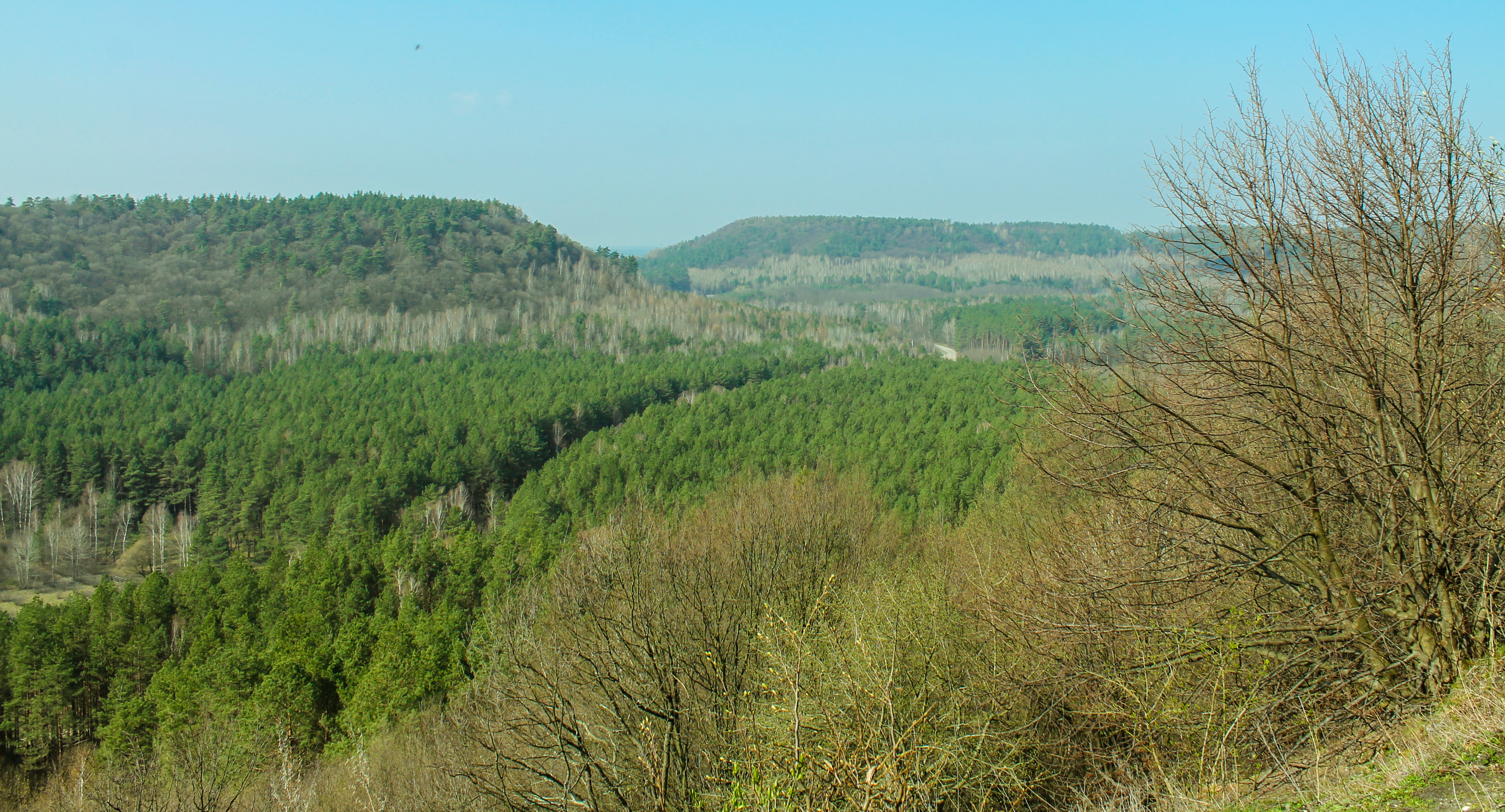
Danylova Mountain, one of the natural and cultural attractions in Kremenets Mountains National Nature Park

As with many Ukrainian National Parks, Kremenets Mountains was created to encompass a number of smaller protected areas, both natural and cultural. These subsidiary units usually retain their original legal structure. In Kremenets Mountains, these subsidiary units include:

- The Veselivka Botanical Reserve, an oak-hornbeam-ash forest over 100 years in age.
- The state-owned Dovzhok Botanical Preserve, a similar oak-hornbeam-ash forest.
- The locally owned Bila Krynytsia Zoological Reserve, protecting the reproduction and restoration of animals under pressure from hunting.
- The locally owned Volhynian Zoological Reserve, protecting hunted animals, as well as the locally vulnerable European badger
- "Słowacki's Rock" natural monument, a group of large limestone pillars, said to be a favorite visiting spot of Polish Poet Juliusz Słowacki
- Stizhok Mountain, a 357-meter-high (1,171 ft) geological monument, forming a conical mountain of chalk, marl, sand and limestone with a flat top.
- Danylova Mountain ('Mount Trinity'), on which still stands the Holy Trinity Church of the 12th century

Overall, the average ridge height is 100 – 200 meters above the surrounding territory, or 350 – 400 meters above sea level. At the base of the ridge is a layer of white chalk, which may be up to 100 meters thick. This is overlaid by a layer of sand, laid down by the Galician Sea 15-20 million years ago, over which are layers of sandstone and limestone. Over all is a layer of Quaternary yellow loess and loams, 10 – 30 meters thick.

== Climate and ecoregion ==
The climate of Kremenets is Humid continental climate, warm summer (Köppen climate classification (Dfb)). This climate is characterized by large swings in temperature, both diurnally and seasonally, with mild summers and cold, snowy winters. Kremenets is in the Central European mixed forests ecoregion.

== Flora and fauna ==
Kremenets Mountains exhibit the flora and fauna of the southern edge of the Central European mixed forests ecoregion, with some aspects of the northern Forest steppe. Forest types are predominantly oak, elm, and pine. Well developed agricultural fields surround the park on the plains. Biodiversity is high because the area is in the transition between marine and continental zones, as well as different geographic regions. Over 1,200 species of plants have been identified on the site, and 16 species are endemic to Kremenets Mountains.

The park protects the critically endangered species of birch tree, the Klokov birch (Betula klokovii), which grows on only two mountain tops, both in the Kremenets Mountains park.

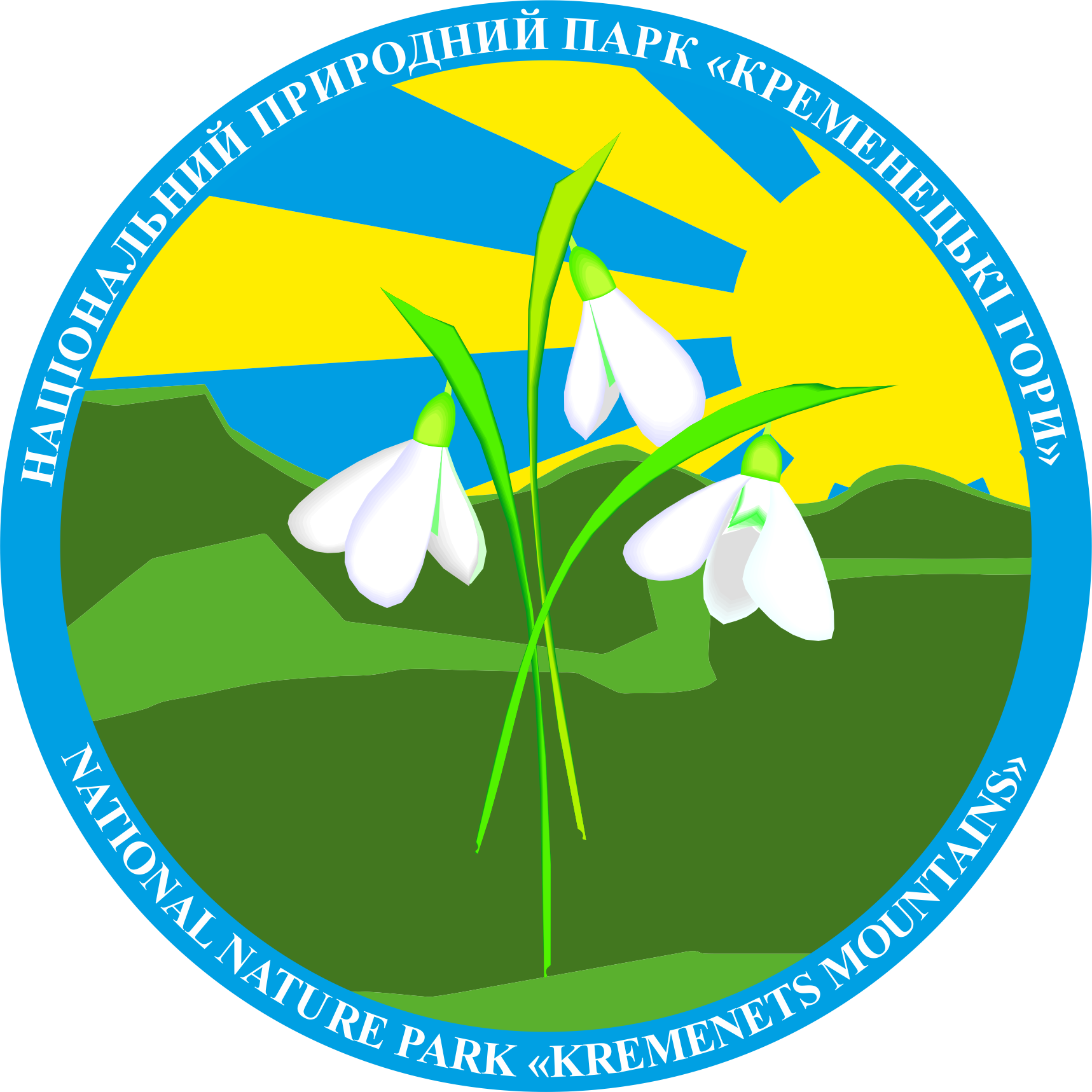
Park logo

== Public use ==
There are hiking trails open to the major natural and cultural sights. Scientists in the park conduct educational classes for the local schoolchildren.

== See also ==
- National Parks of Ukraine
