= Opillia =

Geographic region of Ukraine

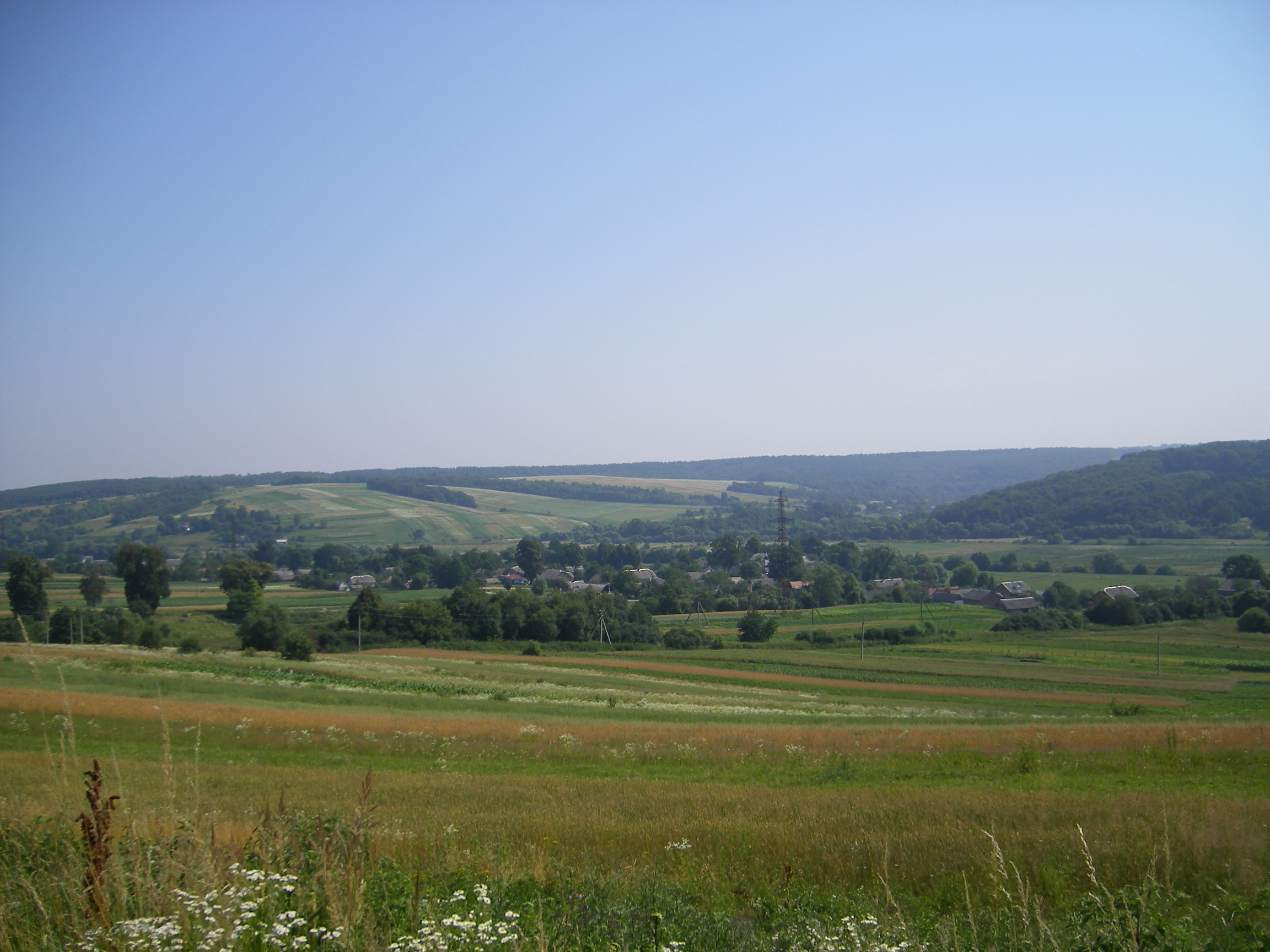
A typical landscape of Opillia in the vicinity of Mykolaiv, Lviv Oblast

Opillia (Ukrainian: Опілля, romanized: Opillia) is a geographic region of the Podolian Upland in Lviv Oblast, Ivano-Frankivsk Oblast and Ternopil Oblast in western Ukraine.

It is a western region of the Podillia Upland that stretches along the left bank of Dniester River and across valleys of Hnyla Lypa and Zolota Lypa rivers. Zolota Lypa approximately serves as an eastern boundary, while to its west is located the Sian-Dniester Divide Plain. The southern boundary of Opillia is created by Dniester, while to the north it reaches Lviv Plateau (Roztochia), Holohory, and Peremyshliany Highlands. Last two features are also part of the Podillia Upland region. The general elevation here is around 350–400 m (1,150–1,310 ft) and in contrast to the rest of Podillia landscape in the region is more smooth and gentle. The foundation of the upland consists of a soft chalky rock.

Beside the above-mentioned rivers, through the region flow such rivers like Zubra River, Svirzh River, and others. Their watersheds are cut by secondary valleys which provide the region with a hilly terrain. The slopes of the hills are covered with forests (generally beech, oak, and elm), and the watersheds with fields and meadows. Some of the larger towns in Opilia are Berezhany, Rohatyn, and Pidhaitsi.
