= Zbruch =

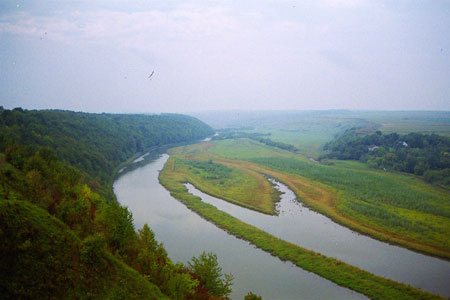

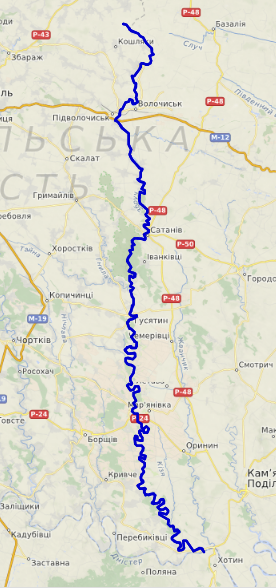
- Native name: Збруч (Ukrainian); Zbrucz (Polish)

Location
- Country: Ukraine

Physical characteristics
- Source
  - location: Shchasnivka, Ternopil Raion, Ternopil Oblast
  - coordinates: 49.7283°N 26.1658°E
- Mouth: Dniester
  - coordinates: 48.5391°N 26.4427°E
- Length: 244 km (152 mi)
- Basin size: 3,395 km^{2} (1,311 sq mi)

Basin features
- Progression: Dniester→ Dniester Estuary→ Black Sea
- Tributaries
  - left: Bovvanets, Hrabarka
  - right: Hnyla

The Zbruch (Ukrainian: Збруч; Polish: Zbrucz) is a river in Western Ukraine, a left tributary of the Dniester. Zbruch is the namesake of the Zbruch idol, a sculpture of a Slavic deity (9th century) in the form of a column with a head with four faces, discovered in 1848 by the river.

== Description ==
It flows within the Podolian Upland starting from the Avratyn Upland. Upon the river are situated a couple of small Hydro Electric Stations (Bodnariv's and Martynkiv's), while along the river are some 140 ponds. The river serves as a natural border between Ternopil and Khmelnytskyi regions. As it was mentioned above, the river flows through the Podolia Upland sneaking past the Podolian hills also known as Medobory for their honey-bearing flora (literally: Med - honey and Bory - forests). Along the river, there are recreational areas for swimming in the water. Medobory stretches from the northeastern part of the Lviv Region to the northern borders of the Republic of Moldova. The Zbruch, at its mouth, has a width of some 18 m (59 ft). The source of the river lies in relative proximity to other rivers such as the Horyn and the Sluch and used to serve as an alternative route for the tradeway "From the Varangians to Greeks". Presumably the earliest name for the river was Boruch.

The Zbruch had international significance following the first partition of Poland when between 1772 and 1793 the river was a border between Poland-Lithuania and Habsburg monarchy. After the second partition of Poland in 1793–1807 and 1815–1918 the river was a border between the Austrian Galicia on one side and Imperial Russia on the other. During that time the river was also called Pidhirtsi. Following the Polish-Ukrainian Alliance of 1920 it was intended as the border between Poland and Ukraine. After the Treaty of Riga the Polish-Soviet border was established in the area, running along the river (this situation lasted until 1939).

== Sites along the river ==
- Medobory Nature Reserve (near towns of Husiatyn and Hrymailiv)
- National Nature Park "Podilski Tovtry"
- Monochynsk Zakaznik
- Kudryntsi Castle
- Chornokozyntsi Castle
- crossing between the towns of Pidvolochysk and Volochysk, forming historically a major border checkpoint between the Austrian crown and the Russian Empire
- town of Husiatyn
- Skala-Podilska Castle and park (a state architectural monument)
