= Northern Podillia National Nature Park =

National park in Ukraine

- Ukrainian: Національний природний парк «Північне Поділля»
- IUCN category II (national park)
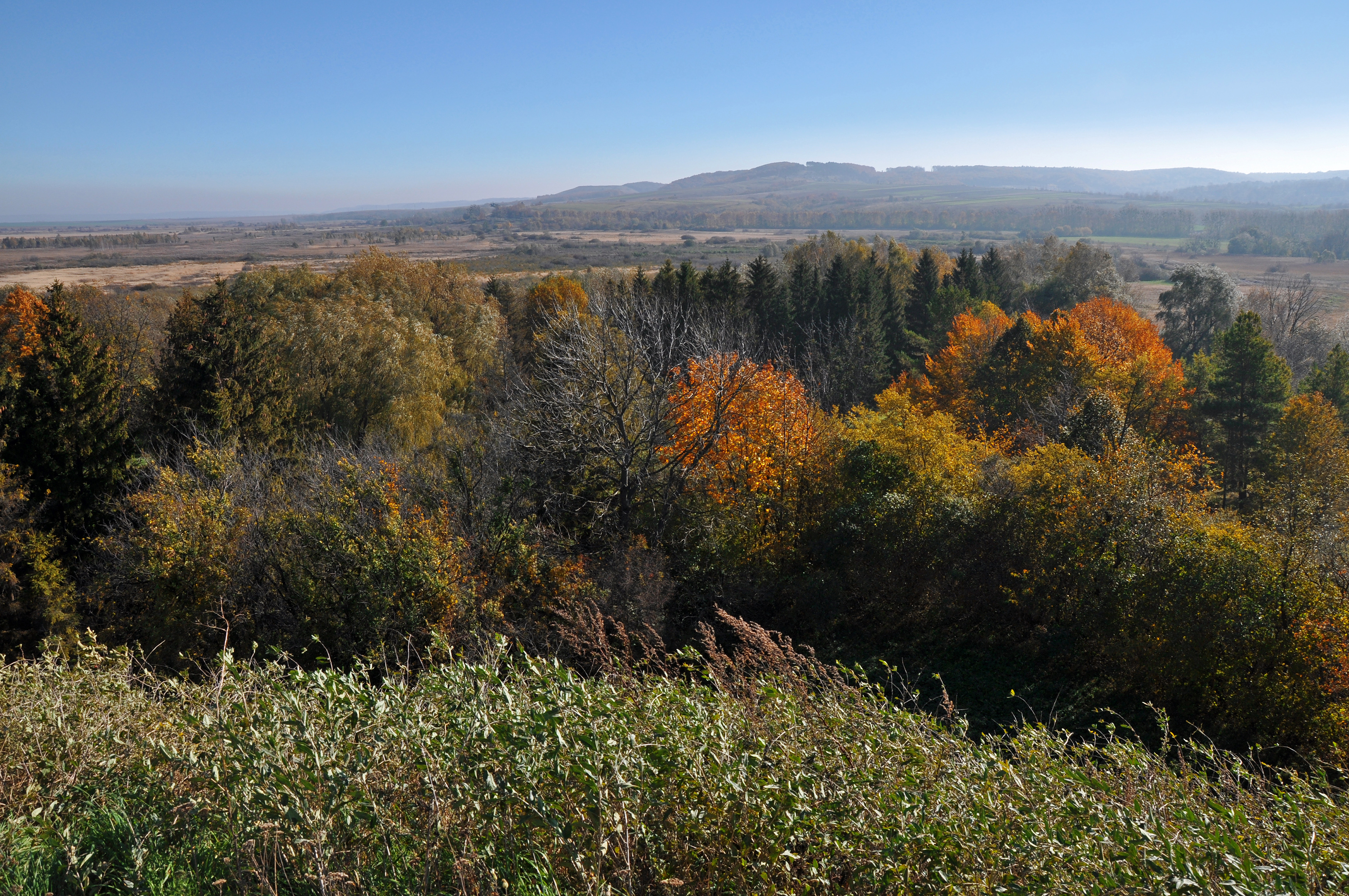
- National Nature Park Northern Podillia

- Location within Ukraine
- Location: Zolochiv Raion, Lviv Oblast
- Nearest city: Brody
- Coordinates: 49.917°N 25.1°E
- Area: 15,588 hectares (38,519 acres; 156 km^{2}; 60 sq mi)
- Established: 2009
- Governing body: Ministry of Ecology and Natural Resources (Ukraine)
- Website: http://park-podillya.com.ua/

The Northern Podillia National Nature Park (Ukrainian: Національний природний парк «Північне Поділля», romanized: Pivnične Podill'a) covers a variety of individual protected sites in the northwest Podolian Upland of Ukraine. The national park provides protection to, and recreation in, representative ecological and cultural sites of the area, including Hornbeam-Beech forested uplands, swamp-marsh floodplains, geologically significant karst features, and historical sites that include three castles and a number of WW1 and WW2 sites. The park is in Zolochiv Raion in Lviv Oblast

== Topography ==
The park is spread across 18 sites in two mountain ranges - the Holohory and Voronyaky - on the north slope of the Podilian Upland in northwest Ukraine. The mountains in this region are relatively low, up to 471 metres (1,545 ft), and drop steeply to the plains to the north.

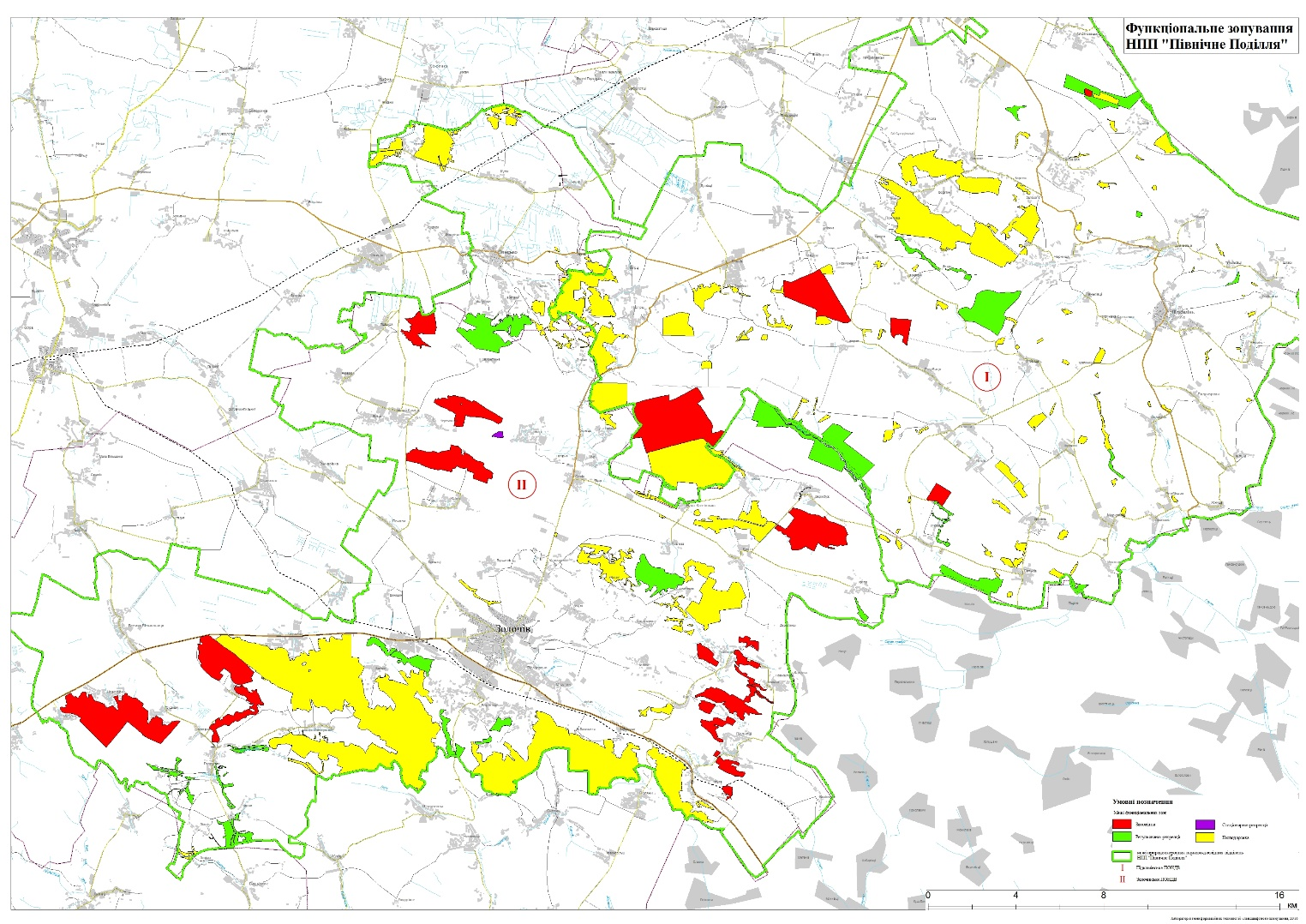
Map of separated sections of Northern Podolia National Nature Park

The park is an assemblage of different tracts, each selected for the protection of a particular habitat, geological feature, or cultural site. The core of the park was founded as a private nature reserve in 1886 by Count Volodymyr Dyuschitsky, an amateur ornithologist who desired protection of nesting habitat for the white-tailed eagle. The main sectors are:

Brody district:

- Makrite (Reserve). Covers the slopes of Mount Makitri, and originally created in 1931 to protect the Volynian steppe vegetation.
- Podkamen (reserve). A mountain forest reserve with a representative Beech tree forest.
- Ponkinsky hydrological reserve. Created for the conservation of complex floodplains of the Ikva and Styr Rivers.
- Sasovsky (natural monument). Preserves a mountainside Hornbeam-Beech forest.
- Torton sandstone outcrops. Covers the slopes of the Menich Mountains
- Erosive remains of sea reefs of the Tovtry or Medobory of the Sarmatian age in the vicinity of Pidkameni settlement.
- The Trinity (nature monument). Covers the slopes of the Zbarazh and Trinig mountains
- Monument Pienyatskaya. Original private nature reserve of Count Dyuschitsky.
- Oak witness. A 348-year-old oak tree, a local monument 25 meters high in the town of Brody.
- Pidhirtsky Park. Monumental garden of ornamental art in the Lviv National Art Gallery
- Blue windows. A series of small karst lakes (sunken limestone caves) of blue coloring.
- Horse. A memorial site dedicated to Ukrainians killed in World War II.

Zolochiv district:

- Zhulitskaya mountain. (the guardian's mountain). Cover three mountains (Zhulitskaya Gora, Storozhich Mountain, and Mount Vysoka), protecting vulnerable plants.
- Podnieka mountain or mountain, Markiyan Shashkevich. Protects a region of rare steppe vegetation.
- Holy Mountain. A forested mountain with rare plants.
- Fox mountain (tract). Botanical reserve with mixed forest and rare shrub brush.
- Mount Limestone. A mountain composed of limestone and carbonate sandstone.
- Forest under the Labor. Low mountain range with beech forests.
- Forest in the vicinity of Verkhobuzh. Low mountain range with beech forests.
- Verkhobuzsky Reserve. Unique fragment of the Western Bug River valley, with over 20 species of rare plants.
- Lipa Bogdan Khmelnitsky. Oldest Linden tree in Ukraine (600 years).
- Great Stone. Large picturesque rock of glacial origin.

== Climate and ecoregion ==
The climate of Northern Podillia is Humid continental climate, warm summer (Köppen climate classification (Dfb)). This climate is characterized by large seasonal temperature differentials and a warm summer (at least four months averaging over 10 °C (50 °F), but no month averaging over 22 °C (72 °F). The highest average temperature is in June (20.1 °C (68.2 °F)), and the average precipitation is 700–800 mm/year.

Northern Podillia NP is located in the Central European mixed forests ecoregion, a temperate hardwood forest covering much of northeastern Europe, from Germany to Russia.

== Flora and fauna ==
Over 200 species of plants of varying conservation status are found on the territory of the park. 127 birds have been recorded, and 41 mammals.

== Public use ==
There are six significant tourist trails in the park, developed for ecological education.

== See also ==
- National Parks of Ukraine
