= Holohory =

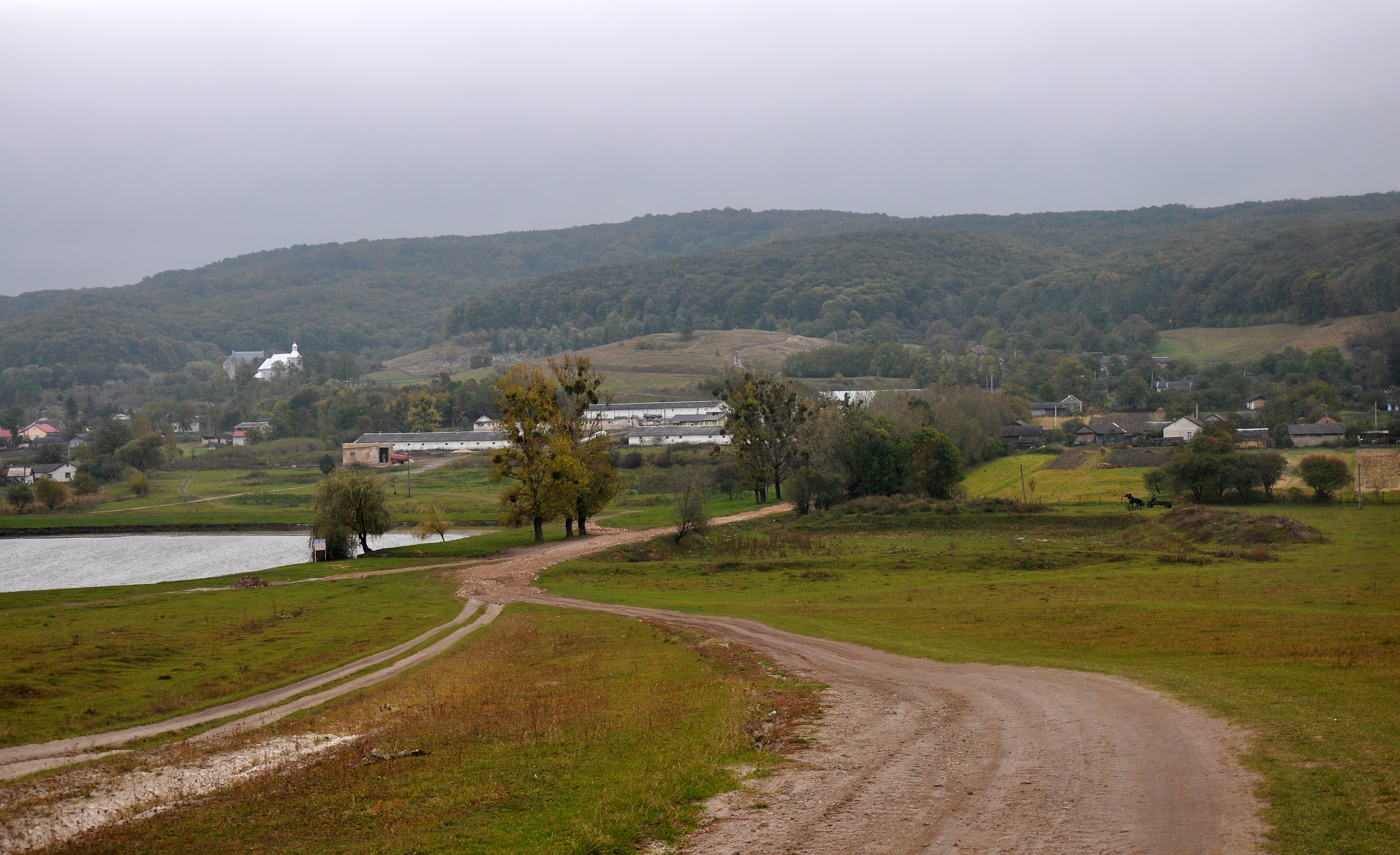
Vapnyarka Mountain of Holohory, a natural monument

Holohory (Ukrainian: Гологори; Russian: Гологоры, romanized: Gologory; Polish: Gołogóry) is a hill range in the northwestern part of Podolian Upland, Ukraine, stretching from Lviv to Zolochiv, constituting part of the European watershed. The name literally means "bare mountains".

== Geographic features ==
Holohory ridge has a length of 45 kilometers, reaching from Bibrka to the village of Pluhiv in Zolochiv Raion. It width reaches 10 kilometers. The northern edge of Holohory forms a steep incline with relative heights of up to 100 meters above the adjoining Little Polesia plain. The southern slopes, meanwhile, are more gentle and gradually transit into the hills of Peremyshliany plateau (Horbohirya).

The range is dissected by tributaries of the Buh river. Its highest point is Kamula (mountain) with the height of 471 meters above sea level. A characteristic feature of Holohory is the presence of numerous "bays", where lowland areas of Little Polesia bulge into the ridge.

== Historical role ==
Starting from the 9th century, the Holohory ridge played an important strategic role, serving as the dividing line between the tribes of Buzhans and White Croats. During the latter period it formed the common border of Volhynian and Galician lands.
