= Stilske Horbohirya Regional Landscape Park =

Protected area in Lviv Oblast, Ukraine

- Ukrainian: Регіональний ландшафтний парк «Стільське Горбогір'я»
- IUCN category V (protected landscape/seascape)
- Location within Lviv Oblast Location within Ukraine
- Location: Lviv region, Lviv district, Stryi district
- Nearest city: Mykolaiv
- Coordinates: 49°37′45″N 23°59′56″E
- Area: 9,161.68 ha (22,639.0 acres)
- Established: 2014 │2020
- Governing body: Special Administration (public institution of Lviv regional council)
- Website: www.facebook.com/stilskehorb/

The Stilske Horbohirya Regional Landscape Park (Ukrainian: Регіональний Ландшафтний Парк «Стільське Горбогір'я») - is an object of the Nature Reserve Fund of Ukraine in the Lviv region, Ukraine. Covering part of territory of Lviv and Mykolaiv districts of Lviv region, total area of Regional landscape Park equals 9,162 hectares. Stilske Horbohirya Regional Landscape Park located on lands of "Lviv forestry business enterprise", "Stryi forestry business enterprise" and "Mykolaiv Halsillis" national forestry enterprises, as well as Stilsko, Brodky and Drohovyzh village councils.

== History ==
The municipal institution of the Lviv Regional Council "Special Administration of the 'Stilske Horbohirya' Regional Landscape Park" was established in August 2020. Regional Landscape Park itself was created on 1 April 2014, but based on article 12 of Ukrainian law "On Nature Reserve Fund of Ukraine", the park was rendered non-functional until establishment of Special Administration.

== Geographical characteristics ==
Stilske Horbohirya, located in the central part of the Lviv region, stretching from the outskirts of Lviv to the Dniester River. It belongs to the area of Bibrsko - Peremyshlyanske Opillya. The regional landscape park is characterized by hilly terrain with absolute heights of 300-400 m, densely divided by small rivers, gullies and ravines. The dominant areas are ridges of different heights, they are almost completely covered with hornbeam, oak-hornbeam and beech forests. Within the Stilske Horbohirya and adjacent areas located a number of nature reserves of local and national importance, including a complex natural monument "Stilske", protected tract "Rozdilske", landscape reserves "Lypnykivskyi", "Staritsy Dnistra" and others. Rich historical and cultural heritage is located within the region. Stilsko settlement of 8–11 centuries is a unique monument of ancient Ukrainian history and culture. More than three dozen settlements, mounds, pagan sanctuaries, and cave temples have been recorded near the vicinity of the settlement. Numerous architectural monuments (churches, cathedrals, castle ruins) have also been preserved in Rakivets, Pidtemne, Kuhaiv, Mykolayiv, Rozdil, Berezdivtsi. In 2020, representatives of the Stilske Gorbohirya Regional Landscape Park and NGO the Danube-Carpathian Program conducted observations and identified valuable areas of ancient beech forests that will be included to the protected area in the future. The natural vegetation of the Stilske Gorbohirya Regional Landscape Park is represented mainly by deciduous, less often mixed forests with beech, hornbeam-beech, pine-beech, oak trees, etc. Hayfields are much smaller areas compared to forest vegetation. According to the results of preliminary field observation on the territory of RLP "Stilske Gorbohirya" 44 species of vascular plants which are included in the third edition of the Red Book of Ukraine in 2009 are timed to the region. Among them are allium ursinum, botrychium virginianum, dactylorhiza majalis, iris sibirica, platanthera chlorantha and others. Also, 15 regionally rare taxon are subjected to protection in Lviv region. The fauna of the park is represented by various species. Among mammals, in particular, marten stone, weasel, ermine, badger, river otter, wild boar, red deer, European marten, fox, European beaver, gray hare can be distinguished. In general, representatives of all classes of vertebrates, among which are 117 species of birds (black millstone, western nightingale, gray crane, black stork, white stork) can be seen. The significant dominance of nesting birds is present.

== Main objectives ==
- to preserve precious natural complexes and objects;
- to create conditions for effective tourism, recreation and other kinds of recreational activities in natural environment while remaining protective over natural reservation complexes and objects;
- to promote ecological education;
- to conduct scientific researches;
- to sustain general ecological balance over the region.
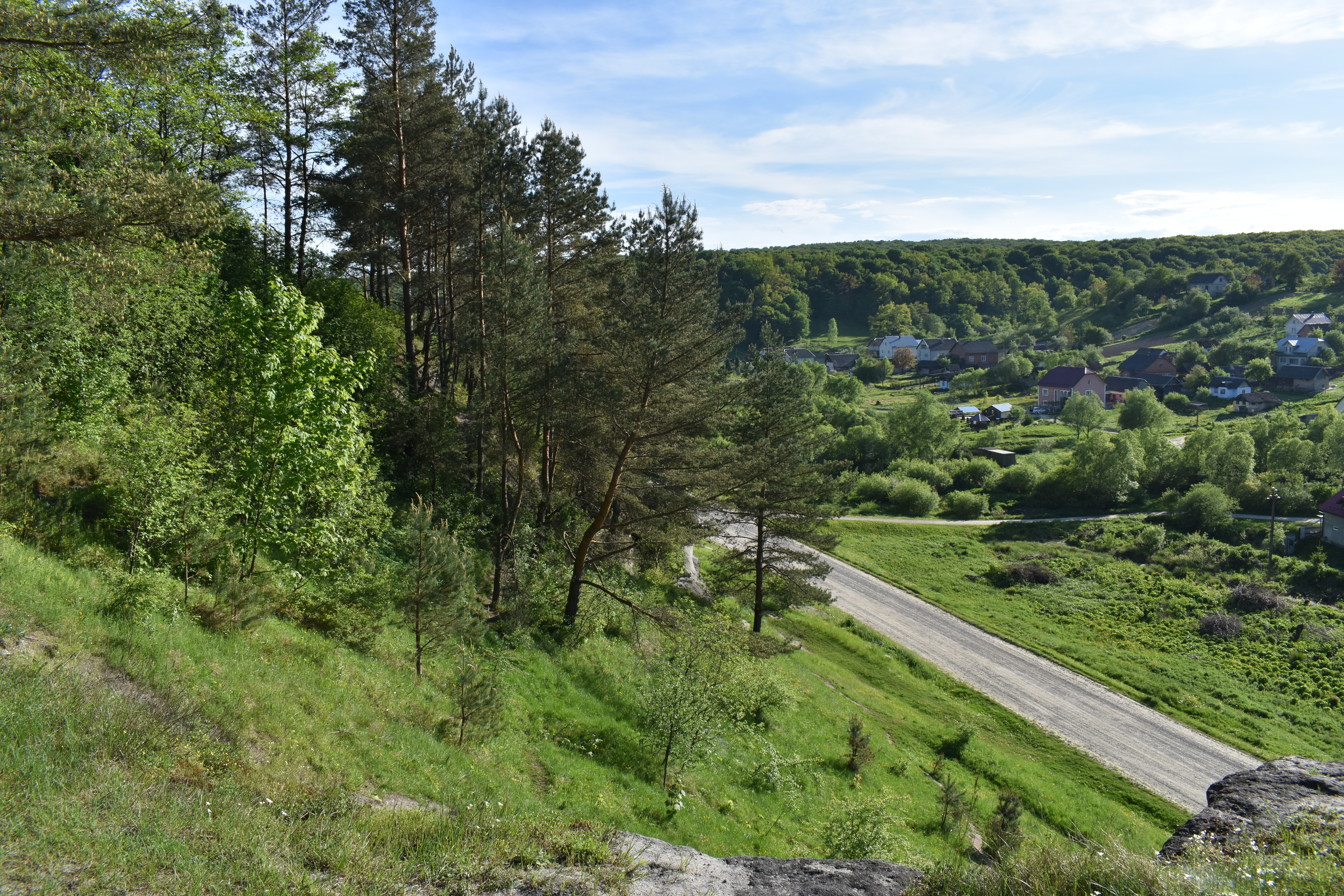
  View from platform of "Diravets Stone" natural heritage site
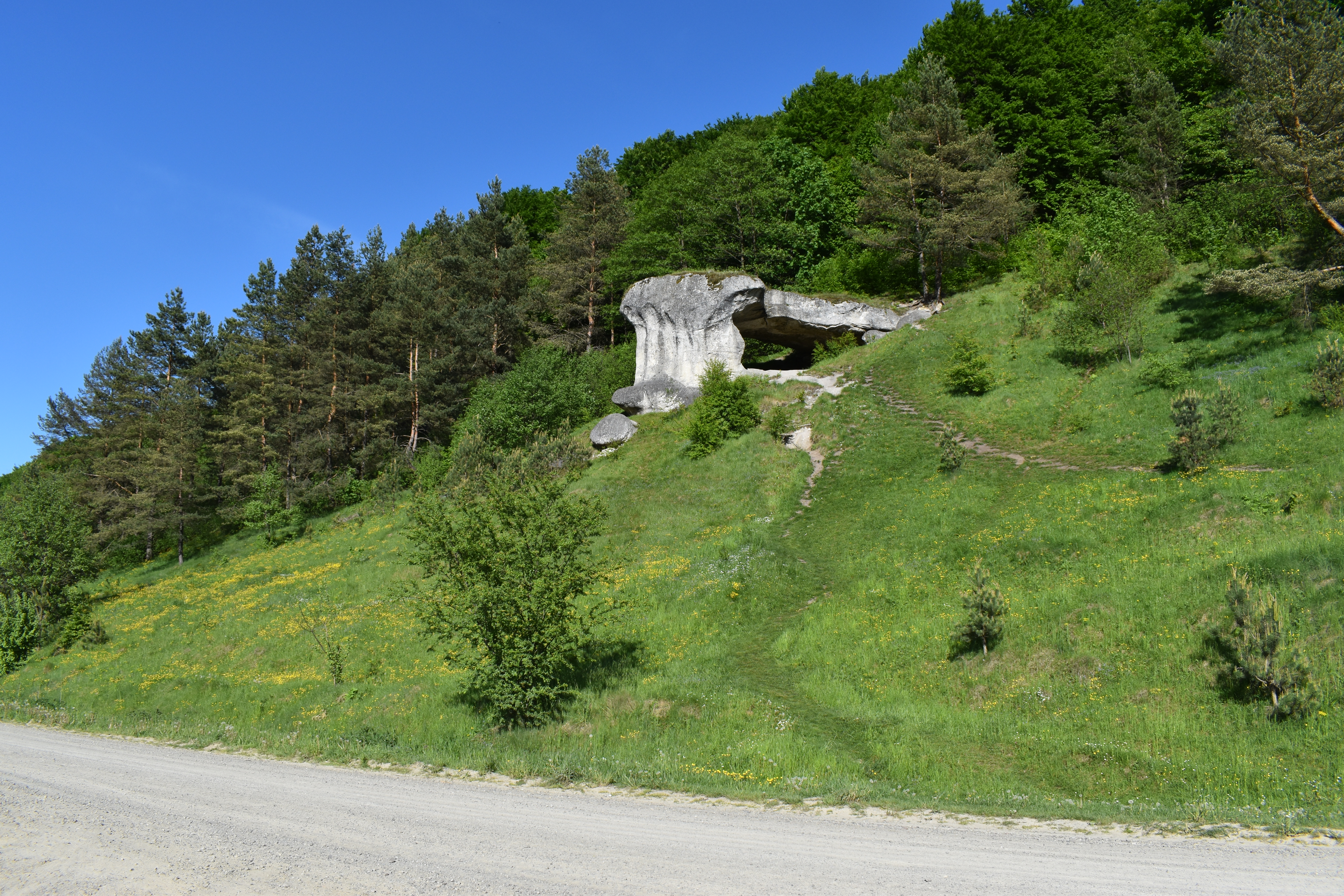
  Diravets Stone
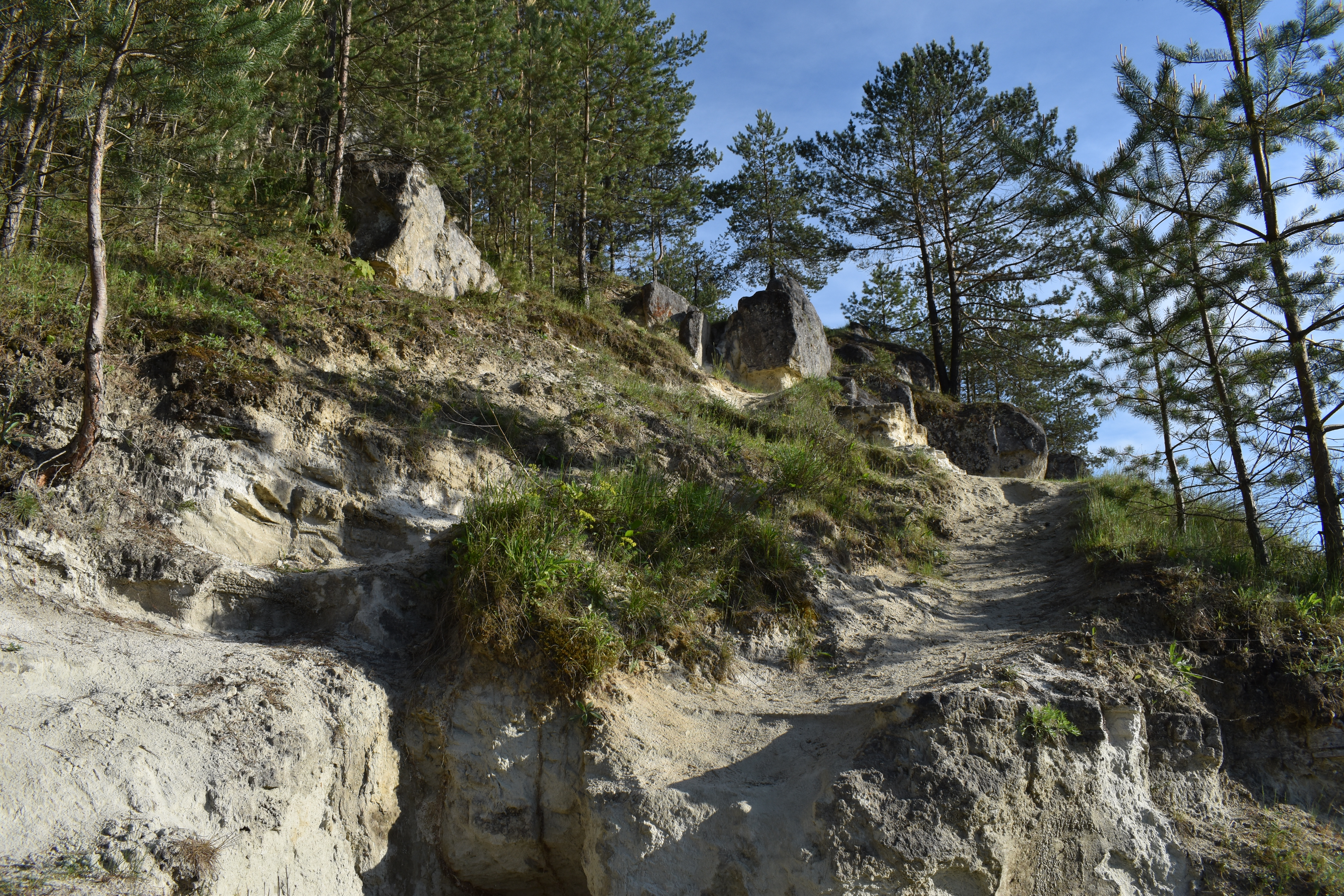
  Rock formation near Dubrova village
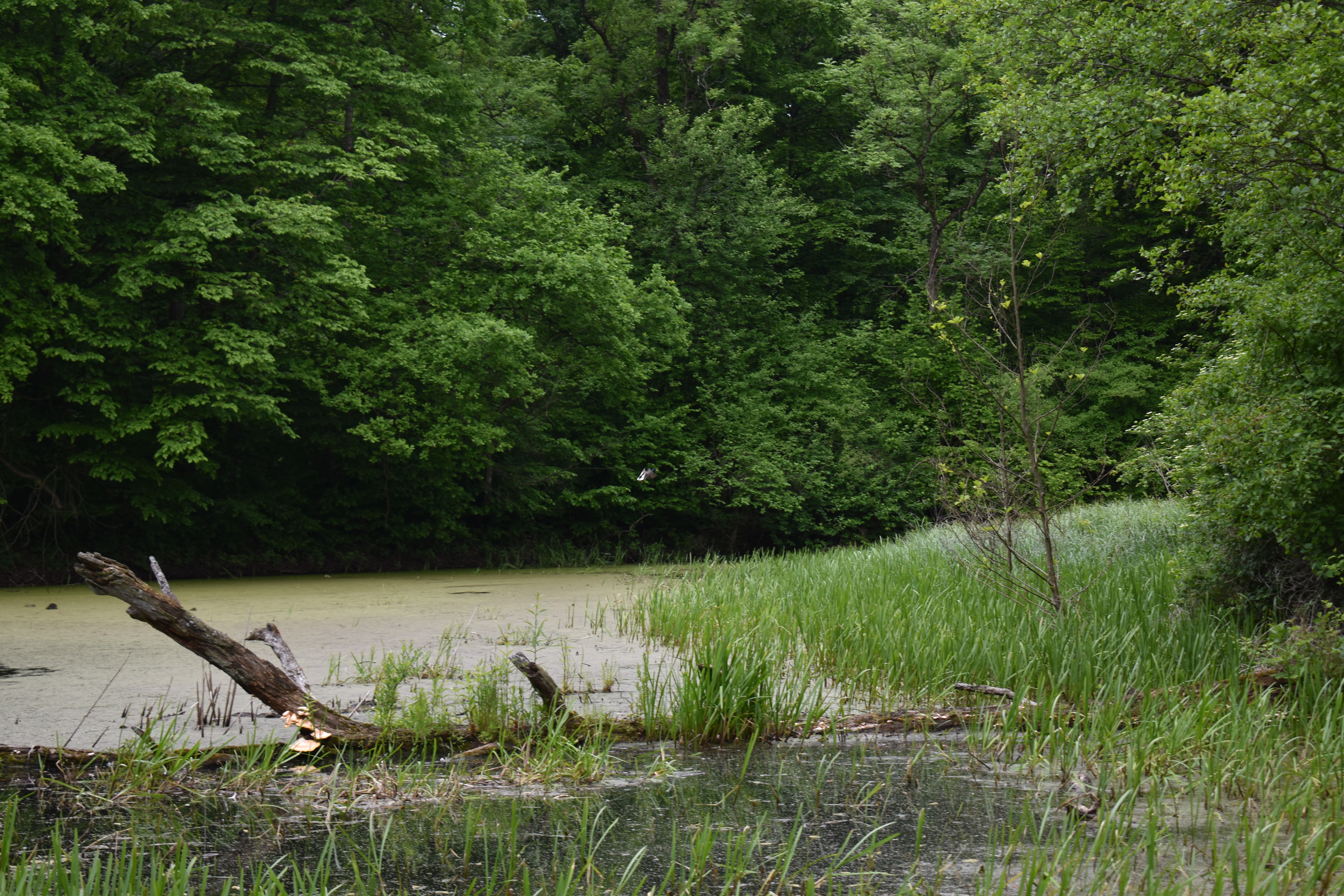
  Tract "Turkiv Kut"
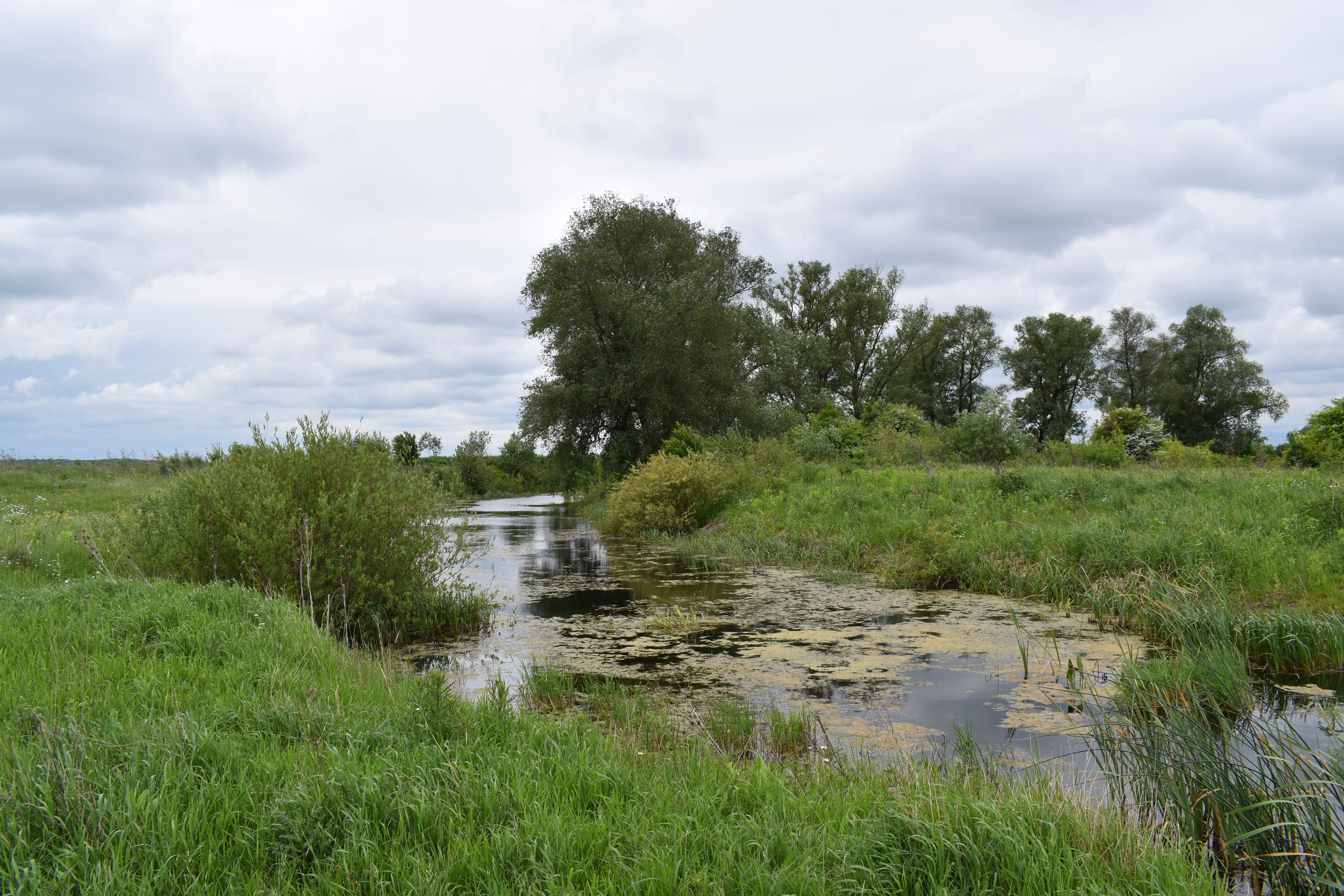
  Tract "Vydnyi Bereg"
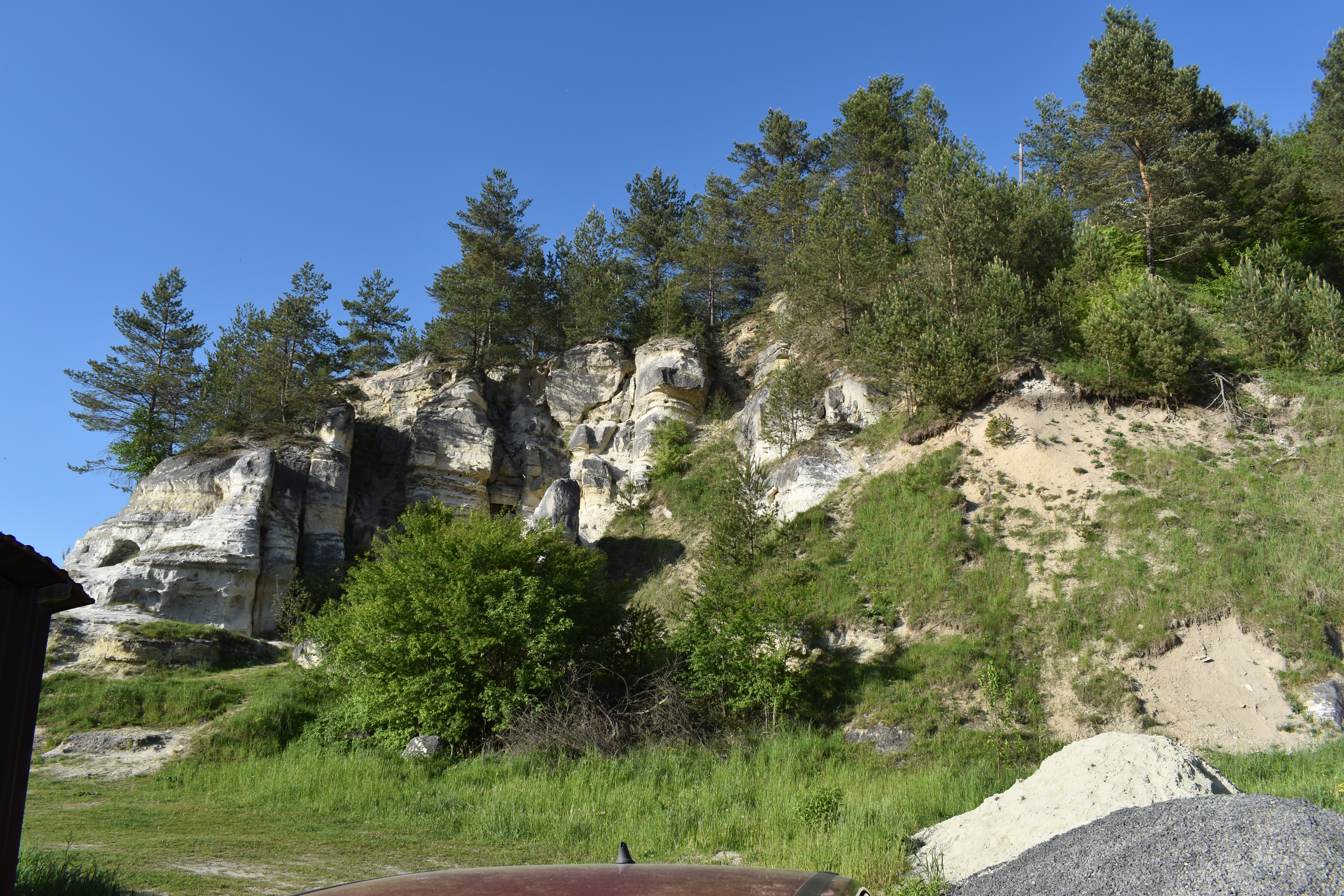
  General view of rock formation near Dubrova village
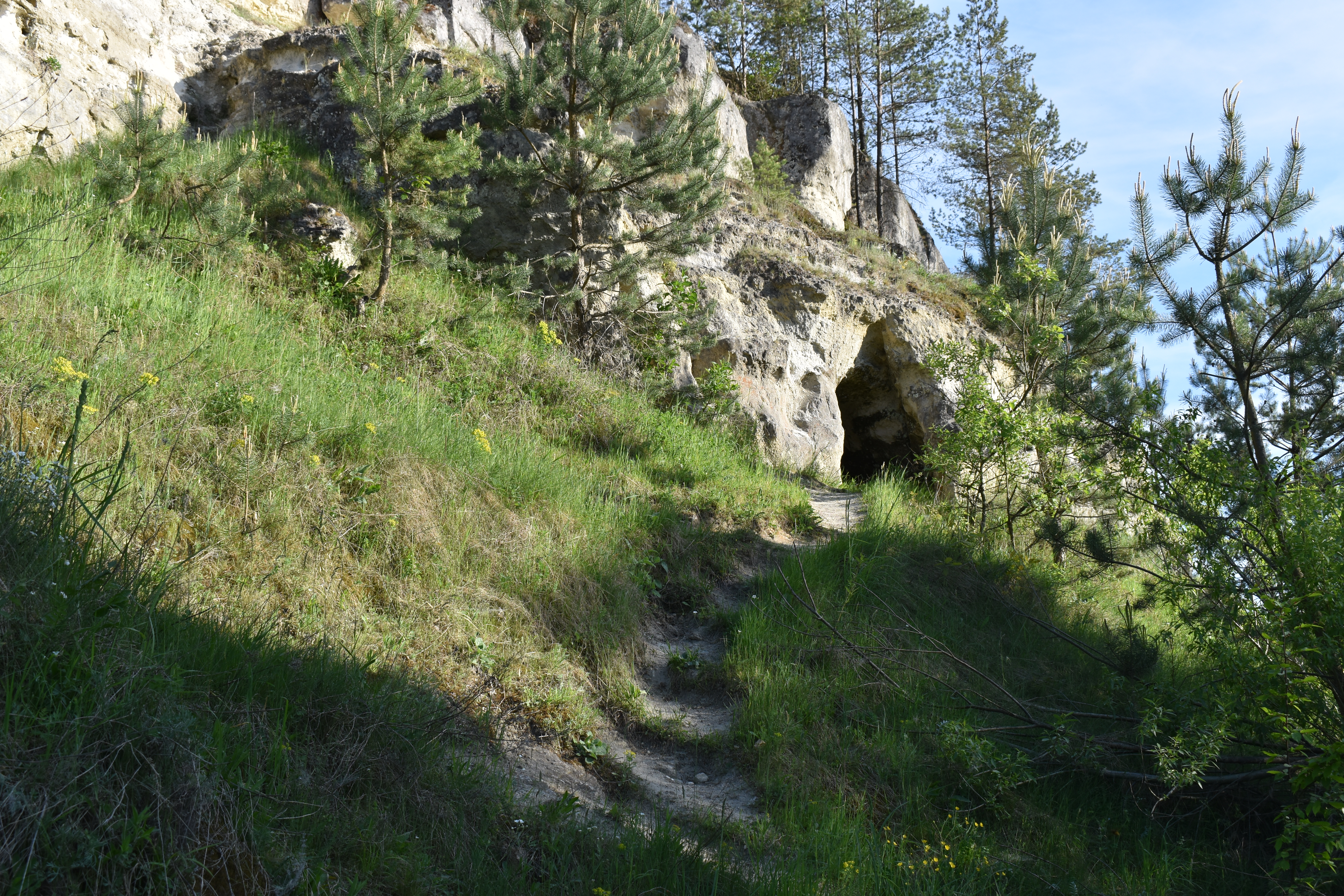
  Caves near Dubrova village
