= Zolochiv =

Zolochiv (Ukrainian: Золочів) may refer to the following places in Ukraine:

- Zolochiv, Lviv Oblast, city in Lviv Oblast
  - Zolochiv Raion, Lviv Oblast, a subdivision named for the city
  - Zolochiv urban hromada, in the raion
- Zolochiv, Kharkiv Oblast, urban-type settlement in Ukraine
  - Zolochiv Raion, Kharkiv Oblast, a former subdivision
- Zolochivska rural hromada, southeast of Kyiv
