= Ikva =

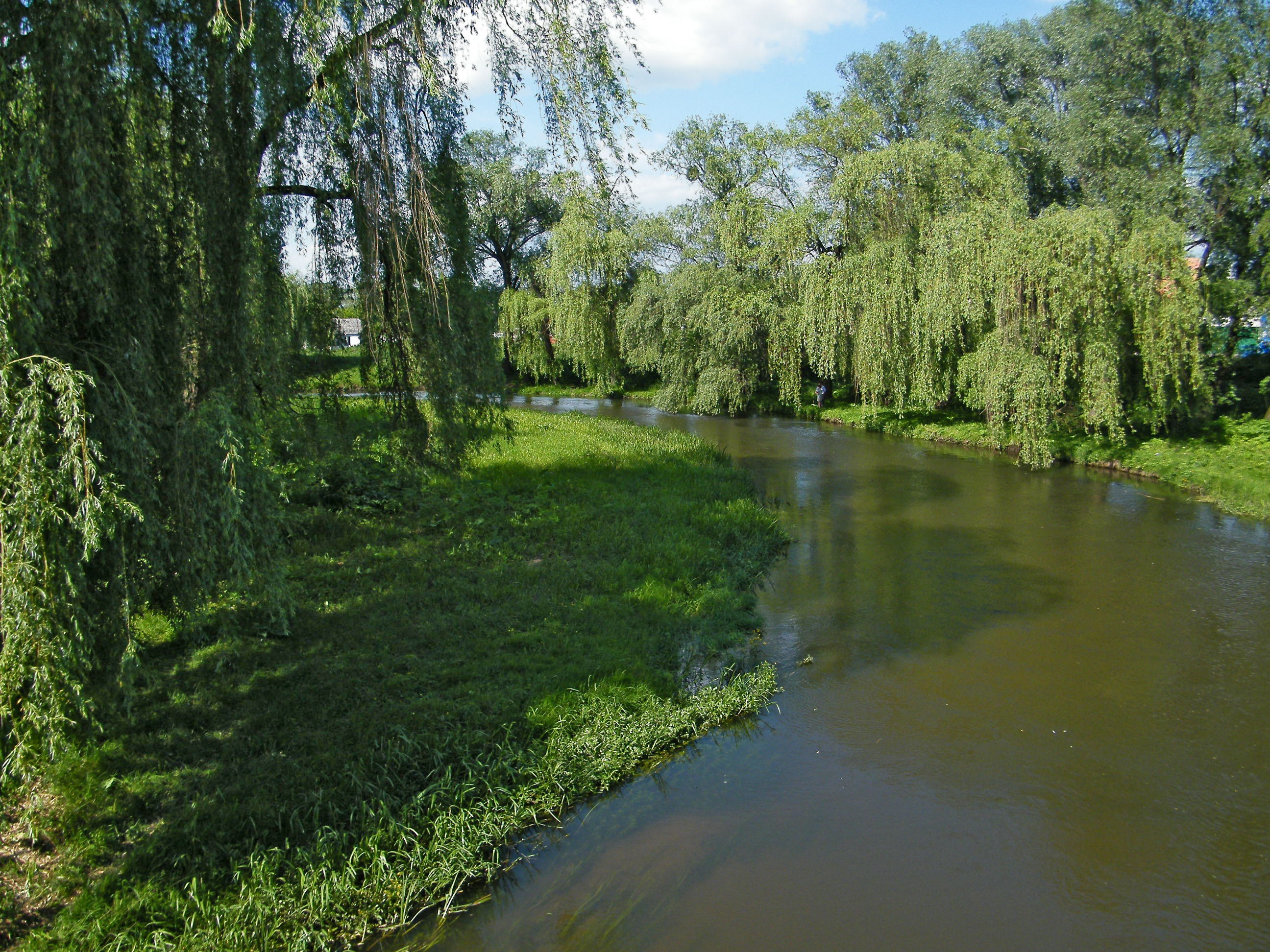
- Ikva near Dubno
- Native name: Іква (Ukrainian)

Location
- Country: Ukraine

Physical characteristics
- Source
  - location: Chernytsia, Zolochiv Raion, Ukraine
  - coordinates: 49°57′56″N 25°13′45″E
- Mouth: Styr River
  - coordinates: 50.5641°N 25.3950°E
- Length: 155 km (96 mi)
- Basin size: 2,250 km^{2} (870 sq mi)

Basin features
- Progression: Styr→ Pripyat→ Dnieper→ Dnieper–Bug estuary→ Black Sea

The Ikva (Ukrainian: Іква) is a river in Ukraine and a right tributary of the Styr River that flows through Lviv Oblast, Ternopil Oblast and Rivne Oblast in the Volhynian Upland.

It is 155 kilometres (96 mi) long and its basin area is 2,250 square kilometres (869 sq mi). The river has at least one water reservoir near Mlyniv. Among its main tributaries is the Tartatska (right). The city of Dubno is located on the Ikva.
