= Styr =

River in Eastern Europe; tributary of the Pripyat

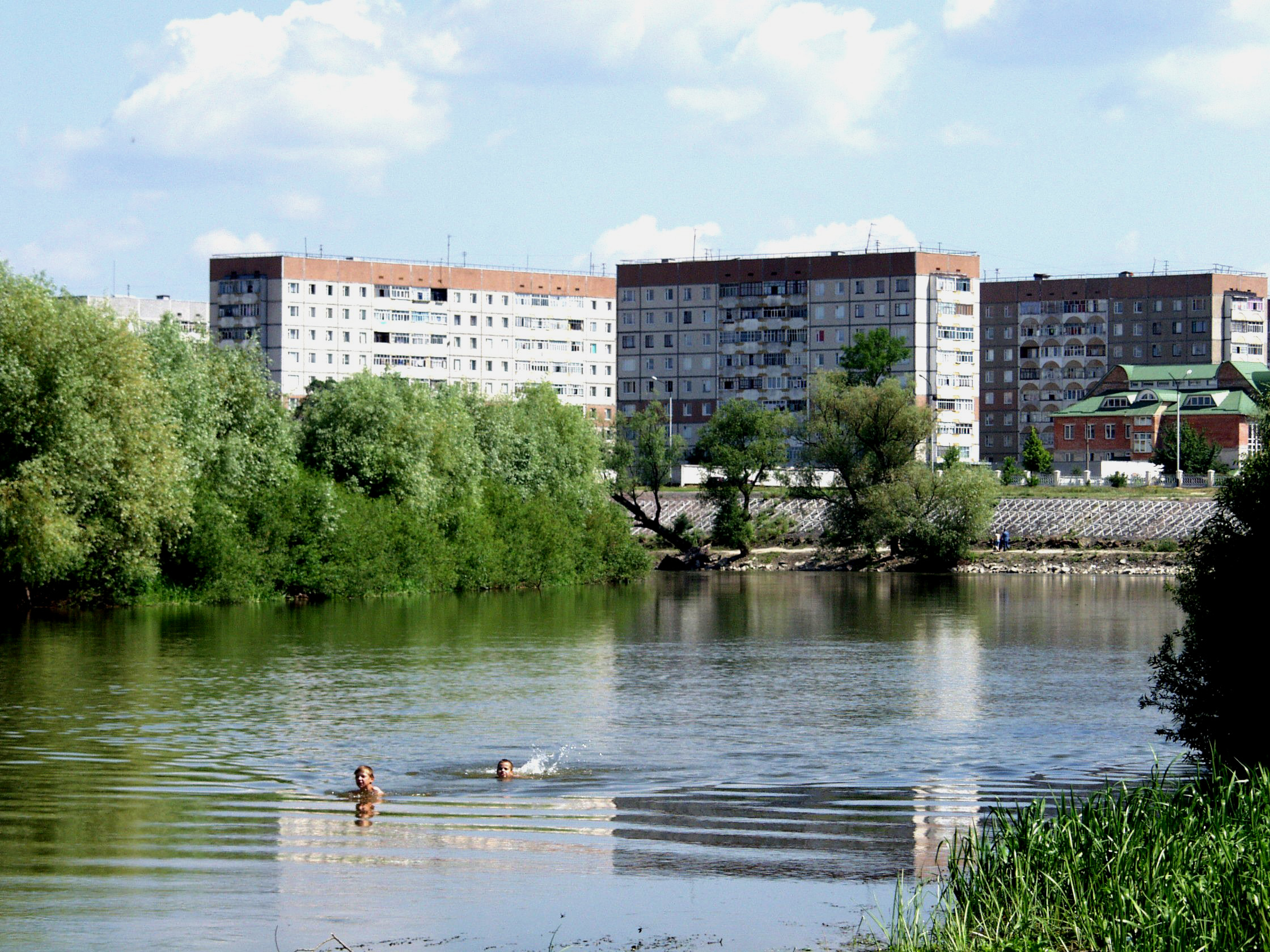
- Styr near Varash

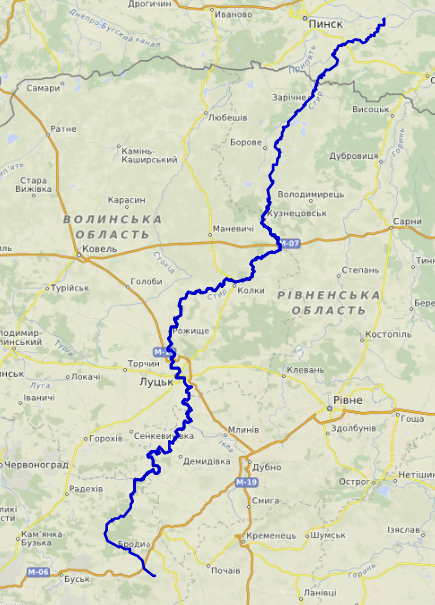
- Native name: Стир (Ukrainian); Стыр (Belarusian)

Location
- Country: Ukraine, Belarus

Physical characteristics
- Source
  - location: Lviv Oblast, Ukraine
- Mouth: Pripyat
  - coordinates: 52.1076°N 26.5829°E
- Length: 494 km (307 mi)
- Basin size: 13,100 km^{2} (5,100 sq mi)

Basin features
- Progression: Pripyat→ Dnieper→ Dnieper–Bug estuary→ Black Sea

The Styr (Ukrainian: Стир; Belarusian: Стыр; Russian: Стырь) is a right tributary of the Pripyat, with a length of 494 kilometres (307 mi). Its basin area is 13,100 square kilometres (5,100 sq mi) and located in the historical region of Volhynia.

The Styr begins near Brody, Lviv Oblast, then flows into Rivne Oblast, Volyn Oblast, then into Brest Region of Belarus where it finally flows into the Pripyat.

Notable settlements located on the river are Lutsk, Staryi Chortoryisk and Varash.

== History ==
During the Khmelnytskyi Uprising, the Battle of Berestechko took place in 1651 on the river between armies of the Polish-Lithuanian Commonwealth and the Cossacks of Bohdan Khmelnytsky.

During 1915–1916, the Styr river was the front line between the Austro-Hungarian and Imperial Russian armies.

The river was also a barrier to the German invasion on June 22, 1941, during Operation Barbarossa on the South-Western Front.

== Tributaries ==
- Left: Radostavka, Sudylivka, Chornohuzka, Lypa, Serna, Liutytsia, Okinka, Richytsia, Zhyduvka, Omelianyk
- Right: Ikva, Slonivka, Pliashivka, Boldurka, Liubka, Rudka, Kormyn, Riv, Konopelka, Sapalayivka

== Images ==
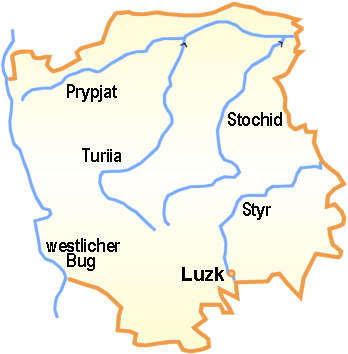
The Styr River on the map of Volyn Oblast

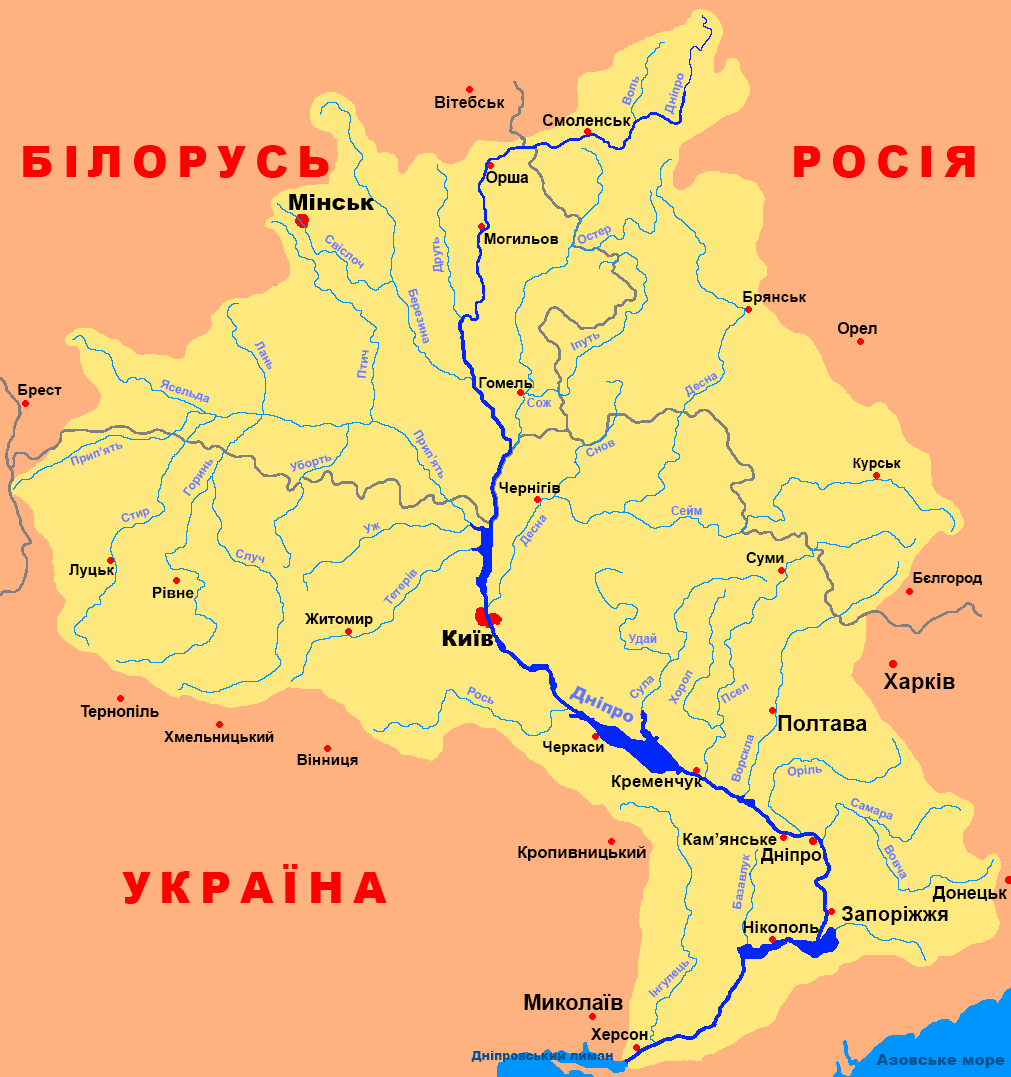
Dnieper basin

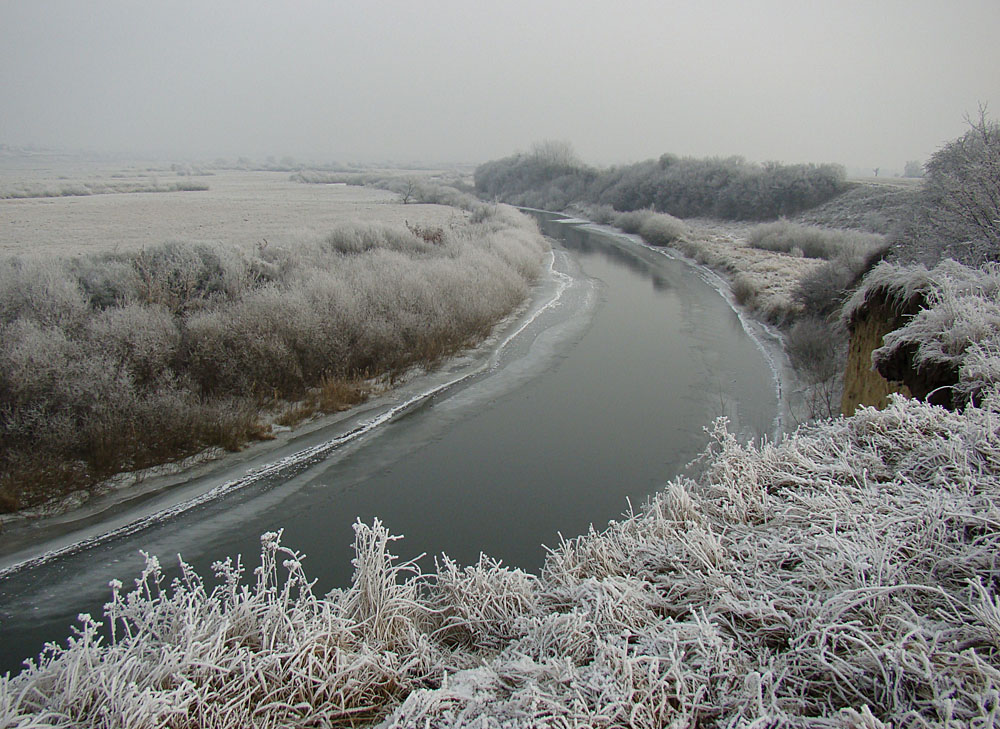
In frost near Boratyn
