= Podolian Upland =

Highland area in Ukraine, part of the East European Plain

Coordinates: 49.0275°N 27.8562°E

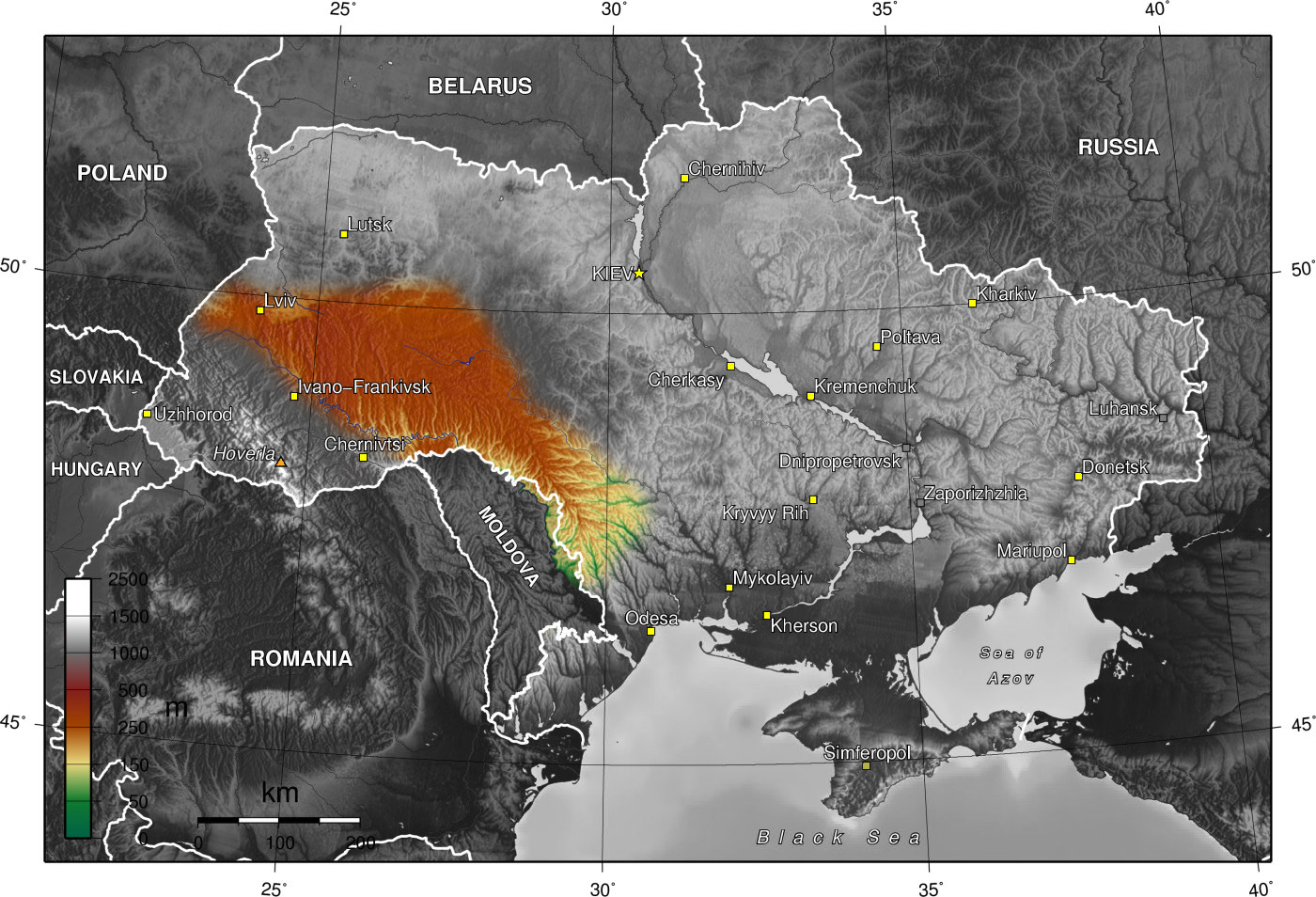
Podolian Upland

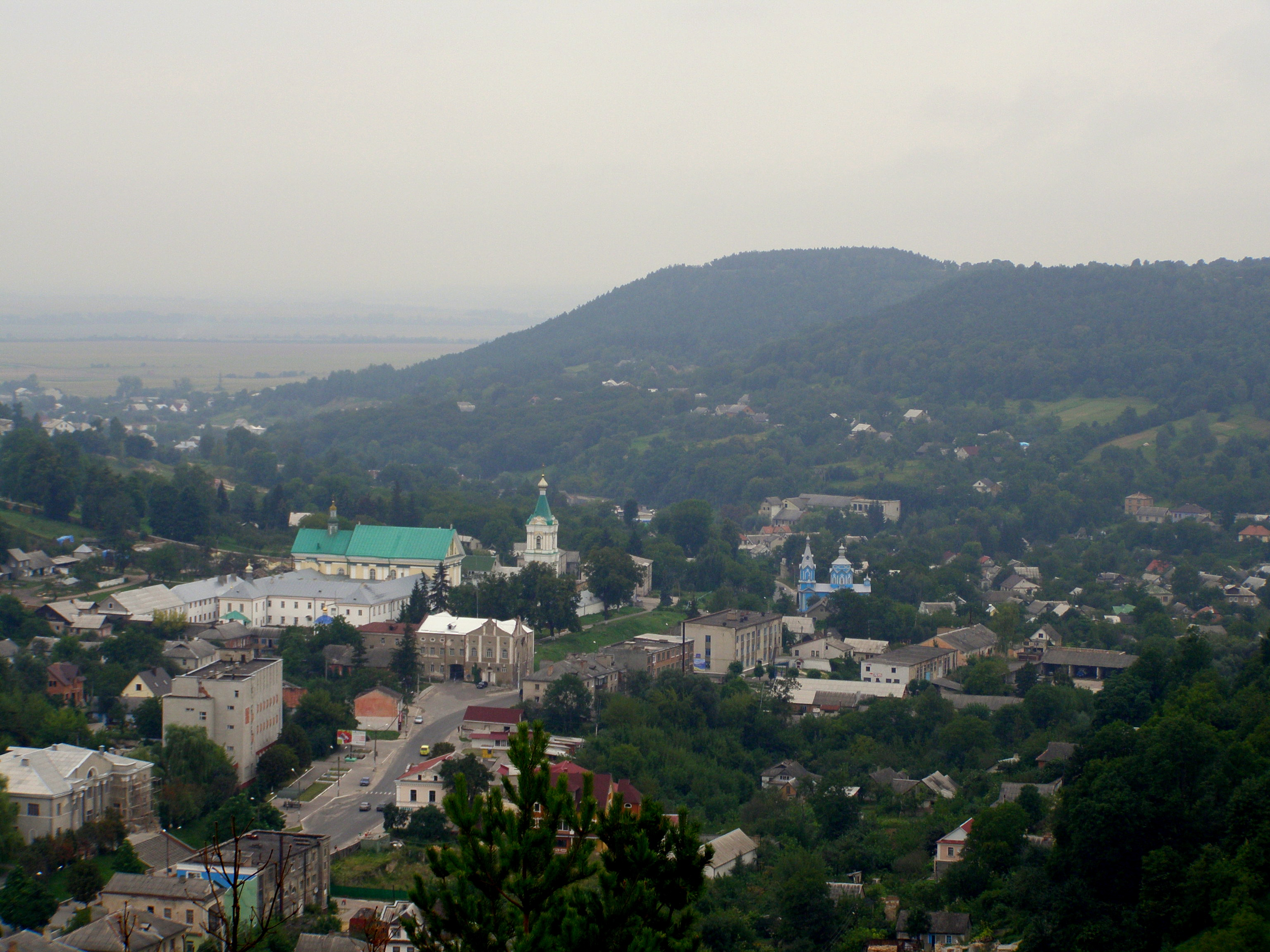
Kremenets Hills around the city of Kremenets

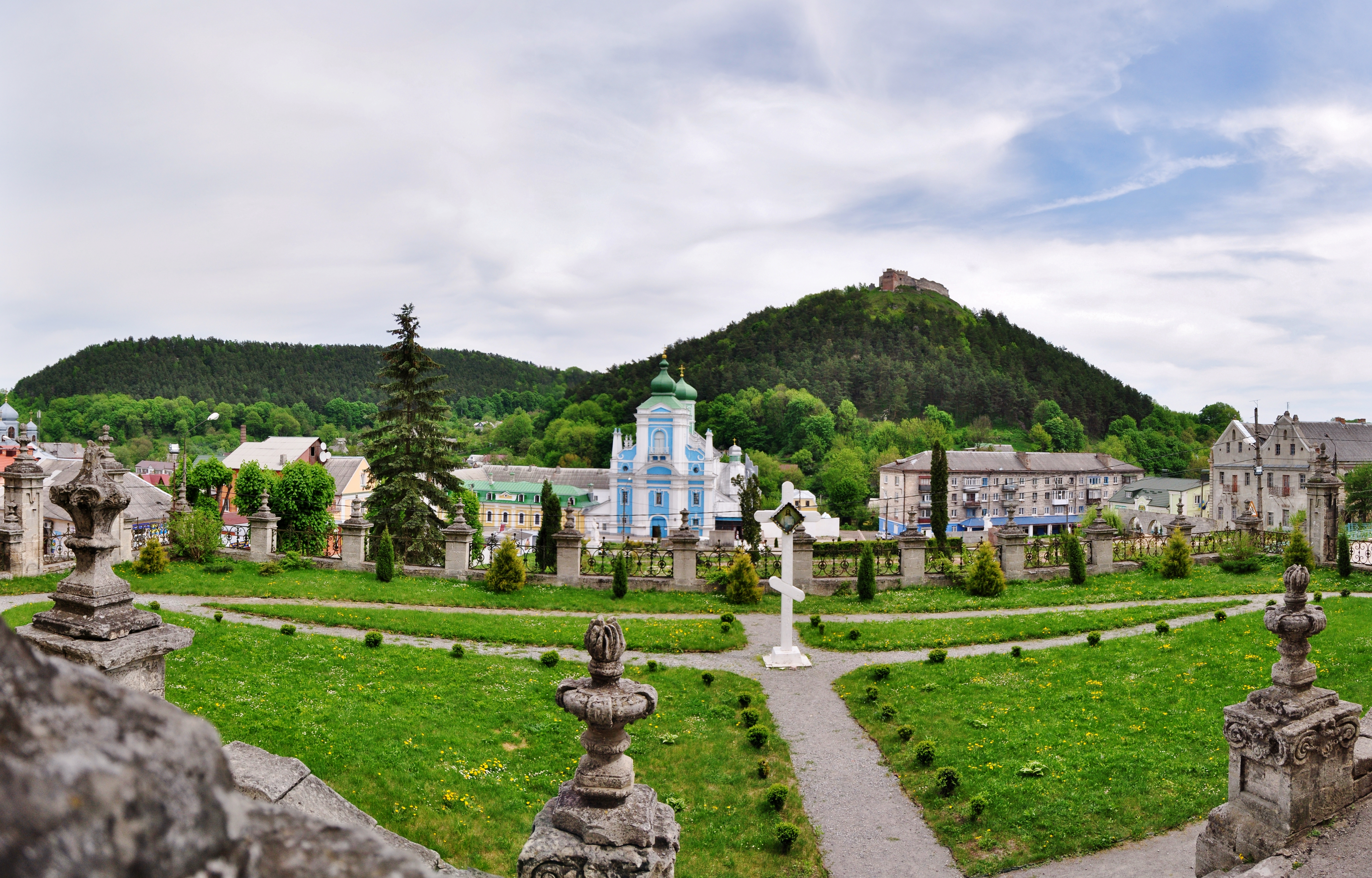
Bona Hill (Mountain) with ruins at its top

The Podolian Upland (Podolian Plateau) or Podillia Upland (Ukrainian: Подільська височина, Podilska vysochyna) is an upland area in southwestern Ukraine, on the left (northeast) bank of the Dniester River, with small portions in its western extent stretching into eastern Poland.

The region lies roughly between the Southern Bug and Dniester Rivers, with the Western Bug also originating in the northwest of the highlands. The average altitude of the Podolian Upland is over 300 m (980 ft) with the maximum being a hill known as Kamula Mountain, at 471 m (1,545 ft).

The surface is characterized by a combination of wide flat interfluves and deep canyon-like valleys (so called dales) dissected into separate natural sub-regions:

- Wooded elevated hills
  - Roztochia
  - Opillia
  - Holohory
  - Voroniaky
  - Kremenets Hills (Mountains)
  - Tovtry
- Flat treeless plateaus
  - Ternopil Plateau
  - Upper Buh Plateau
  - North-Podolian Plateau

It also includes the Avratyn Upland The Podolian Upland and the Volhynian Upland are sometimes grouped together as the Volhynian-Podolian Upland.

== Gallery ==
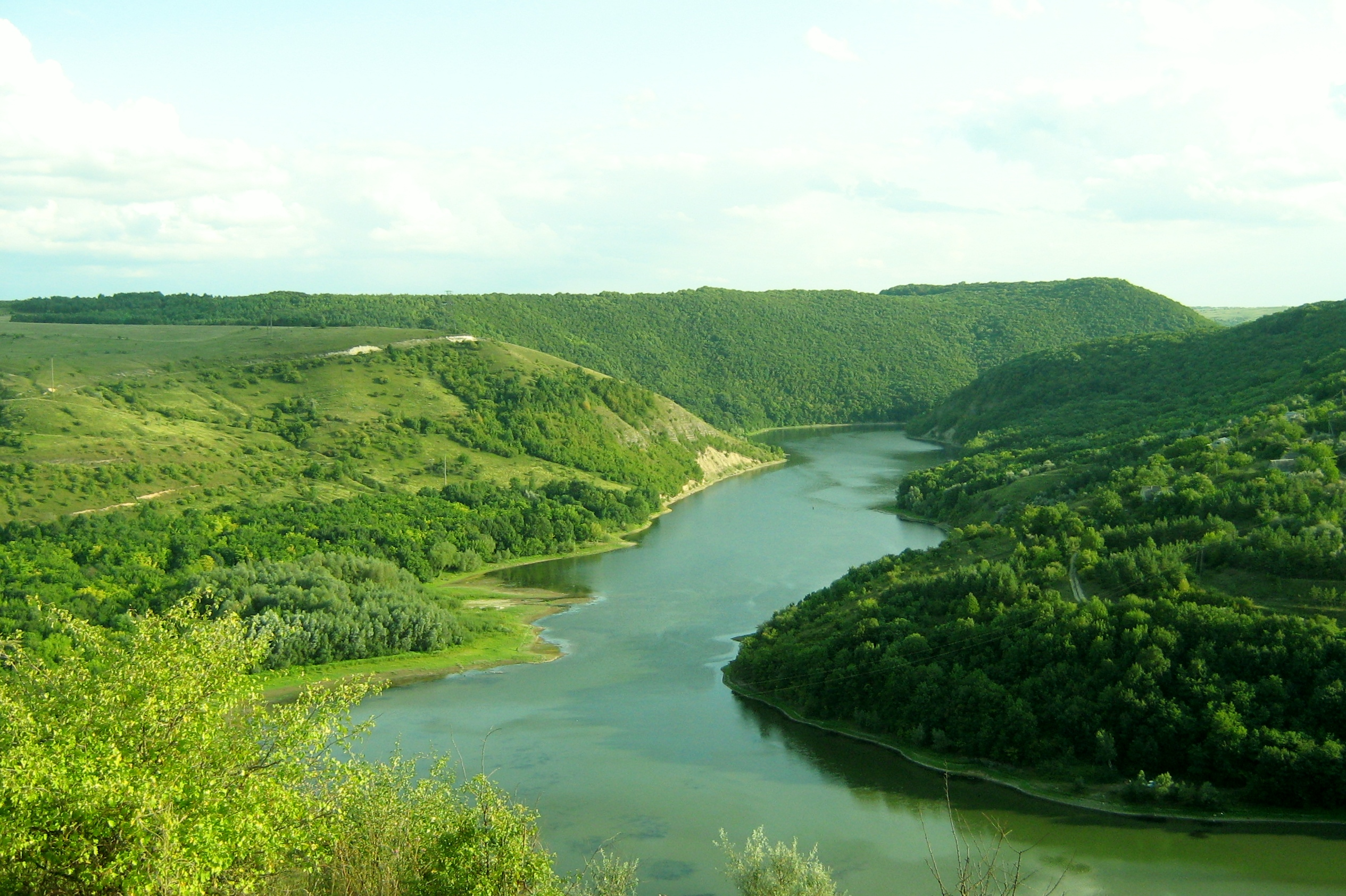
Podolian Tovtry

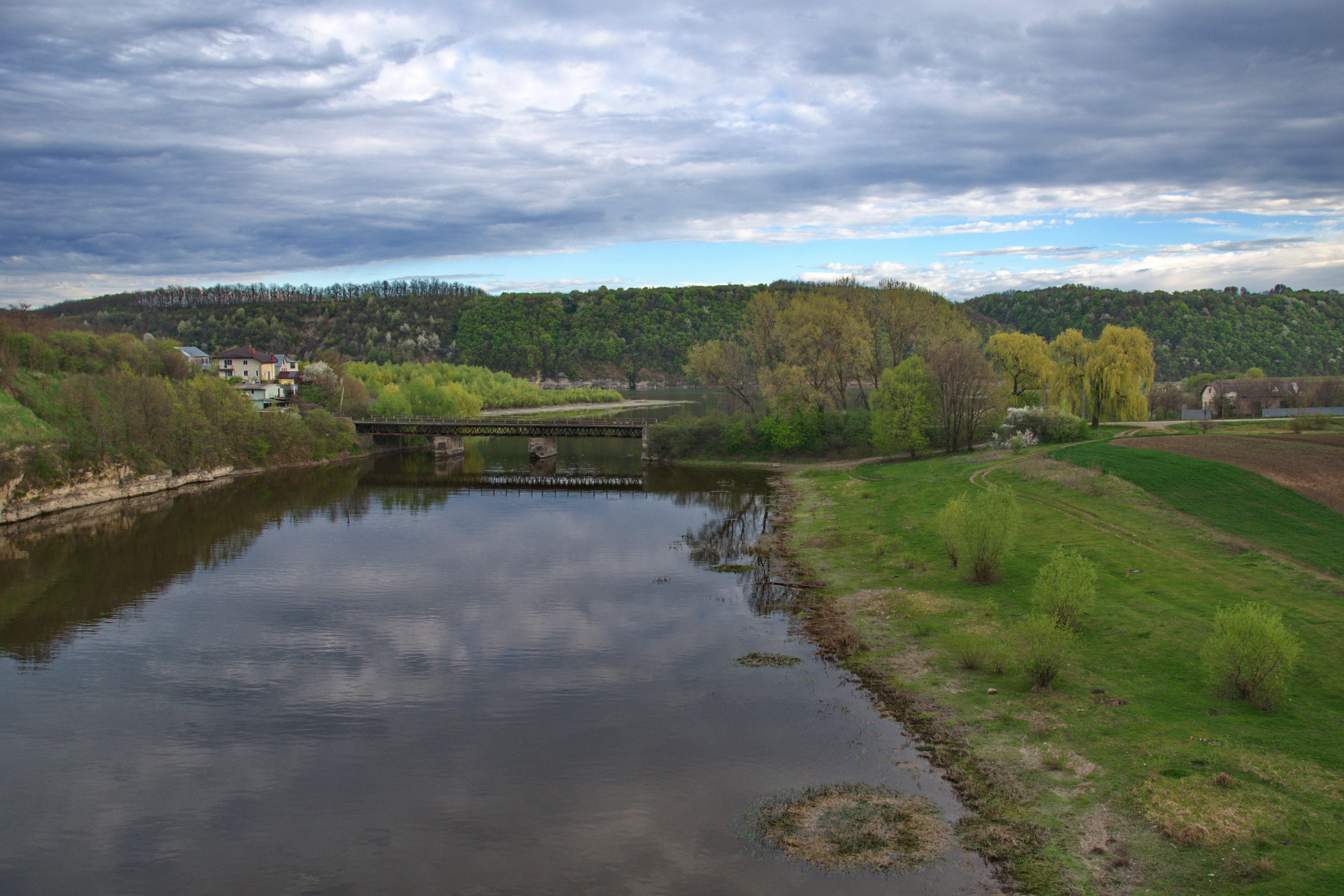
Tovtry at confluence of Zbruch and Dniester

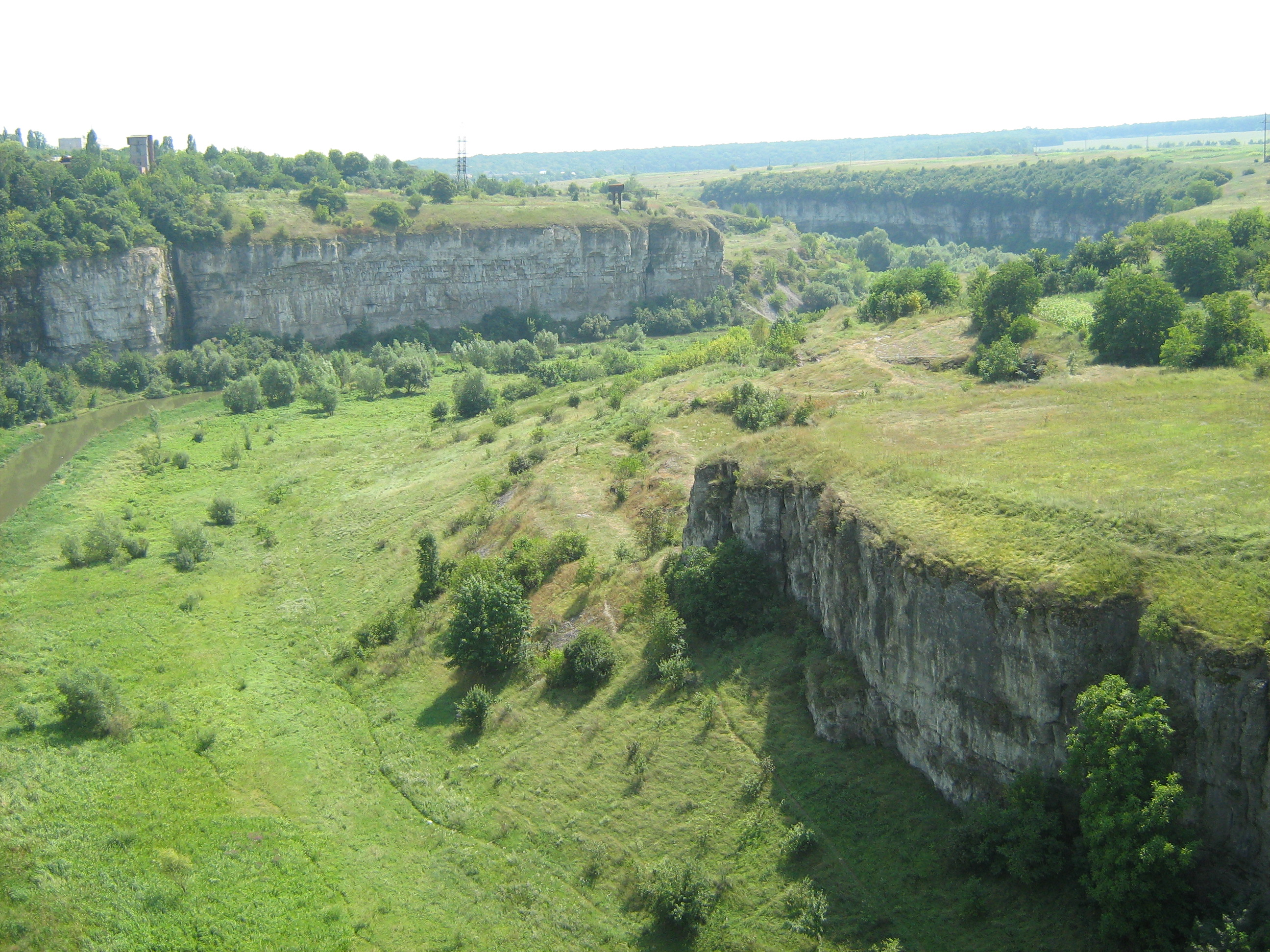
Smotrych Canyon (Tovtry)

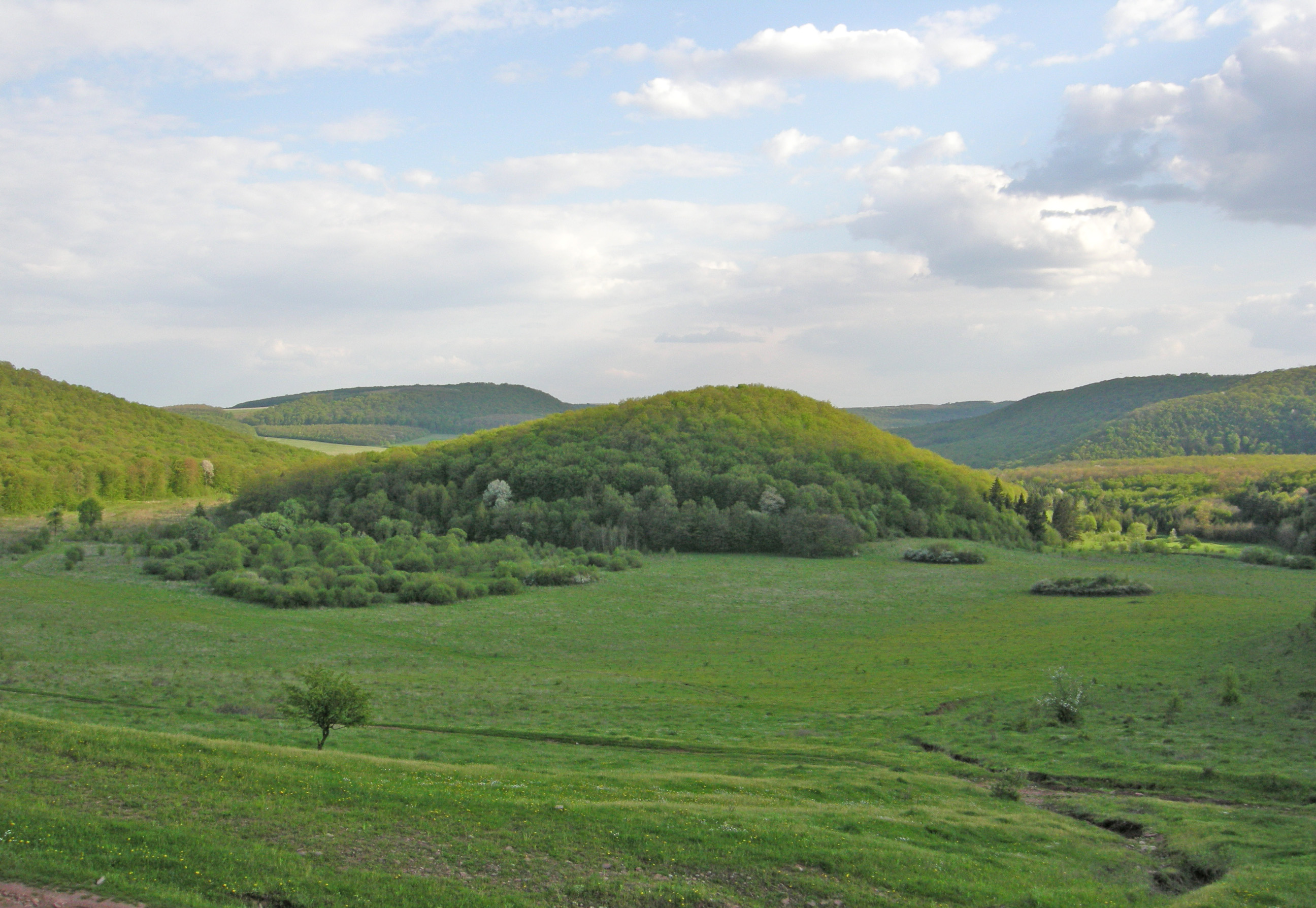
Great Hovda Hill

== See also ==
- Dniester Canyon
- Optymistychna Cave
