= Bardach =

Bardach (Hebrew: ברד״ח) is a surname. Notable people with the surname include:

- Ann Louise Bardach (born 1950), American journalist and author
- Eugene Bardach American public policy scholar
- Georgina Bardach (born 1983), Argentine swimmer
- Janusz Bardach (1919–2002), author and plastic surgeon
- Judah (Julius) Bardach (1828–1897), Russian writer and educator
- Juliusz Bardach (1914–2010), Polish legal historian
