= Judah Bardach =

- Born: 24 April 1828; Turijsk, Volhynia, Russian Empire
- Died: 1897 (aged 68–69)
- Occupations: Writer, translator, educator
- Relatives: Yakov Bardach (son); Juliusz Bardach (grandson); Janusz Bardach (grandson)
- Writing career
- Language: Hebrew, Russian

Judah (Julius) Bardach (Hebrew: יהודה ברד״ח, romanized: Yehudah Bardaḥ, Russian: Юлий Меирович Бардах, romanized: Yuliy Meirovich Bardakh; 24 April 1828 – 1897) was a Russian Jewish writer, translator, and educator.

== Biography ==
Judah Bardach was born in Turijsk, Volhynia. He was believed to be descended from the Taz, who was known as BaRDaḤ in his youth (a moniker derived from the initials of בן ר׳ דוד חריף). His father was the author of Ta'ame Torah (Vilna, 1822) and of other unpublished works. Bardach received his initial education in Hebrew grammar, the Tanakh, and Talmud from his father. He also acquired a sufficient level of secular knowledge to pass examinations for teaching Hebrew and Russian.

In 1851, Bardach was appointed as an instructor at the government-run Jewish school in Khotin, Bessarabia. After three years he went to teach in Izmail. In 1857, he assumed the role of instructor at the Talmud Torah in Odessa, which position he held until 1882. In 1871, he was appointed government censor of Hebrew books, a role he held until his death. He also served as an instructor of Jewish religion in some of Odessa's high schools. For his contributions, the Russian government awarded him the title of hereditary honorary citizen.

Besides numerous works on the Hebrew and Aramaic languages and other subjects, Bardach also contributed numerous articles in both Hebrew and Russian to publications such as Ha-Maggid, Ha-Shaḥar, and Razsvyet.

== Publications ==
- Ḥiḳre leshon Arami. Odessa. 1865. Studies in the Aramaic language.
- Mazkir li-vne ReSHeF. Vienna: J. Schlossberg. 1869. Catalogue of the Hebrew and Arabic manuscripts left by Simḥah Pinsker.
- O Yevreiskom Sklonenii Pinskera. Odessa: P. Franzova. 1886.
- A Russian translation of Geiger's Lehrbuch zur Sprache der Mischnah (Odessa, 1871).
- Polny Kurs Yevreiskavo Zakonoycheniya. A complete course in Jewish religion, unpublished.
- A Russian translation of the siddur and Haggadah, unpublished.
- O Yevreiskoi Stilistikye. On Hebrew style, unpublished.
