= David Menefee-Libey =

American political scientist

David J. Menefee-Libey
- Born: August 13, 1958 (age 68); International Falls, Minnesota
- Education: St. Olaf College, University of Chicago
- Scientific career
- Fields: Political science, Public policy analysis
- Workplaces: Community Renewal Society, RAND Corporation, Pomona College

David Menefee-Libey (born August 13, 1958) is an American political scientist and public policy analyst. He is the William A. Johnson Professor of Government at Pomona College in Claremont, California.

== Early life and education ==
Menefee-Libey was born on the US-Canada border in International Falls, Minnesota in 1958. He earned a Bachelor of Arts degree from St. Olaf College in 1980, and attended the University of Chicago., where he earned Master of Arts and then his PhD Degree in Political Science in 1989.

== Career ==
From 1981 to 1986, while in graduate school, Menefee-Libey worked at the "Community Renewal Society"., "a faith-based, community organizing and public policy organization that works with congregations in and around Chicago to address issues of racism and poverty." He was a Research Fellow at the Brookings Institution in 1986-87 and an Associate Social Scientist at the Washington, DC office of the RAND Corporation in 1987-1989.

Menefee-Libey joined the Pomona College faculty in 1989, and served as Coordinator of the college's Program in Public Policy Analysis for many years. He won the college's Wig Distinguished Professor Award for Excellence in Teaching seven times, a record he shares with two colleagues. In 1999-2000 he participated in the Fulbright Program as a Visiting Fulbright Scholar at the University of Limerick in the Republic of Ireland.

In July 2022, he was appointed the William A. Johnson Professor of Government, an endowed chair.

== Scholarly work ==
Menefee-Libey's scholarly work focuses primarily on the politics of elementary and secondary school policymaking in the United States; and campaigns and elections in the United States.

== Personal life ==
Menefee-Libey lives in Claremont, California with his family.

== Selected books, articles, and papers ==
- Menefee-Libey, David; Herrington, Carolyn; Choi, Kyoung-Jun; Marsh, Julie; Bulkley, Katrina (December 2023). "Bending Without Breaking: COVID-19 Tests the Resilience of State Education Policymaking Institutions". Ed Working Papers, Annenberg Exchange. doi:10.26300/rph8-8j04.
- Menefee-Libey, David (November 2015). "High School Civics Textbooks: What We Know Versus What We Teach About American Politics and Public Policy". Journal of Political Science Education. 11 (4). doi:10.1080/15512169.2015.1072051.
- Menefee-Libey, David; Kerchner, Charles Taylor (March 2015). "California's first year with local control finance and accountability". Education Policy Analysis Archives. 23. doi:10.14507/epaa.v23.2022.
- Menefee-Libey, David (2010). "Neoliberal School Reform in Chicago? Renaissance 2010, Portfolios of Schools, and Diverse Providers". Between Public and Private: Politics, Governance, and the New Portfolio Models for Urban School Reform. By Bulkley, Katrina E.; Henig, Jeffrey R.; Levin, Henry M. Harvard Education Press. ISBN 978-1-9347-4269-3.
- Kerchner, Charles T.; Menefee-Libey, David J.; Mulfinger, Laura Steen; Clayton, Stephanie E. (2010). Learning from L.A.: Institutional Change in American Public Education. Harvard Education Press. ISBN 978-1-934742-02-0.
- Menefee-Libey, David J. (2000). The Triumph of Campaign-Centered Politics. Chatham House Publishers. ISBN 9781889119199.
- Menefee-Libey, David (August 1997). "Education as a Basic Industry". Education and Urban Society. 4 (29). doi:10.1177/0013124597029004002.
