= Eightfold Way =

Eightfold Way may refer to:

- Noble Eightfold Path, Buddhist doctrine
- Eightfold Way (physics), particle-physics theory
- Eightfold Path (policy analysis)
