= Volodymyr, Ukraine =

City in Volyn Oblast, Ukraine

Volodymyr Володимир
- City
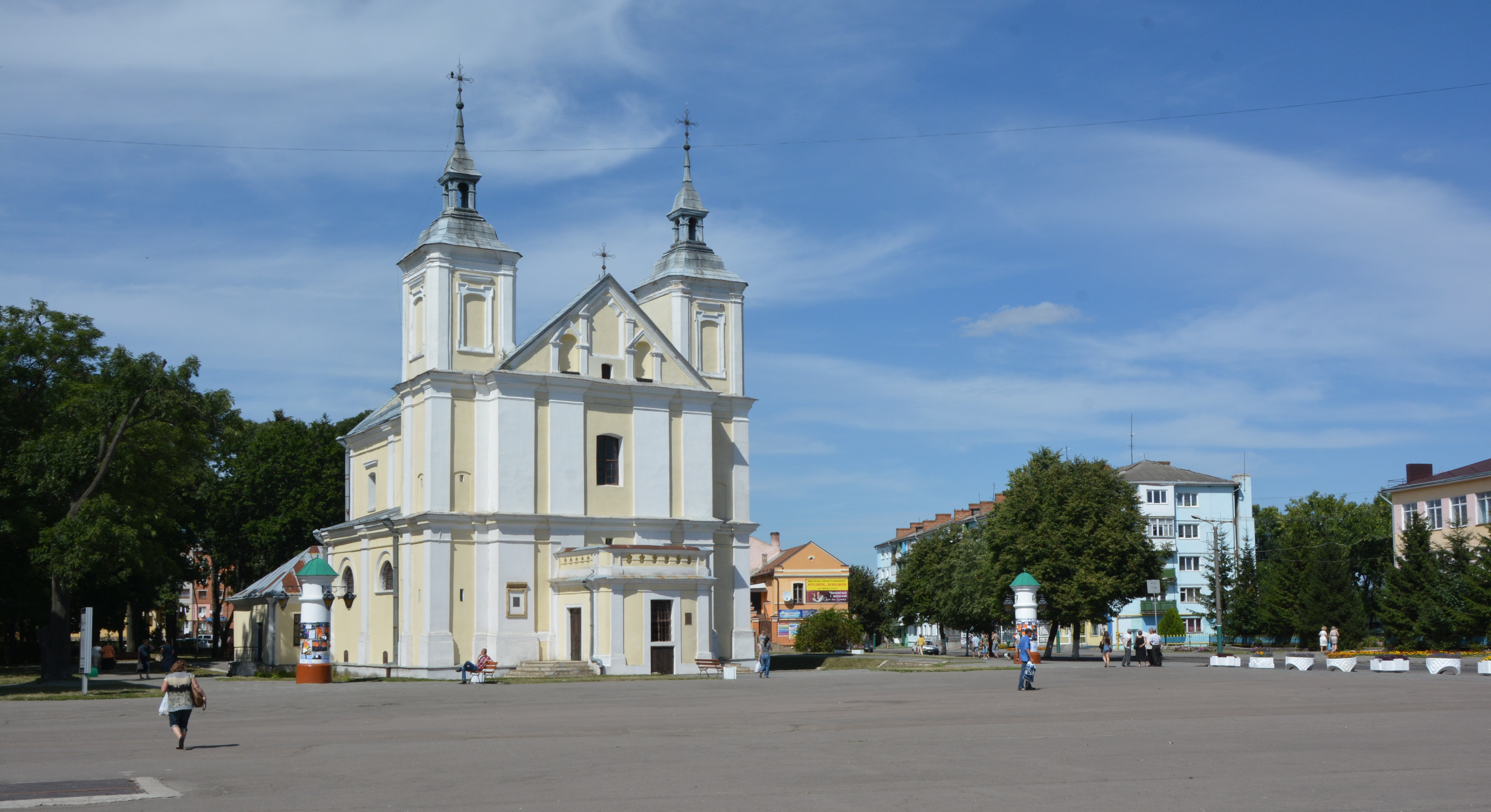
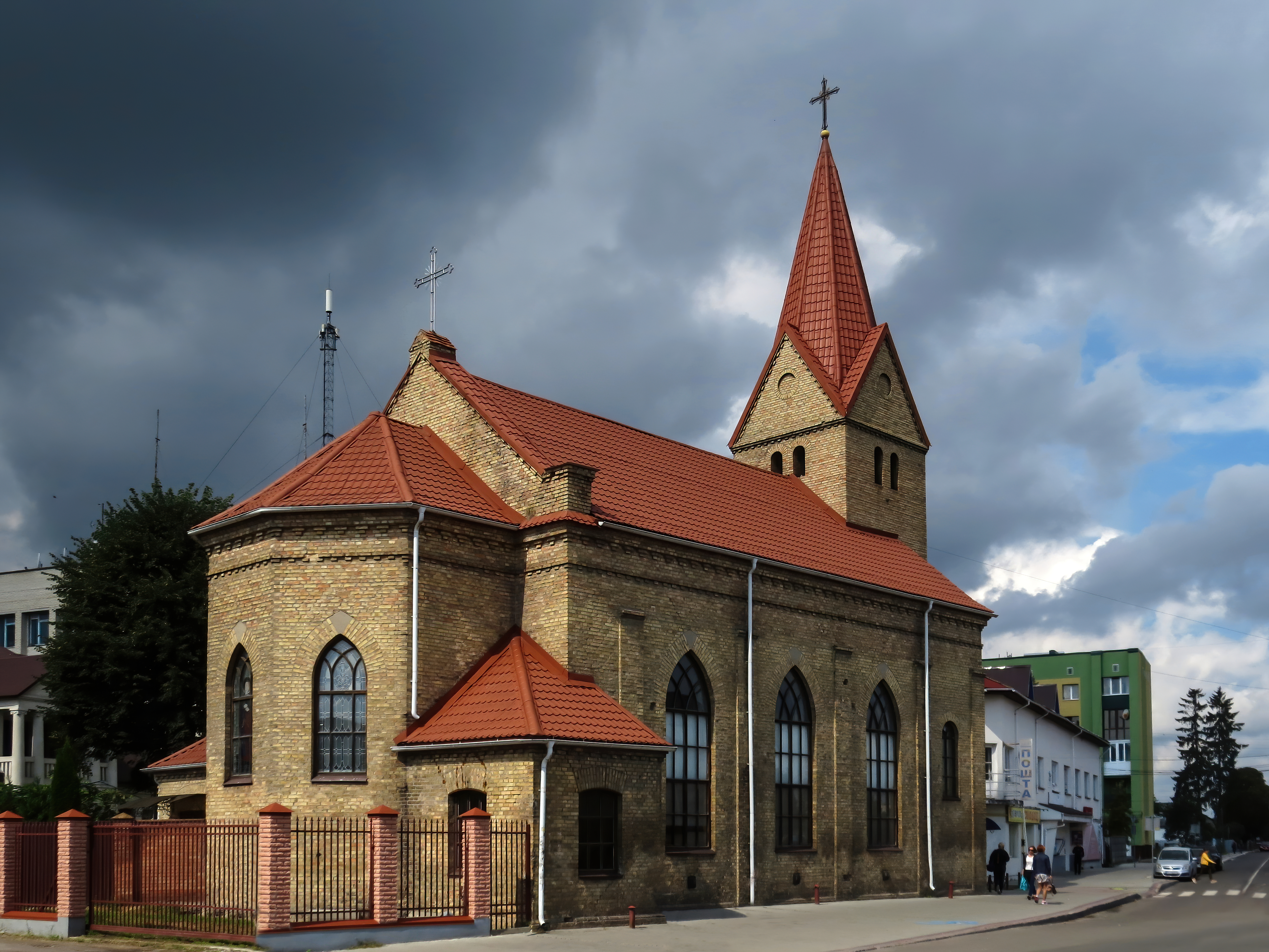
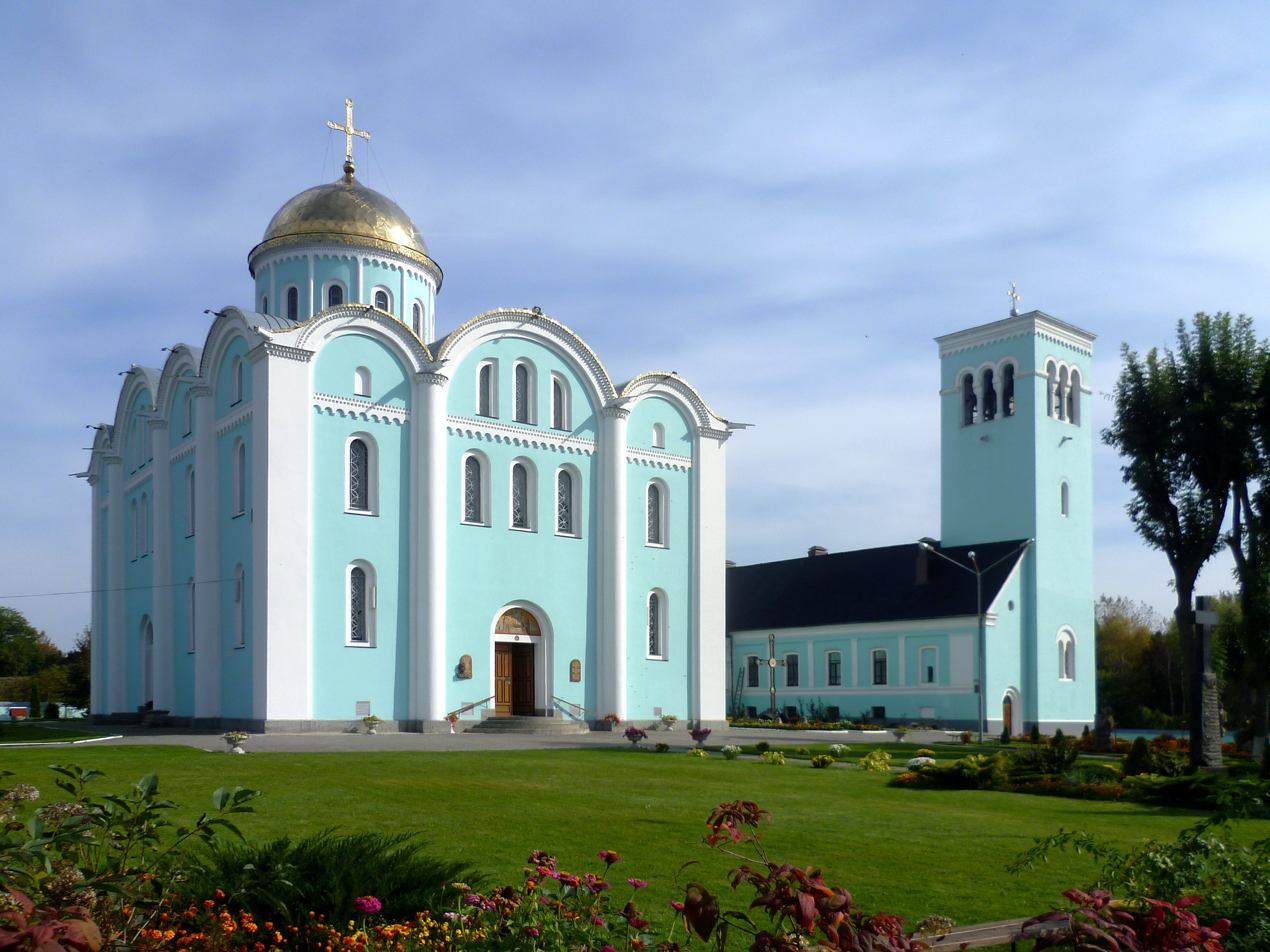
- Church of Sts. Joachim and Anne Lutheran Church Dormition Cathedral and Bishop's Palace

- Flag Coat of arms

- Location of Volodymyr Volodymyr (Ukraine)
- Coordinates: 50°50′53″N 24°19′20″E
- Country: Ukraine
- Oblast: Volyn Oblast
- Raion: Volodymyr Raion
- Hromada: Volodymyr urban hromada
- First mentioned: 988

Government
  - Mayor: Ihor Palyonka
- Elevation: 174 m (571 ft)

Population (2022)
  - Total: ▲37,910
  - Estimate (2023): ▲38,164
- Time zone: UTC+2 (EET)
  - Summer (DST): UTC+3 (EEST)
- Postal index: 44700-44709
- Area code: +380 3342
- Website: volodymyrrada.gov.ua

Volodymyr (Ukrainian: Володимир, IPA: [woloˈdɪmɪr]), previously known as Volodymyr-Volynskyi (Володимир-Волинський) from 1944 to 2021, is a small city in Volyn Oblast, northwestern Ukraine. It serves as the administrative centre of Volodymyr Raion and the center of Volodymyr urban hromada. It is one of the oldest cities in Ukraine and the historic centre of the region of Volhynia; it served as the capital of the Principality of Volhynia and later as one of the capital cities of the Kingdom of Galicia–Volhynia. Population: 37,910 (2022 estimate).

The medieval Latin name of the town "Lodomeria" became the namesake of the 19th century Austro-Hungarian Kingdom of Galicia and Lodomeria, of which the town itself was not a part. Five kilometres (three miles) south from Volodymyr is Zymne, where the oldest Orthodox monastery in Volhynia is located.

== Name ==
The city was named after Vladimir the Great (Volodymyr the Great), who was born in the village of Budiatychi, about 20 km from Volodymyr, and later also abbreviated Lodomeria, Ladimiri. Following the partitions of Poland and the annexation of Volhynia by the Russian Empire in 1795, it was called Volodymyr-Volynskyi (Vladimir-Volynsky) to distinguish it from Vladimir-on-Klyazma. The name was not in use between 1919 and 1939 when the city was again part of Poland. In 1944, the name Volodymyr-Volynskyi was restored.

On 1 October 2021, the city council voted to drop the regional qualifier and change the name of the city to just Volodymyr. The decision had to be ratified by Ukraine's national parliament (Verkhovna Rada) to take effect. On 14 December 2021 parliament approved the name change (it was supported by 348 out of 424 people's deputies). The city of Vladimir in Russia opposed the name change, claiming that there can be only one city called Vladimir.

Over the centuries its residents and rulers have used various names:

- German: Wolodymyr
- Latin: Lodomeria, Lodomir
- Old Church Slavonic: Владимирь, romanized: Vladimirĭ
- Old East Slavic: Володимѣрь, romanized: Volodiměrĭ
- Ruthenian: Володимєръ, romanized: Volodimer
- Polish: Włodzimierz, Włodzimierz Wołyński
- Russian: Владиміръ, Владиміръ-Волынскъ, Владимир-Волынск, Владимир-Волынский, romanized: Vladimir, Vladimir-Volynsk, Vladimir-Volynsky
- Ukrainian: Володимир, Володимир-Волинськ, Володимир-Волинський, romanized: Volodymyr, Volodymyr-Volyns'k, Volodymyr-Volyns'kyj
- Belarusian: Уладзімер, Уладзімер-Валынск, Уладзімер-Валынскі, romanized: Uładzimier, Uładzimier-Vałynsk, Uładzimier-Vałynski
- Yiddish: לודמיר, romanized: Ludmir

== History ==
=== Origins and Kievan period ===
The city is one of the oldest towns in Ukraine. The origin of the name Volodymyr is uncertain. The city is first mentioned in two 12th-century sources: the Gesta Hungarorum and the Primary Chronicle (PVL). The Gesta mentions under the year 884 that the Magyars first arrived in Kiev (modern Kyiv), moved westward and stayed in the city of Lodomir for two weeks before finally settling in Pannonia (in the region of present-day Hungary). The PVL mentions the city for the first time under the year 988, when Volodimer I had just conquered Kiev and appointed as prince his son Vsevolod in Volodimer (Old East Slavic: Вьсеволода въ Володимери). This suggests, on the one hand, that the city already existed and, on the other hand, that the city already had this name, not that Volodimer I renamed the already existing city after himself shortly after his takeover. Either way, it became a stronghold of his reign.

Starting from 1146, Volodymyr served as the capital of the Principality of Volhynia. In 1160, the building of the Cathedral of Dormition of the Holy Mother of God was completed. By the 13th century, the city became part of Galicia–Volhynia as one of the most important trading towns in the region. According to a contemporary chronicle, king Andrew II of Hungary, who campaigned in the town's vicinity, was impressed by Volodymyr's powerful defences, claiming that he had never seen a city like that even in German lands. After being conquered by Batu Khan in 1240, the city was under the rule of the Mongol Empire, together with other principalities in Rus'. In 1241, the Mongol army gathered near the town before the First Mongol invasion of Poland.

=== Polish and Lithuanian period ===
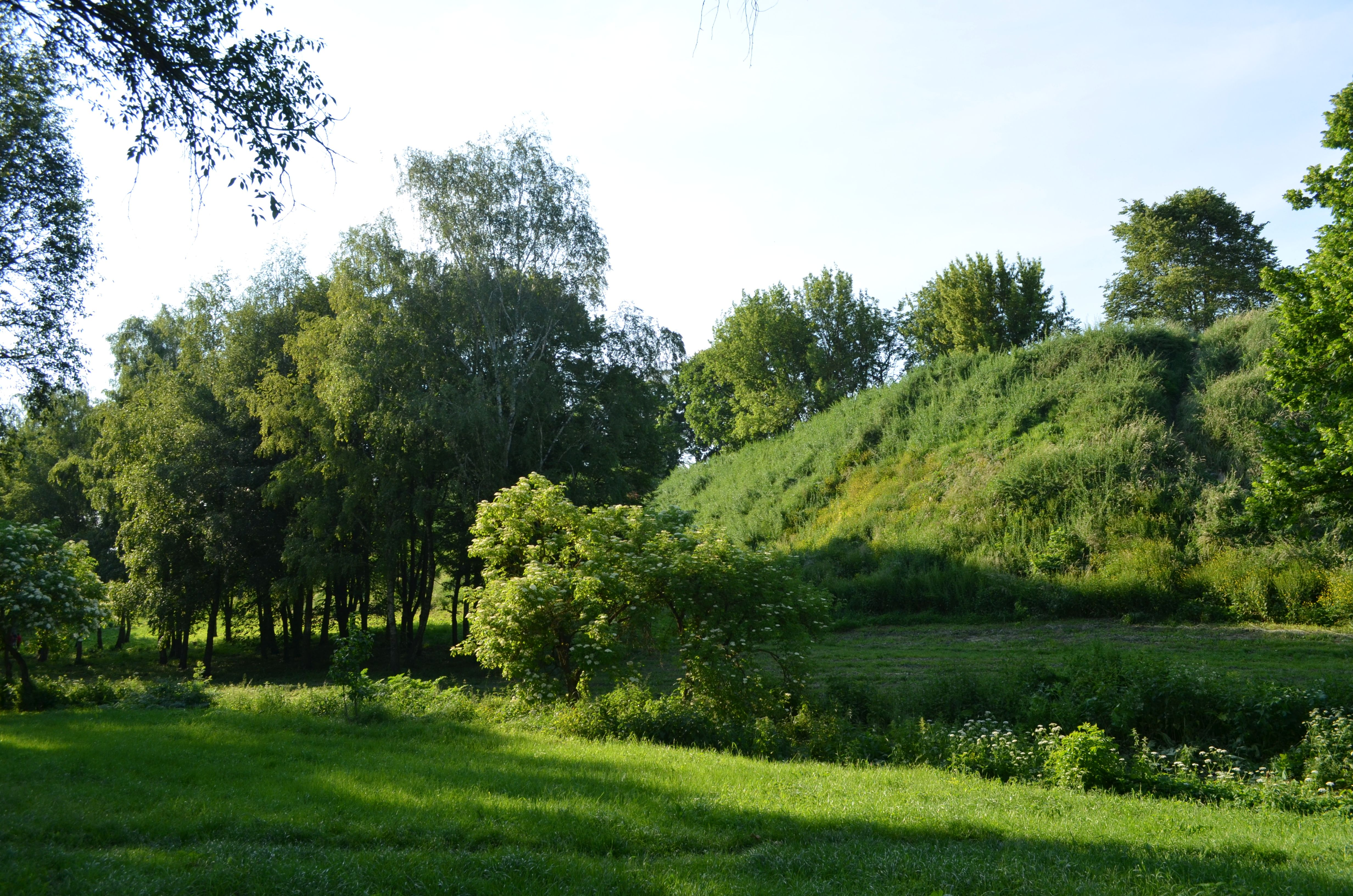
Earth mounds of the former castle

Starting from the early 14th century, Volodymyr served as a capital of Galicia-Volhynia. Metropolitan of Kiev and all Rus', Theognostus, resided in the city for several years before moving to Moscow. From the middle of the century, Volodymyr became engulfed by wars between Polish and Lithuanian rulers. In 1349, the Polish king, Casimir the Great, captured the city, and subsequently it became part of the Kingdom of Poland. The Polish king began building a castle, destroyed by Lithuanians after 1370, and established a Catholic bishopric in the city (known as Włodzimierz), later transferred to nearby Lutsk, which in the 15th century instead of Volodymyr became the leading city and capital of Volhynia. In 1370, it was taken by the Grand Duchy of Lithuania (after 1386, part of the Polish–Lithuanian Union) and it was not until the Union of Lublin of 1569 that it returned to the Crown of Poland. In the meantime, the city was given Magdeburg town rights in 1431. In 1491 and 1500, it was invaded by Tatars.

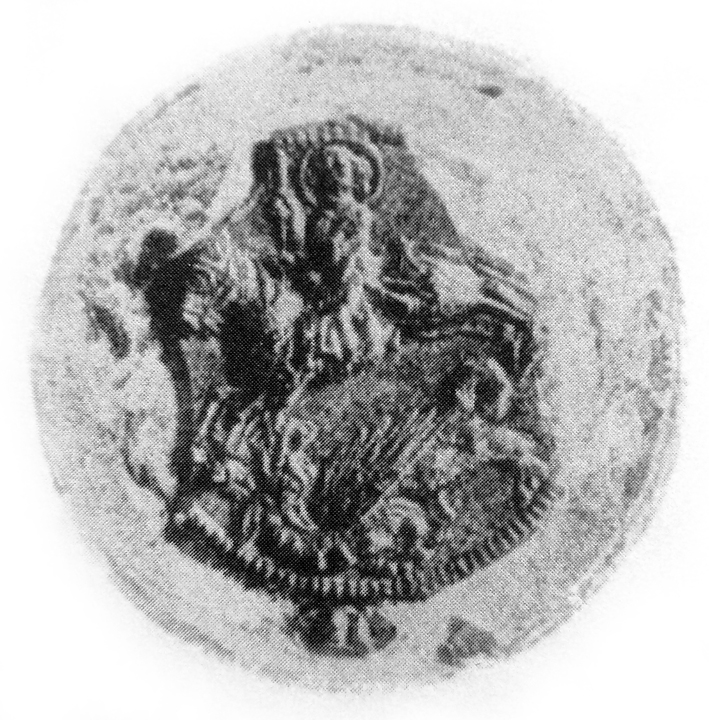
14th-century seal

From 1566 to 1795 it was part of the Volhynian Voivodeship. It was a royal city of Poland. Most of the city's landmarks were built at that time, including the Baroque church of St. Joachim and St. Anne, the Jesuit church, the Dominican monastery and the chapel of St. Josaphat. In 1577 prince Konstanty Wasyl Ostrogski established a school in Volodymyr. During the 18th century a Basilian collegium functioned in the city. It also served as a garrison town, with the 6th Polish Infantry Regiment stationed there in 1790, and the 2nd Polish National Cavalry Brigade stationed there in 1794.

On 17 July 1792, the Battle of Włodzimierz took place in the vicinity of the town: a numerically inferior Polish force led by Tadeusz Kościuszko defeated a Russian army.

=== Imperial Russian period ===
The city remained a part of Poland until the Third Partition of Poland of 1795 when the Russian Empire annexed it. That year the Russian authorities changed the name of several cities in Volhynia, including Zviahel, which became Novohrad-Volynskyi. Volodymyr-Volynskyi stayed within the Russian Partition until 1917. In the 19th century, as part of anti-Polish repressions, the Russians demolished the Dominican church and Capuchin monastery, and the former Jesuit and then Basilian church was converted into an Orthodox church.

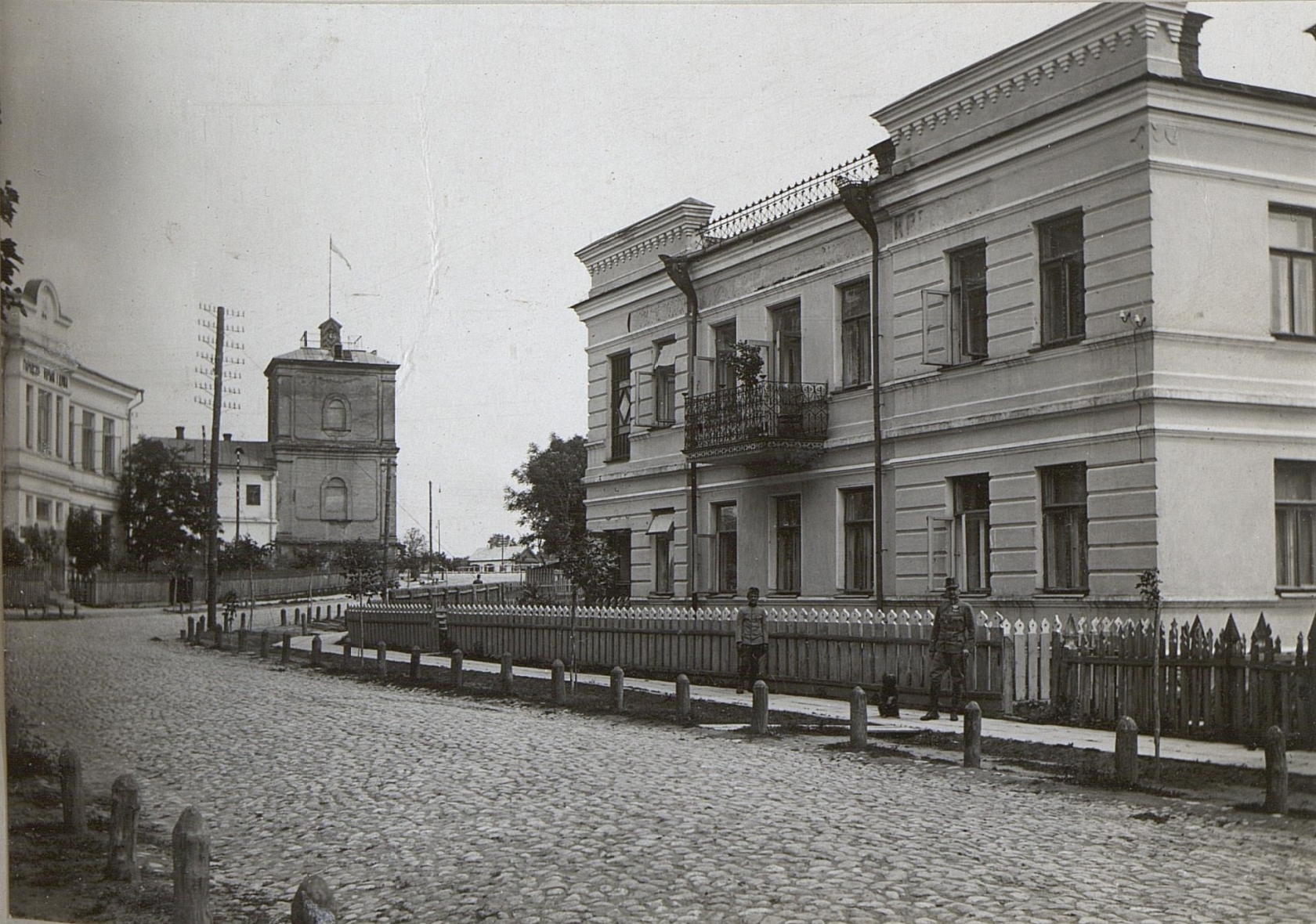
Volodymyr during World War I

In the 18th and 19th centuries the town started to grow rapidly, mostly thanks to large numbers of Jews settling there as part of the Pale of Settlement. By the second half of the 19th century, they made up the majority of the population. According to the Geographical Dictionary of the Kingdom of Poland, in the late 19th century, the city had 8,336 inhabitants, 6,122 of them Jews. In 1908, the railway station was opened.

=== First World War and aftermath ===
In 1915 Volodymyr was occupied by Austrian troops. In 1916 the city's first Ukrainian school was established by Ukrainian Sich Riflemen. In 1918 Volodymyr was the stationing point of the Greycoat Division. Immediately after World War I, the area became disputed by the newly formed Second Polish Republic, Bolshevist Russia, and the Ukrainian People's Republic. On 23 January 1919, following battles against Ukrainian forces, the Polish 17th Infantry Regiment captured the city.

In the interbellum, the city was a seat of a powiat within the Volhynian Voivodeship of Poland and an important garrison was located there. According to the 1921 census, the population was 48.2% Jewish, 32.0% Polish, 16.8% Ukrainian, 2.6% Russian. In 1926, the Volyn Artillery Reserve Cadet School (Wołyńska Szkoła Podchorążych Rezerwy Artylerii) was established in Włodzimierz.

=== World War II ===
Following the Molotov–Ribbentrop Pact between Nazi Germany and the Soviet Union, and the start of World War II, the city was occupied by Soviet forces on 19 September 1939. The commander, adjutant, 15 instructors and two other staff members of the Volyn Artillery Reserve Cadet School were murdered by the Russians in the Katyn massacre in 1940.

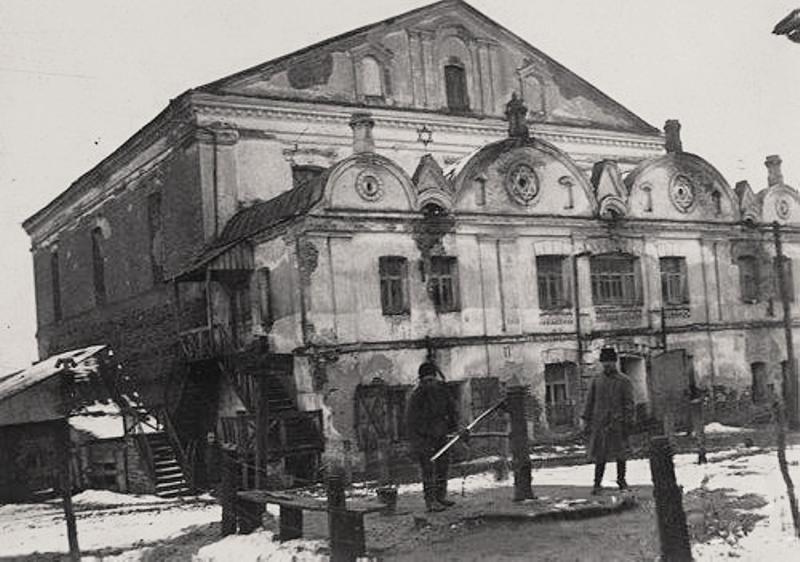
The Great Synagogue was set on fire by the Germans in 1942 and in the 1950s the remnants were completely razed by the Soviet regime.

On 23 June 1941, at the start of the German invasion of the Soviet Union, the city was occupied by Germany and attached to the Reichskommissariat Ukraine, and immediately the Jewish community of 11,554 began to be persecuted. Between 1–3 September 1942, 25,000 Jews from the local area were shot at Piatydni. On 13 November 1942, the Germans killed another 3,000 Jews from the town near Piatydni. During World War II, a German concentration camp was located near the city. About 140 Jews returned to the city after the war but most later emigrated. By 1999, only 30 remained.

From September 1941, the Germans operated the Oflag XI-A prisoner-of-war camp in the town, which was reorganized as Stalag 365 in April 1942. In September 1943, Stalag 365 was relocated to Novara, Italy.

In 1943, the city became a shelter for Poles escaping massacres carried out by Ukrainian nationalists of the Ukrainian Insurgent Army (UPA). Attacks by the UPA took place mainly in the suburbs. Poles were defended both by the Polish police established with the consent of the Germans and an illegal self-defense unit. In the city, Poles suffered from overpopulation, hunger and diseases. According to later research by Władysław Siemaszko and Ewa Siemaszko, a total of 111 Poles were killed in a dozen UPA attacks. The city was liberated by the Red Army on 20 July 1944 and annexed to the Ukrainian SSR. After the war, the vast majority of Polish residents was displaced to the post-war Polish territories. Units of the Ukrainian Insurgent Army continued their activities around the city until 1946.

=== Postwar period ===
Under the Soviet rule, Volodymyr became the centre of Volodymyr Raion. During that period the development of Lviv–Volyn coal basin started in the vicinity. Food and light industry developed in the city during the postwar era. A Cold War air base was located north-east of the town at Zhovtnevy.

Since 1991, the city has been part of independent Ukraine.

==== Discovery of mass graves from World War II ====
A series of mass graves was discovered in the area of the city in 1997, with exhumations completed by 2013. Originally thought to be an example of NKVD mass murder, similar to the Katyn massacre and the Vinnytsia massacre, the Volodymyr-Volynskyi murders were shown in 2012 to have been carried out by German forces, most likely the Einsatzgruppen C. The primary archeological evidence for German culpability was that most of the bullet shell casings were dated 1941 and were from a German factory. Testimony by a Jewish survivor of the city, Ann Kazimirski (née Ressels), who lived on Kovelska Street, recorded by the USC Shoah Foundation corroborated the view that the perpetrators were German and that the victims were primarily Jewish. Anthropological analysis of the remains led to the conclusion that three quarters of the victims were women and children. The 747 victims were reinterred in local city cemeteries.

== Geography ==
=== Climate ===
Climate data for Volodymyr-Volynskyi (1981–2010)
Month	Jan	Feb	Mar	Apr	May	Jun	Jul	Aug	Sep	Oct	Nov	Dec	Year
Mean daily maximum °C (°F)	0.0 (32.0)	1.2 (34.2)	6.3 (43.3)	14.0 (57.2)	20.1 (68.2)	22.5 (72.5)	24.6 (76.3)	24.1 (75.4)	18.7 (65.7)	13.0 (55.4)	5.9 (42.6)	1.1 (34.0)	12.6 (54.7)
Daily mean °C (°F)	−2.9 (26.8)	−2.1 (28.2)	2.0 (35.6)	8.4 (47.1)	14.1 (57.4)	16.9 (62.4)	18.8 (65.8)	18.0 (64.4)	13.2 (55.8)	8.2 (46.8)	2.7 (36.9)	−1.5 (29.3)	8.0 (46.4)
Mean daily minimum °C (°F)	−5.7 (21.7)	−5.4 (22.3)	−1.7 (28.9)	3.1 (37.6)	8.1 (46.6)	11.1 (52.0)	13.1 (55.6)	12.1 (53.8)	8.2 (46.8)	4.1 (39.4)	−0.2 (31.6)	−4.2 (24.4)	3.6 (38.5)
Average precipitation mm (inches)	33.8 (1.33)	35.3 (1.39)	36.5 (1.44)	42.9 (1.69)	66.8 (2.63)	81.4 (3.20)	92.9 (3.66)	66.8 (2.63)	61.2 (2.41)	42.7 (1.68)	43.5 (1.71)	39.2 (1.54)	643.0 (25.31)
Average precipitation days (≥ 1.0 mm)	9.2	9.8	9.2	8.1	9.0	9.8	10.1	8.0	9.0	7.4	9.6	10.1	109.3
Average relative humidity (%)	85.5	83.9	79.0	70.6	70.4	73.5	74.3	75.1	80.0	81.6	85.9	87.2	78.9
Source: World Meteorological Organization

== Demographics ==
As of the 2001 Ukrainian census, Volodymyr (formerly Volodymyr-Volynskyi) had a population of 37,982 inhabitants. The distribution of the population by ethnicity and native language according to the census was as follows:

Ethnic groups in Volodymyr
	percent
Ukrainians	93.89%
Russians	4.99%
Belarusians	0.49%
Poles	0.17%
Armenians	0.06%
others	0.40%

Native languages in Volodymyr
	percent
Ukrainian	94.5%
Russian	5.2%
Belarusian	0.1%
others	0.1%

== Culture ==
=== Churches ===
Historic churches (examples)

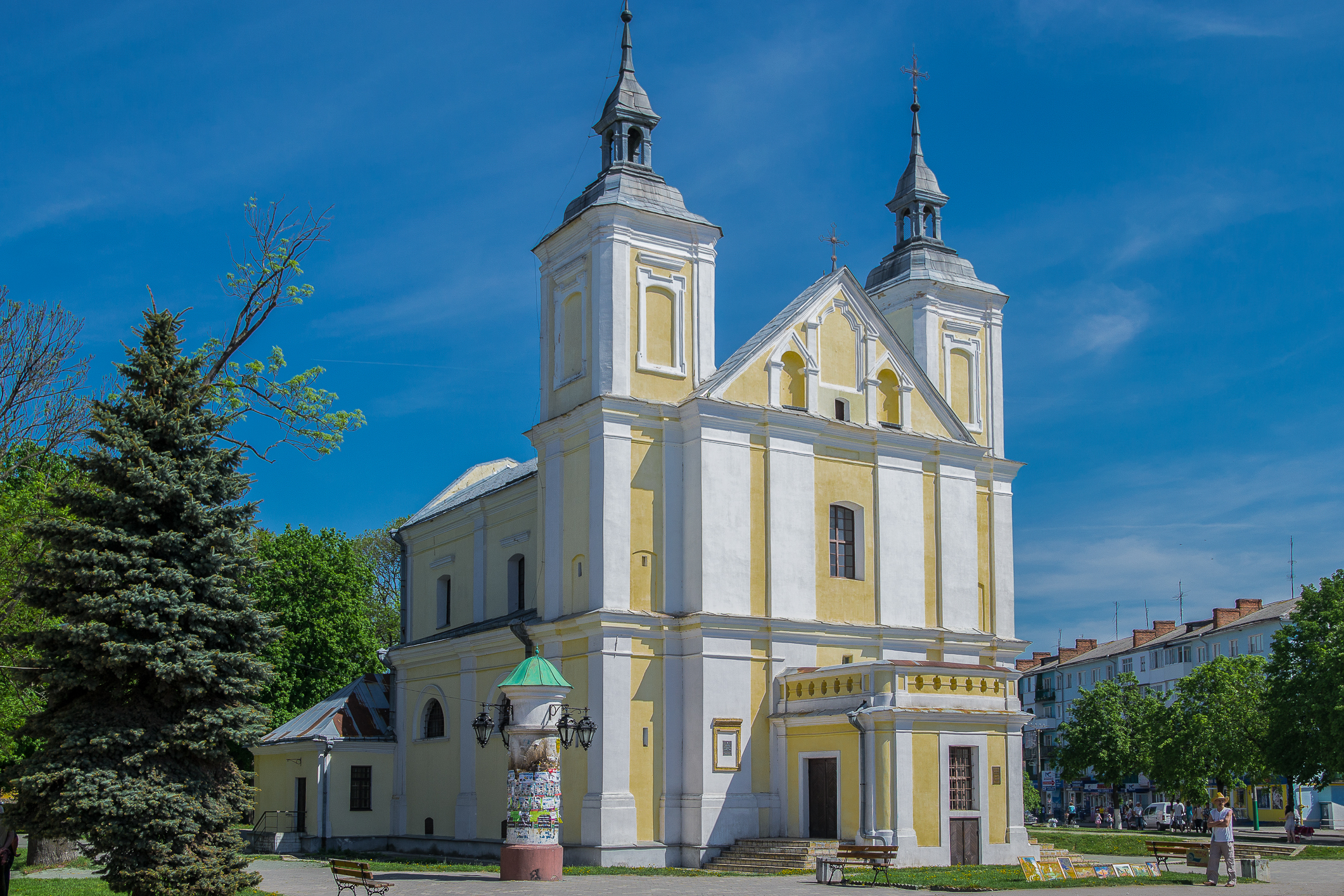
Baroque Church of St. Joachim and St. Anne

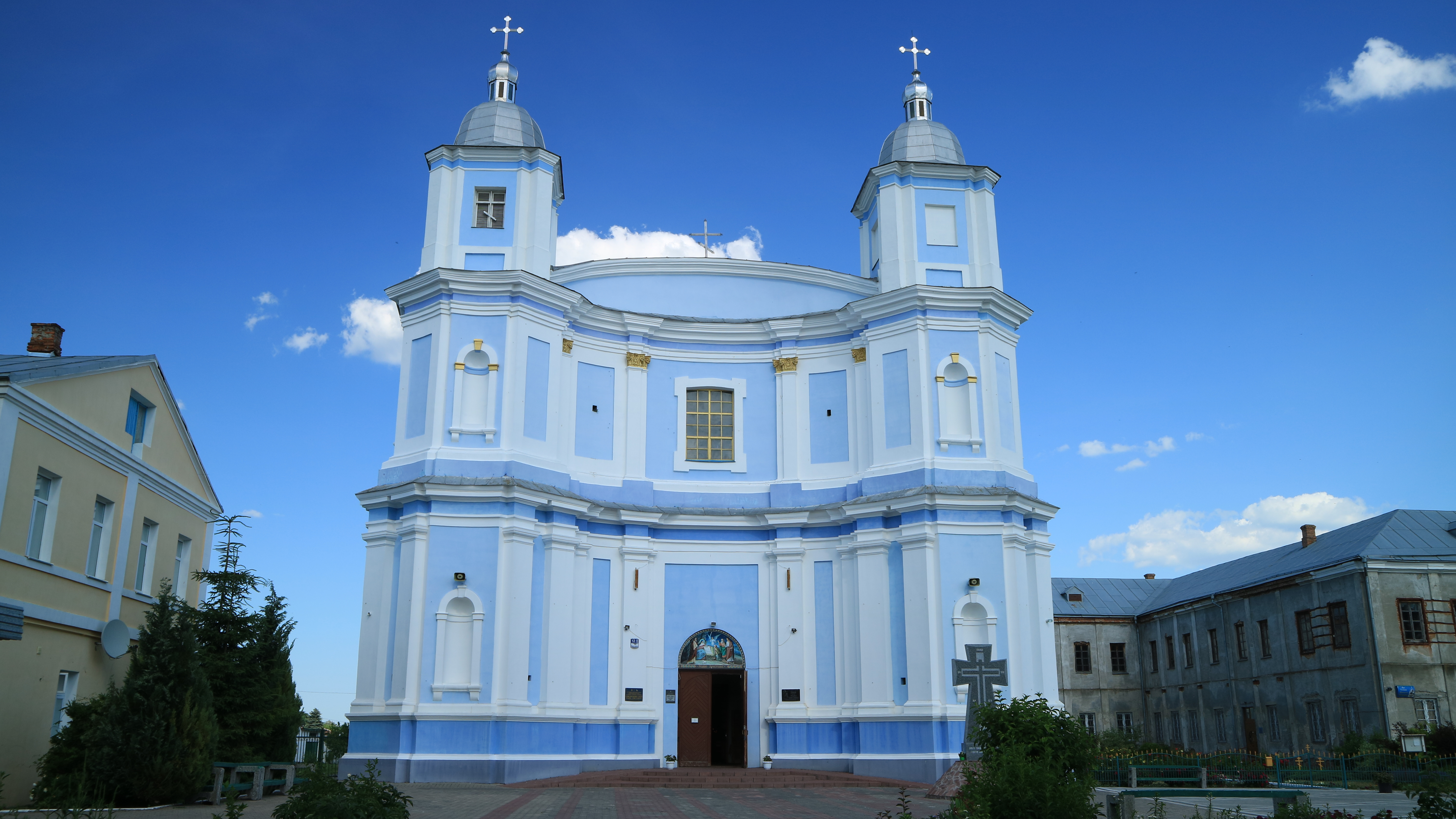
Baroque former Jesuit church, now the Orthodox Cathedral of the Nativity of Christ

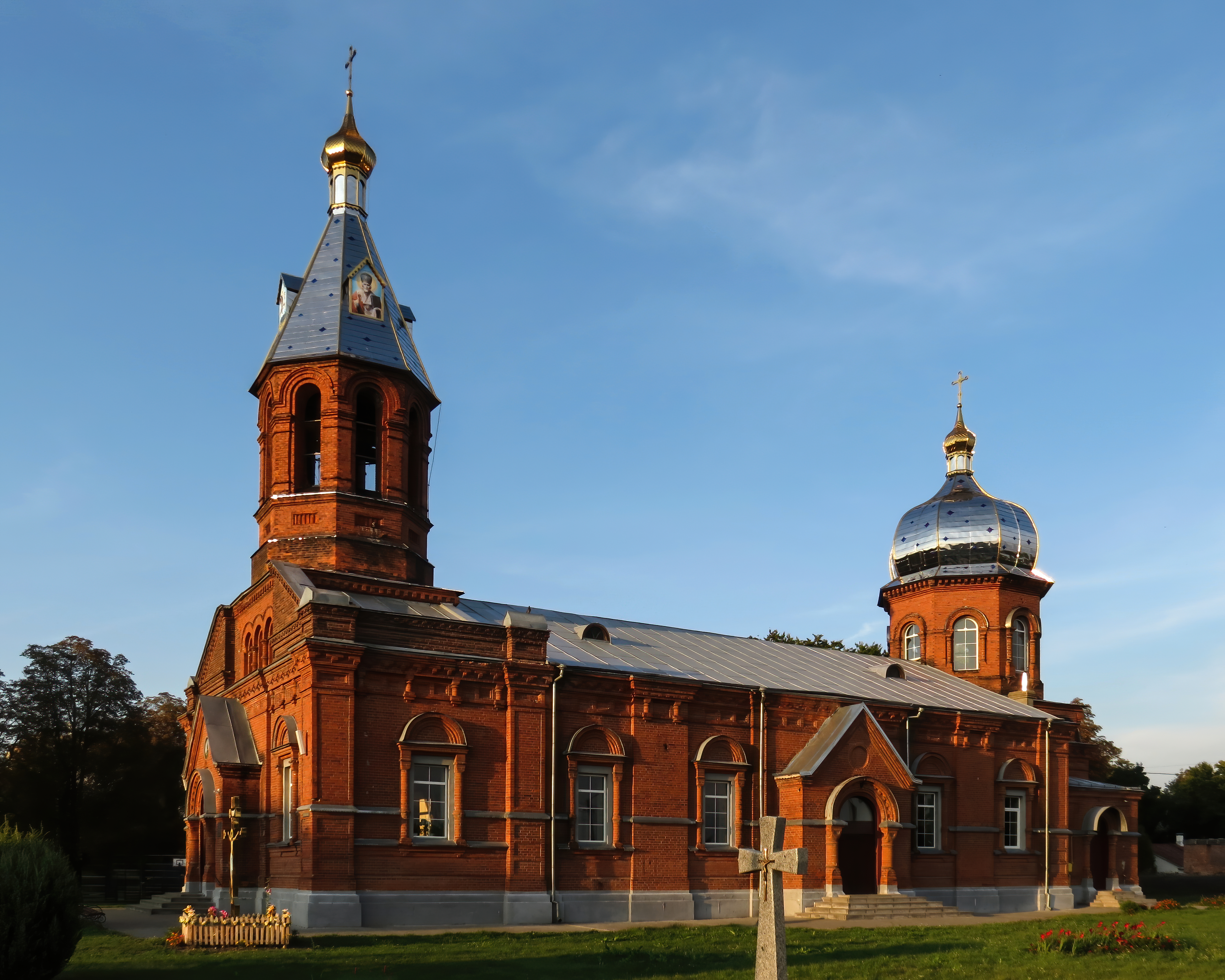
Saint George church

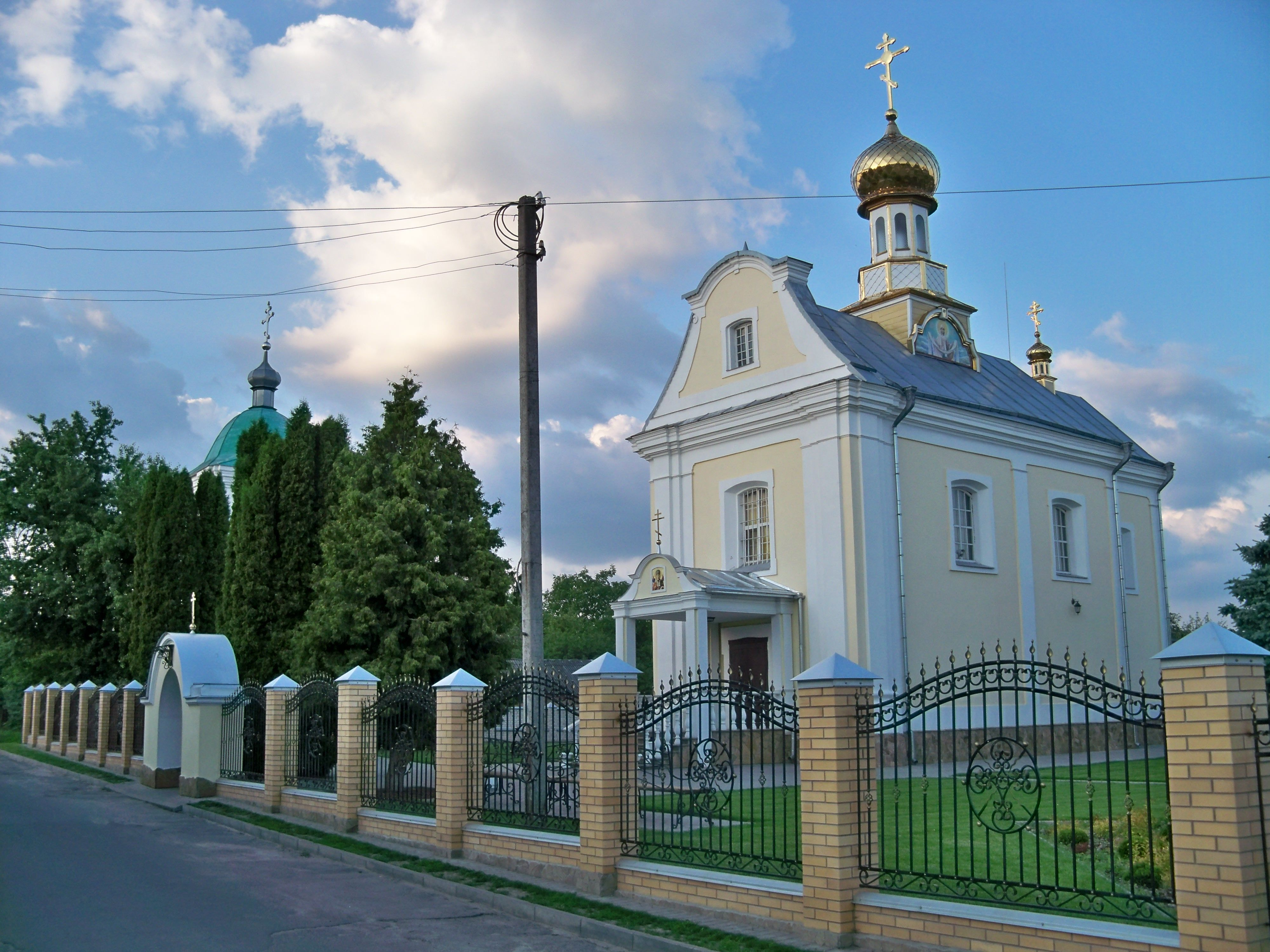
Baroque Saint Nicolas church

The oldest place of worship in the town is the Temple of Volodymyr, erected several kilometres from the modern town's centre and first mentioned in a chronicle (letopis) of 1044. The oldest existing church is the Dormition of the Mother of God built by Mstyslav Izyaslavovych in 1160. By the late 18th century it fell into disuse and finally collapsed in 1829, but was restored between 1896 and 1900. The third of the old Orthodox churches is the Eastern Orthodox Basil the Great's cathedral, which was erected in the 14th or 15th century, though local legends attribute its construction to Volodymyr the Great, who supposedly built it some time after 992.

In 1497, Duke Alexander Jagiellon erected a Catholic church of Holy Trinity and a Dominican monastery. In 1554, another wooden Catholic church was founded by Princess Anna Zbaraska, which was later replaced by a new St. Joachim and Anna's church in 1836. In 1755, a Jesuit church was erected there by the starost of Słonim Ignacy Sadowski and, in 1780, the Greek Catholic Josaphat's church was added to the list. Following the Russian Empire's takeover of the town, in the effect of the Partitions of Poland, both shrines were confiscated and donated to the authorities of the Orthodox Church, which converted them to an Orthodox monastery and church, respectively, while the Dominican monastery was converted to an administrative building.

=== Museum ===
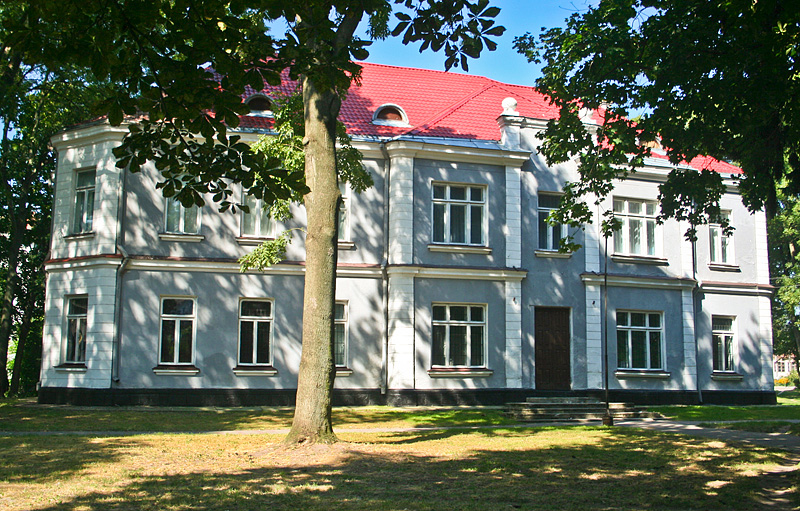
Volodymyr Historical Museum

There also exists Volodymyr Historical Museum, an architectural monument of the 19th century.

== International relations ==
=== Twin towns - Sister cities ===
Volodymyr is twinned with:

- Dubno, Ukraine
- Korosten, Ukraine
- Hrubieszów, Poland
- Kętrzyn, Poland
- Łęczyca, Poland
- Malbork, Poland
- Zwickau, Germany

== Notable people ==
- Josaphat Kuntsevych – archeparch (archbishop) of the Ukrainian Greek Catholic Church, also a martyr and saint of the Catholic Church
- Amtylochius – bishop and saint of Eastern Orthodox Church
- Ipatii Potii – bishop, writer, and humanist, also co-founder and supporter of the Union of Brest
- Wacław Hipsz – protonotary apostolic of the Catholic Church and the Prefect of Secondary Education in Volodymyr-Volynsky until 1939
- Janusz Bardach – surgeon, Kolyma survivor, and memoirist
- Juliusz Bardach – legal historian and professor of the University of Warsaw.
- Alicja Bobrowska – model and actress, Miss Polonia in 1957
- Teresa Lewtak-Stattler – social activist, stalag prisoner, Councillor of the Warsaw Capital, and meritorious member of Polish Home Army who took part in special operations against German Nazi high-ranking officials in German-occupied Poland during World War II and was involved in underground humanitary aid to Jews from Warsaw Ghetto
- Józef Han – chairman of society of veterans of 27th Home Army Infantry Division (Poland) in Hrubieszów
- Ann Kazimirski (née Ressels) – Holocaust survivor, teacher, lecturer, and author of the autobiographical book Witness to Horror, in which she describes growing up in Volodymyr (Ludmir), surviving the Holocaust, and making a new life in Canada for her and her family
- Jerzy Strojnowski – psychiatrist, philosopher and writer, also professor and co-founder of Psychology Institute at John Paul II Catholic University of Lublin
- Jerzy Antczak – film director.
- Jan Tadeusz Stanisławski – writer, satirist, and actor
- Ahatanhel Krymsky – orientalist and polyglot being an expert in more than 34 languages
- Hannah Rachel Verbermacher (1805–1888), also known as the Maiden of Ludmir or the Ludmirer Moyd, the only independent female Rebbe in the history of the Hasidic movement

== Gallery ==
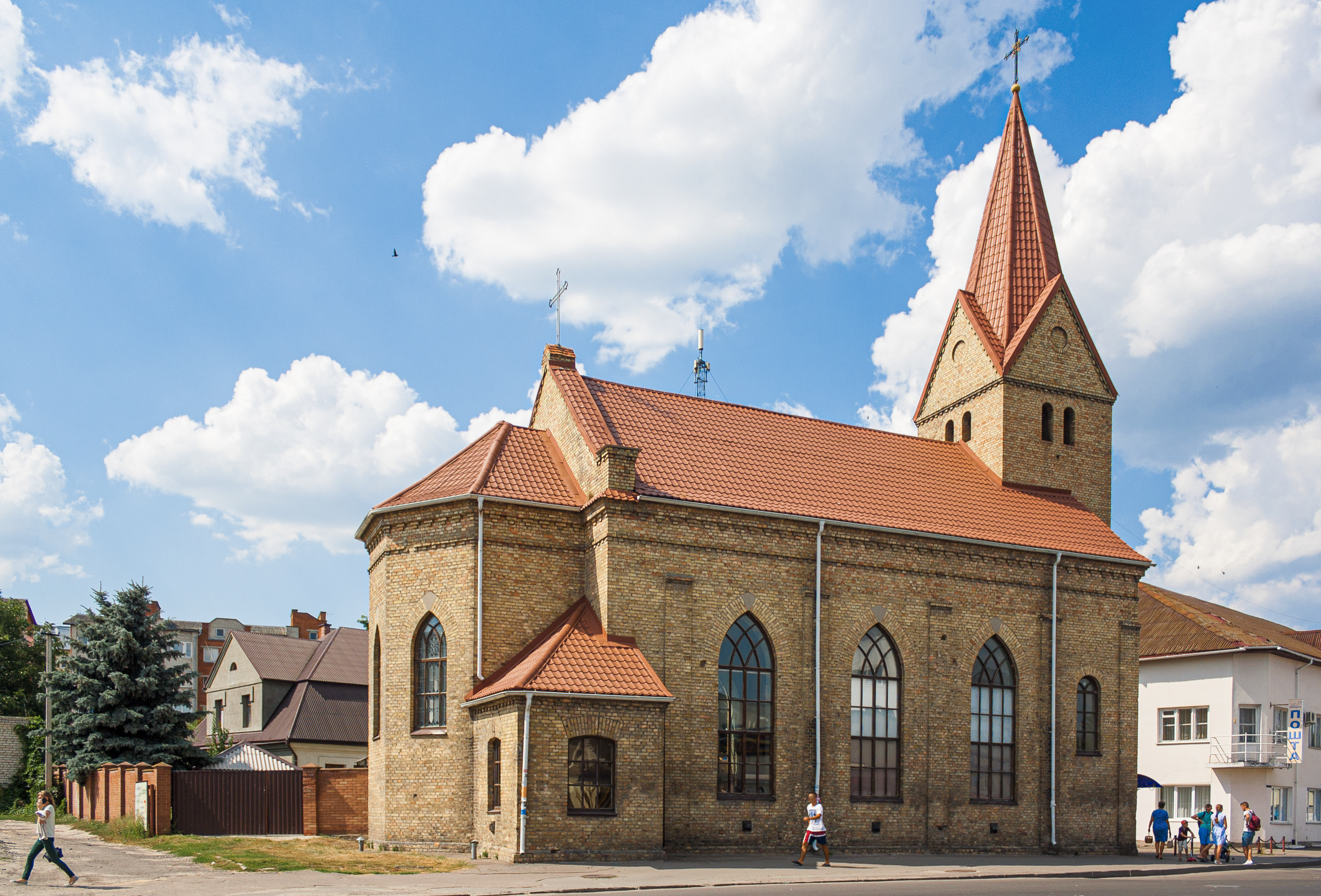
Greek-Catholic Saint Josaphat's Church (formerly Lutheran)

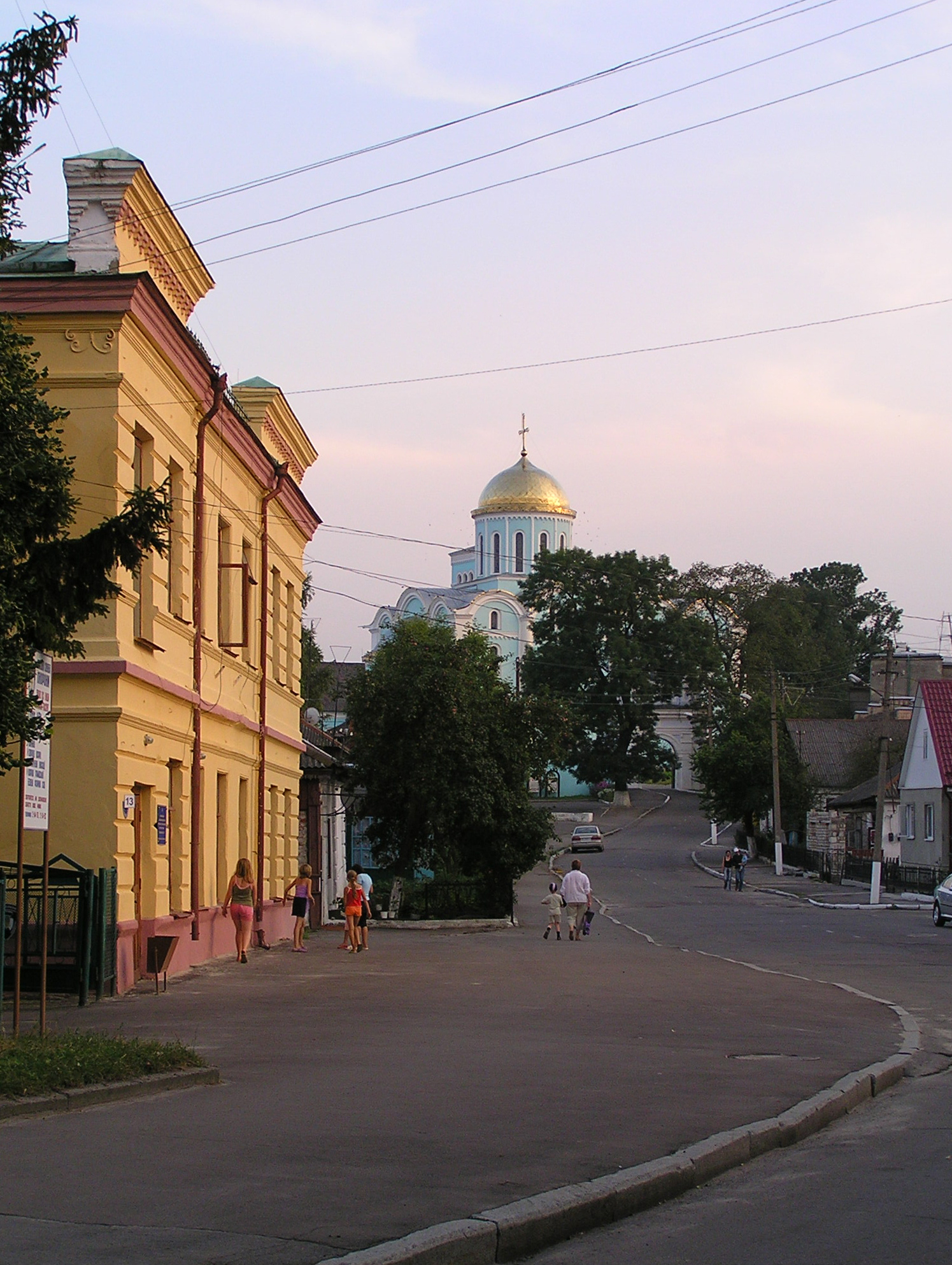
Soborna street

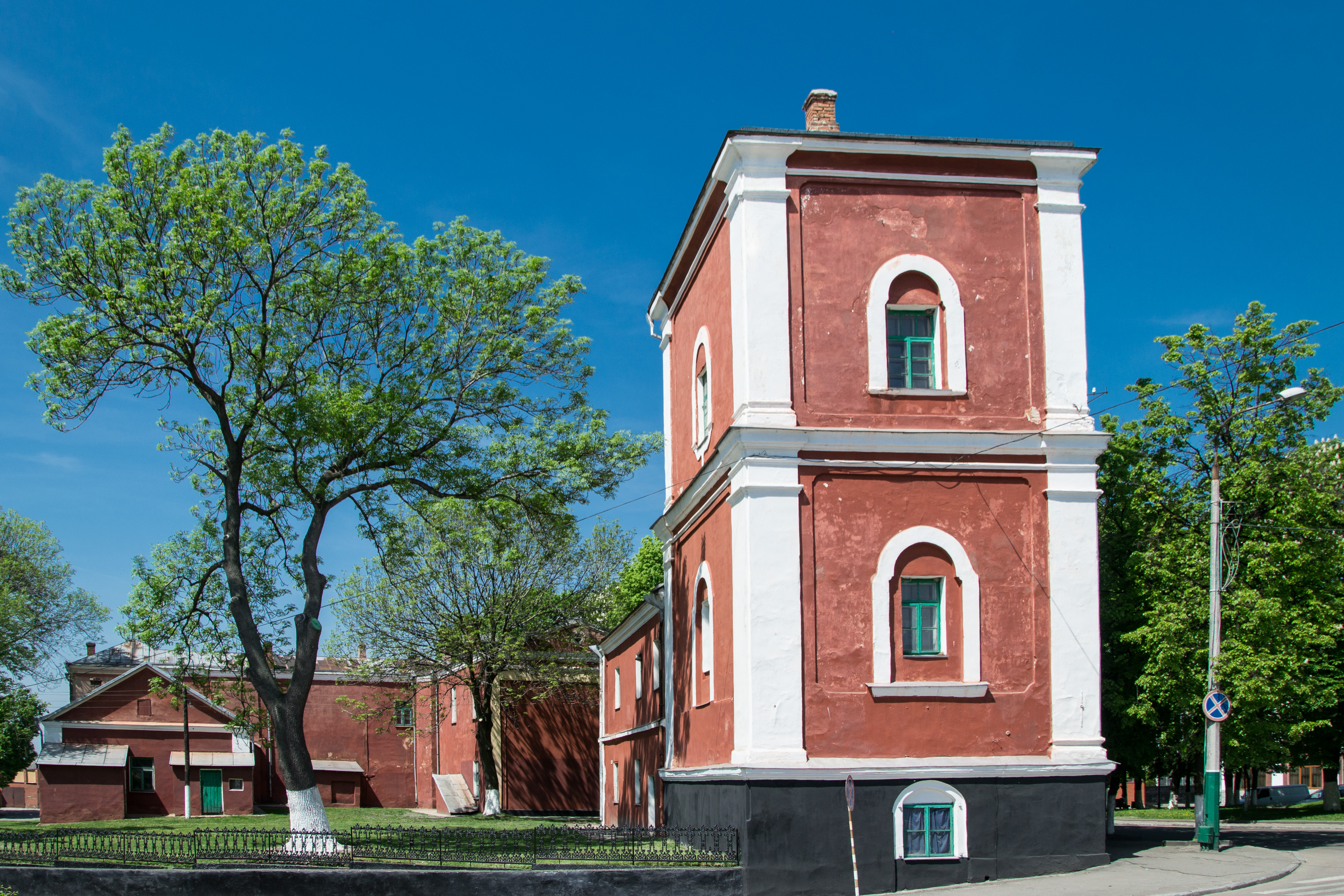
Former Border Guard headquarters

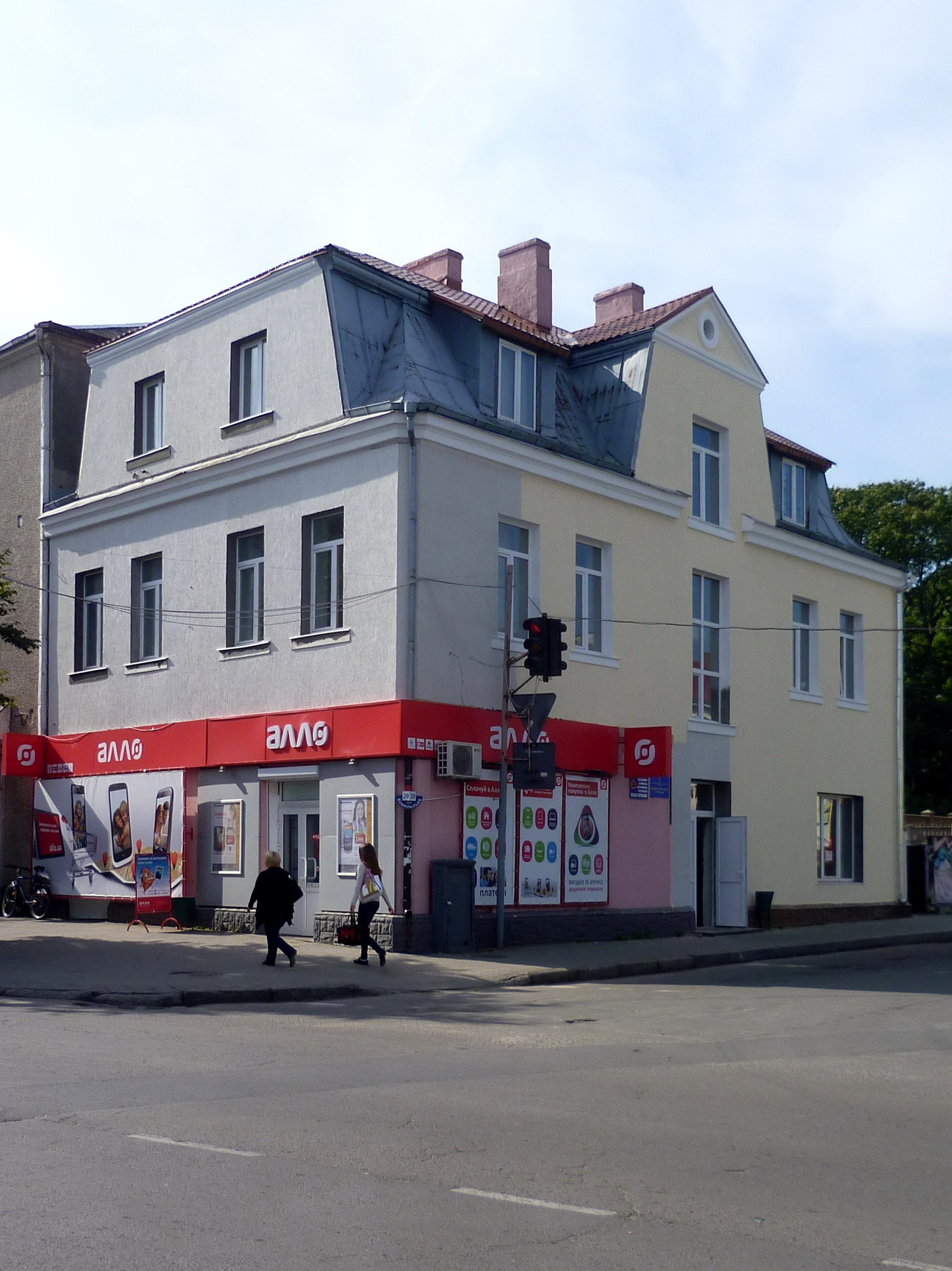
A building on Kovelska street

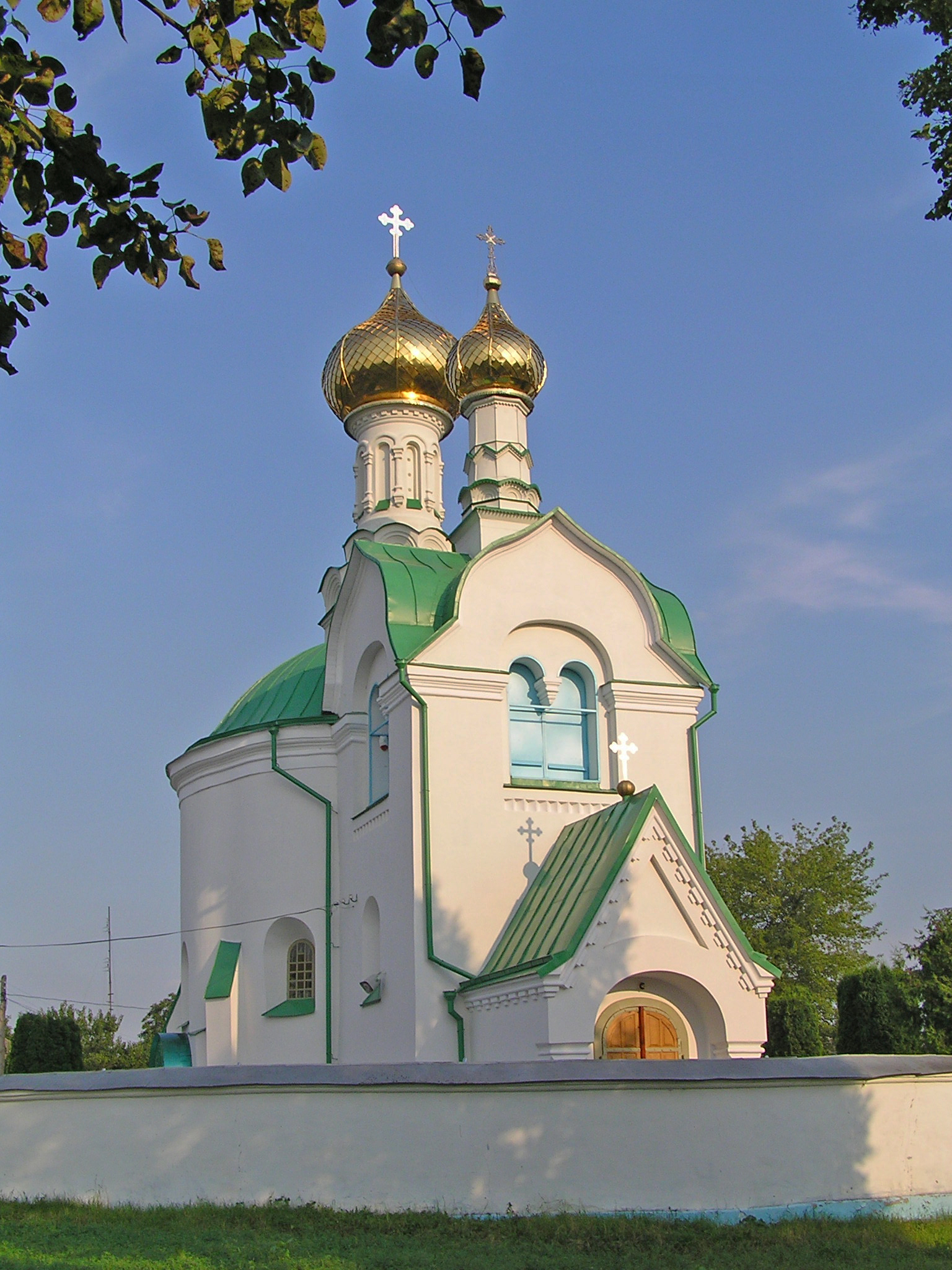
Saint Basil's Rotunda

== Link ==
Official Web site of the Volodymyr-Vohlynsky historical museum
