= A Practical Guide for Policy Analysis =

Book by Eugene Bardach

A Practical Guide for Policy Analysis: The Eightfold Path to More Effective Problem Solving is a nonfiction book of policy analysis assembled by Eugene Bardach, a professor at the Goldman School of Public Policy at the University of California, Berkeley. Eric Patashnik, a professor of public policy and political science at Brown University, joined as an author for the book's seventh edition published in 2023. This book's model of an eightfold path for policy analysis is commonly referenced in public policy and public administration scholarship.

== See also ==
- Eightfold path (policy analysis)
