= Political feasibility analysis =

Political feasibility analysis is used to predict the probable outcome of a proposed solution to a policy problem through examining the actors, events and environment involved in all stages of the policy-making process. It is a frequently used component of a policy analysis and can serve as an evaluative criterion in choosing between policy alternatives.

Feasible policies must be politically acceptable or at least not unacceptable. Political unacceptability is a combination of two conditions too much opposition or too little support. One common mistake is widespread in practice that feasibility becomes a dominant criterion of preferable alternative. Feasibility is "the state or degree of being easily or conveniently done". More plainly, one might ask "can we get this done?" Feasibility, as it pertains to the political arena, speaks to the political climate. The question then becomes: "In this political climate, can we get this done?"

Political feasibility is a measure of how well a solution to a policy problem, will be accepted by a set of decision makers and the general public. For a policy to be enacted and implemented, it must be politically acceptable, or feasible. A policy alternative's lack of political feasibility can often be attributed to its lack of political support or the result of controversy that may surround the issue the policy seeks to address. Alternatively, a politically feasible alternative is one that has the greatest probability of "receiv[ing] sufficient political push and support to be implemented" given any specific constraints.

When policy analysis generates policy alternatives, the political risks and costs associated with each can be important criteria for deciding between alternatives. A good policy alternative requires a certain amount of political feasibility, or implementation of the policy will be impossible. It is important to keep in mind, however, that feasibility alone does not make a policy "good". Examining all criteria is necessary for the implementation of socially responsible policy.

Politics are difficult to predict but it has been said that "no decision is ever made in complex systems without political feasibility having played some role."

== Steps ==
As every policy problem differs from the next, so do the elements involved in a political feasibility analysis. To begin, analysts work within a basic framework for their investigation. These basic steps, as identified by Arnold Meltsner are outlined in the following sections. David Weimer and Aidan Vining argue that in practice analysts should answer the questions iteratively, "moving among them as (the analyst) learn(s) more about the political environment", meaning that what happens at one stage of the process of identifying political feasibility can affect earlier stages.

=== Identify the policy's environment ===
The first step for the policy analyst is to identify the space in which the policy problem exists. This is generally a broad policy space, such as health policy or environmental policy. Next the analyst defines the specific policy issue area. In keeping with the example, the narrower policy issue area is renewable energy. Once this is done, the analyst can begin to identify the players involved in the policy. Within this step there are other considerations to include, such as the level of public awareness of the proposed policy, the dynamics created by the timing of the policy proposal, and the concerns and voting patterns of different demographics.

For an example, see the political feasibility analysis commissioned by the SF Bay Restoration Authority to assess support for a parcel tax that would raise funds for its efforts to restore the area's depleted wetlands.

=== Assemble and organize information ===
In this step, the analyst outlines political scenarios surrounding the proposed policy. The following factors should be identified with some detail. Further elements of the list can be tailored to fit the specific policy and its environment, if needed. Identifying key stakeholders is a crucial step forward on your way to putting a policy into action. Another important reason to identify actors is so the analyst can also identify the resources that actor has available to them. The list of resources identified by political scientists (material, symbolic, physical, position, information, and skills) satisfy motivations.

1. Key players: One needs information about who might promote, oppose, or remain neutral about the proposed policy. Key players may also be organizations or alliances. Actors are differentiated by their policy positions. The degree of polarization is a function of the particular issue area and context of decision-making.
2. Motivations: Determine the motives behind key players behavior toward the policy issue. Are they part of a coalition or a voting block? Are there political trade-offs involved? Monetary gain?
3. Belief systems: A key player's underlying belief system may be grounded in political ideology, religious beliefs, or professional experience. Understanding the underlying belief systems of key players may give insight into whether or not a particular policy alternative will be supported.
4. Resources: Key players use resources to gather support for their view and assemble coalitions. Resources are things like money, power, access to powerful individuals, or skillful lobbyists.
5. Site of action: Fixing the site of action—or arena—provides a reference point when discussing the actors, their motives and resources. The site of action may occur in a sub-committee, in a meeting with departmental heads, or at a meeting of a citizen's action group.

=== Analyze the data ===
Once the necessary information has been collected and an adequate description of the political climate has been provided, the analyst can offer an estimation of levels of support/opposition for the proposed policy. This includes identification of possible areas of political consensus and conflict, essentially determining what is necessary for the policy to gain the support for enactment and implementation.

There are three key steps to achieving this. First, the analyst may have to make a series of judgment calls. Within this stage of judgment comes the challenge of policy design and the issue of compromise. When drafting policy alternatives the analyst must consider what kind of exchanges among actors will be necessary to garner the required political support to pass a policy. The most desirable form of compromise is one that does not greatly change the intended impact of the proposal, and is sometimes possible depending on the details of the proposal. Second, it is important to have the specifications of the current political environment for a specific policy area, and what alternative proposals may be currently considered. One must also know who the political actors are and how they may be likely to support a proposed policy. Lastly, it is important to consider policy and political alternatives to protect against political error. In shaping a proposed policy alternative, one must remain focused on the intended purpose of the policy, and be aware of the real political climate for which it is to be proposed. Political feasibility is often an essential criterion for ensuring the adoption of a policy proposal, however depending on the nature of the policy and the environment, alternative components of thorough policy analysis and decision-making processes are necessary to come to this stage of the policy making process.

== Computer-assisted political analysis ==
In 1999, Harvard University professor Michael Reich introduced a prototype Windows-based software program for "computer-assisted political analysis" (CAPA) called PolicyMaker. PolicyMaker is designed to walk users through defining their desired policy, identifying the key actors, and determining the obstacles and opportunities in the policy environment. PolicyMaker then suggests strategies for making the policy more politically feasible and assesses the strategies' impacts on stakeholders. Harvard School of Public Health faculty, including Reich himself, have used PolicyMaker to teach a World Bank flagship health care course for policy analysts, as well as to train managers in health ministries and donor agencies. PolicyMaker 4 is available for free online.

== See also ==
- Stakeholder
