= Volodymyr Historical Museum =

Museum in Volodymyr-Volynsky, Ukraine

- Володимирський історичний музей
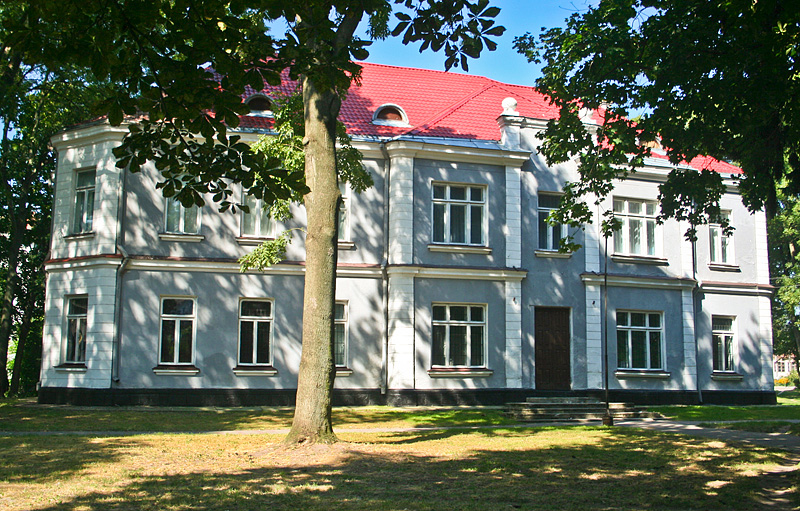
- Established: 1887
- Location: Ivana Franka St 6, Volodymyr, Ukraine
- Coordinates: 50°50′52.5″N 24°19′07.2″E
- Collection size: 18,000 exhibits
- Director: Vladimir Stemkovsky
- Website: volodymyrmuseum.com

Immovable Monument of Local Significance of Ukraine
- Official name: Житловий будинок (Residential building)
- Type: Architecture
- Reference no.: 2007-Вл

The Volodymyr Historical Museum was founded in 1887 in Volodymyr, Volyn Oblast, Ukraine.

== History ==
The Volodymyr Historical Museum owns one of the oldest collections of Volynian antiquities. The community of Volodymyr (formerly Volodymyr-Volynskyi) established the museum collection in order to preserve the history of the region and to promote scientific research. At the beginning of the 20th century, the museum collection included a diverse range of cultural items, including blackletter books, manuscripts (including a 16th century New Testament), icons, and coins. The museum was headed by the local nobleman and ethnographer enthusiast, O. Dvernytsky (1838–1906), the Head of the St. Volodymyr Fellowship.

During World War I many items were moved to museums of Kharkiv. In the period between World War I and World War II the museum moved to the buildings of a Dominican monastery, an architectural monument active during the 15th-18th century period.

== Collection ==
The museum collection consists of more than 18,000 items, including archeological finds, numismatic and ethnographic items, objects of arts and crafts, icons, documents, blackletter books, and photographic materials.

== Current status ==
Museum researchers attend ethnographic conferences, archeological and ethnographic expeditions, investigate the history of Volhynian land and educate local students. The museum also exhibits the works of local artists.

The museum joined the international project "Via Regia". The museum cooperates with other museums in Volyn Oblast and Rivne Oblast, Stefanyk Library of Lviv, and the museum of Kozłówka Palace (Poland).

As of 2011, the Museum Director was Vladimir Stemkovsky
