= Jan Baszkiewicz =

Polish historian (1930–2011)

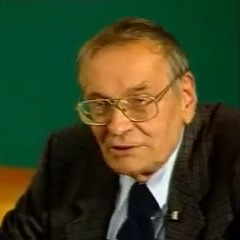
- Born: 3 January 1930; Warsaw
- Died: 27 January 2011 (aged 81); Warsaw
- Occupation: Historian

Academic background
- Education: University of Warsaw
- Doctoral advisor: Juliusz Bardach

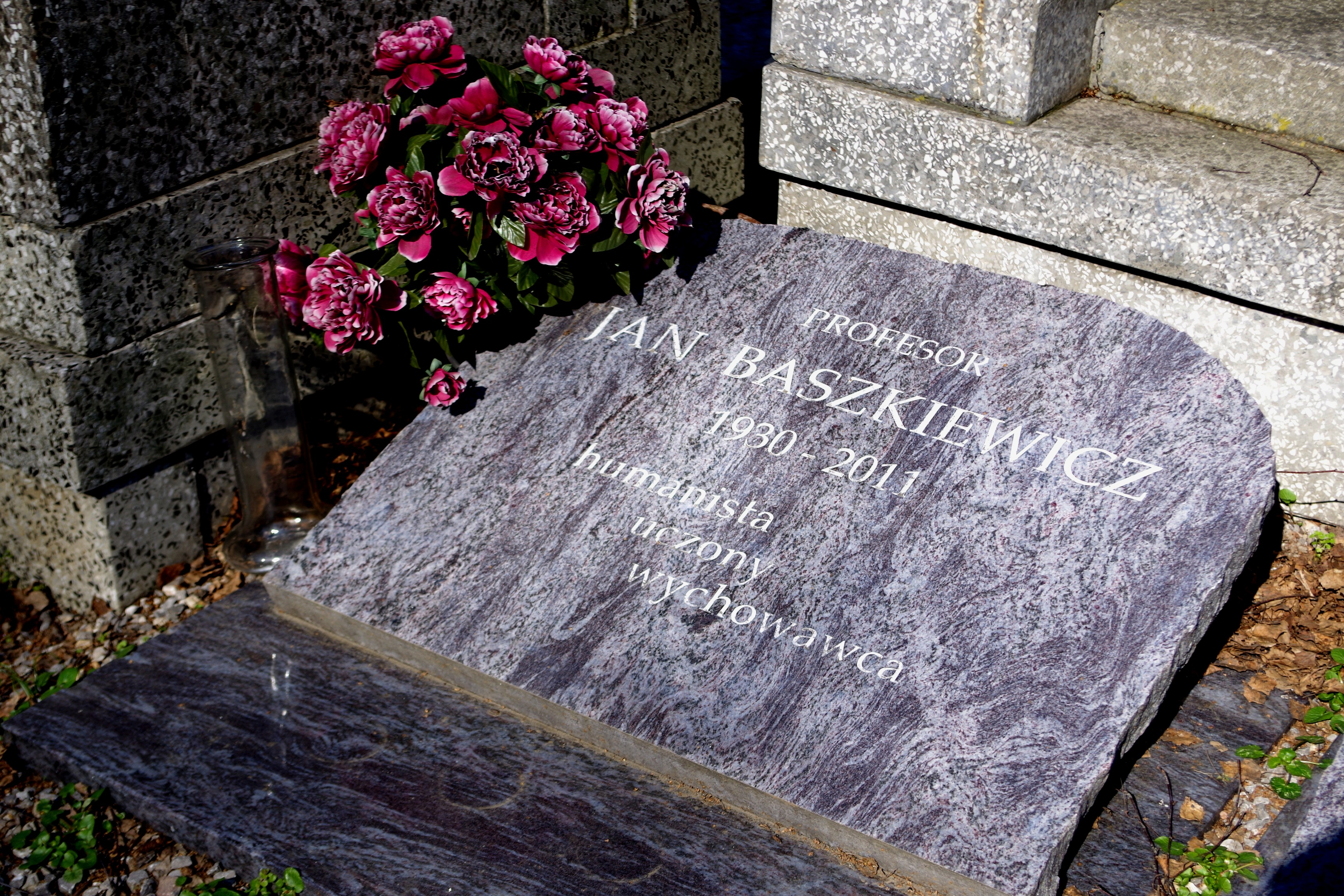
Grave of Jan Baszkiewicz at the Evangelical Reformed Cemetery, Warsaw

Jan Michał Baszkiewicz (3 January 1930 – 27 January 2011) was a lawyer, historian, politologist, historian of ideas, member of the Polish Academy of Sciences.

== Biography ==
He came from an intelligentsia family; he was the son of Bolesław Ludwik Baszkiewicz, a white-collar worker at the Municipal Transport Company in Warsaw, and Michalina née Perzanowska. He graduated from the Władysław IV High School in Warsaw. In the years 1946–1950 he studied law at the University of Warsaw. Until 1948 he was an activist of the Związek Niezależnej Młodzieży Socjalistycznej, in which he was member of the main committee and vice-chairman of the Warsaw committee; while his supervisor was Andrzej Munk.

From October 1949 he was a deputy assistant at the Department of General History of State and Law at the University of Warsaw. In the years 1951–1953 he served as a postgraduate student at the Department of History of State and Law at the University of Warsaw, headed by Juliusz Bardach, in whose scientific seminar he also participated. In 1954 he wrote his doctoral thesis, Powstanie zjednoczonego państwa polskiego na przełomie XIII i XIV wieku, under the supervision of Juliusz Bardach. In 1959, he was transferred to the University of Wrocław, where he became head of the Department of the History of Political and Legal Doctrines at the Faculty of Law. He was a historical consultant on the film Danton.

He authored several hundred works, including about 30 books. In 1986 he became a corresponding member of the Polish Academy of Sciences, and in 1994 – a full member of the Polish Academy of Sciences. He was a full member of the Warsaw Scientific Society and a member of Accademia dei Lincei. He supervised twenty six doctoral dissertations. His doctoral students included Adam Wielomski, Adam Lityński, Józef Ciągwa, Leszek Jesień, Tomasz Żyro, Monika Milewska and Bartłomiej Zdaniuk. In the years 1951–1990 he was a member of the Polish United Workers' Party. He was a member of Rada Konsultacyjna przy Przewodniczącym Rady Państwa and Centralna Komisja do Spraw Stopni i Tytułów.

He was buried at the Evangelical Reformed Cemetery in Warsaw.

== Works ==
- Powstanie zjednoczonego państwa polskiego na przełomie XIII i XIV wieku. 1954.
- Młodość uniwersytetu. 1963.
- Powszechna historia państwa i prawa. V. 1, Starożytność i wieki średnie. 1964.
- Państwo suwerenne w feudalnej doktrynie politycznej do początków XIV w. 1964.
- Powszechna historia państwa i prawa. V. 2, Czasy nowożytne 1500–1800. 1965.
- Polska czasów Łokietka. 1968.
- Historia doktryn politycznych i prawnych. 1970. Further editions: 1971, 1973, 1984. Co-authored with Franciszek Ryszka.
- Myśl polityczna wieków średnich. 1970. 1998, 2009.
- Historia Francji. 1974. 1978, 1995, 1999, 2004, 2008.
- Maksymilian Robespierre. 1976. 1989.
- Danton. 1978. 1980, 1990.
- Wolność, Równość, Własność: rewolucje burżuazyjne. 1981.
- Rewolucja francuska 1789–1794: społeczeństwo obywatelskie. 1983. Co-authored with Stefan Meller.
- Ludwik XVI. 1983. 1985.
- Richelieu. 1984. 1995.
- Francuzi 1789–1794: studium świadomości rewolucyjnej. 1989.
- Nowy człowiek, nowy naród, nowy świat: mitologia i rzeczywistość rewolucji francuskiej. 1993.
- Henryk IV Wielki. 1995.
- Francja. Historia państw świata w XX wieku. 1997.
- Młodość uniwersytetów (PDF). 1997. Archived from the original (PDF) on 20 May 2026.
- Powszechna historia ustrojów państwowych. 1998. 2002.
- Władza. 1999. 2009.
- Francja nowożytna: szkice z historii wieków XVII–XX. 2002.
- Anatomia bonapartyzmu. 2003.
- O niektórych filozoficznych i praktycznych dylematach praw człowieka. 2003.
- Francja w Europie. 2006.
- Odnowienie Królestwa Polskiego 1295–1320. 2008.
- Państwo, rewolucja, kultura polityczna. 2009.

== Accolades ==
- Knight of the Legion of Honour “as a distinguished ambassador of Polish culture in France and a devoted advocate of Polish-French scientific cooperation” (1996)
- Commander's Cross with Star of the Order of Polonia Restituta “in recognition of outstanding merits in scientific and teaching activities, for achievements in professional work” (2 August 2002)
- Honorary degree of the University of Wrocław (2003)
- Honorary degree of the Pedagogical Academy in Kraków (2005)
- Honorary degree of the Maria Curie-Skłodowska University (2008)
- Honorary degree of the Jagiellonian University (2008)
