= Eugene Bardach =

American public policy scholar

- Born: March 20, 1940
- Died: April 24, 2026 (aged 86)

Academic background
- Education: Columbia University (BA); University of California, Berkeley (PhD)

Academic work
- Discipline: Public policy
- Institutions: University of California, Berkeley
- Notable works: A Practical Guide for Policy Analysis
- Notable ideas: Eighfold path in public policy analysis

Eugene Bardach was an American political scientist. He was an emeritus professor at the Goldman School of Public Policy at the University of California, Berkeley. He is known for developing the eightfold path framework of policy analysis that is commonly used in public policy and public administration scholarship.

== Biography ==
Bardach received his B.A. from Columbia University in 1961 and PhD from the University of California, Berkeley in 1969. He began teaching at Berkeley after receiving his PhD, and took a short leave of absence to work for the Office of Policy Analysis at the United States Department of the Interior. His scholarship was focused on policy implementation and public management as well as how to improve interorganizational collaboration in service delivery. He served as acting dean of the Goldman School of Public Policy in 1997 and in 1987–1988.

Bardach authored A Practical Guide for Policy Analysis, a widely used textbook in public policy programs that is based on his experience teaching the principles of policy analysis and then helping students execute their projects. The book was known for introducing a concrete plan of action to students and scholars wishing to perform a public policy analysis.

Bardach was elected to the American Academy of Arts and Sciences in 2017.

Bardach died on April 24, 2026.
