= Man Is Wolf to Man =

Book by Janusz Bardach

- Author: Janusz Bardach, Kathleen Gleeson
- Publisher: University of California Press
- Publication date: 1998
- ISBN: 9780520213524

Man Is Wolf to Man: Surviving the Gulag (1998; ISBN 9780520221529) from the Latin Homo homini lupus is a memoir by Janusz Bardach, primarily surrounding the years during World War II. It was co-written with Kathleen Gleeson. The book tells the story of Bardach's transformation from placid student in pre-war Poland, to a Communist convert after the Soviet Union's bisecting of the country with Germany, and then follows him through his trial for treason and sentence of forced labor in the camps in the Kolyma region of Siberia. Throughout, Bardach's accounts show the sacrifice, toil, and luck necessary to survive in a Stalinist-era labor camp.

== Prologue ==
The memoir opens in Poland in July 1941, during Operation Barbarossa, the Nazi invasion of the Soviet Union. Bardach, a member of a tank crew, is digging his own grave in anticipation of his execution for treason. During the war, treason was an all-encompassing offense that could be applied to a litany of offenses, ranging from something as small as dereliction of duty. In Bardach's case, he was charged with treason for the belief that he intentionally wrecked his tank, when in fact it was simply rendered inoperable while fording a river.

Bound and thrust into his self-made grave, Bardach waits for the impending shot, all the while wondering how it was that he had come to this place. "The night and earth and sleep and death had merged. All felt the same."

== Reviews ==
In so far as Man Is Wolf to Man is the story of man's brutality to man, popular criticism tended to compare it favorably to similar historical works, most notably Aleksandr Solzhenitsyn's Gulag Archipelago, while at the same time pointing toward its ultimately uplifting tale, not only of man's ability to survive, but also to assist others when seemingly at their worst. Perhaps most damning is Bardach's transformation from earnest Communist sympathizer to witness to its greatest atrocities. Paul Goldberg said in the New York Times, "Man Is Wolf to Man presents an eloquent account of Bardach's transition from naivete to wisdom."
