= Juliusz Bardach =

Polish legal historian (1914–2010)

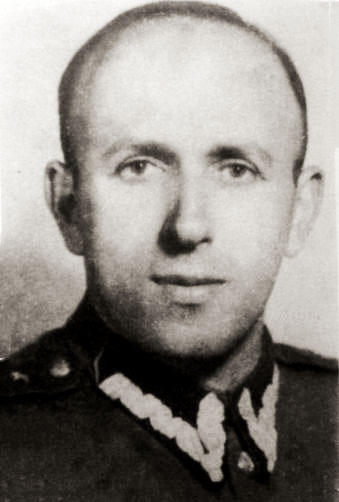
- Juliusz Bardach
- Born: 3 November 1914
- Died: 26 January 2010 (aged 95)
- Citizenship: Polish
- Education: Vilnius University
- Occupation: legal historian

Juliusz Bardach (3 November 1914, in Odessa – 26 January 2010, in Warsaw) was a Polish legal historian. Professor of the University of Warsaw, member of the Polish Academy of Sciences. He specialized in the history of governance and law of Lithuania and Poland.

Military attaché in Moscow (1945–1947). He received his Ph.D. from the Jagiellonian University in 1948 upon dissertation supervised by Adam Vetulani. He received Doctor honoris causa from the University of Łódź (1995), University of Warsaw (1996) and the University of Vilnius (1997). Bardach was a recipient of the Grand Cross of the Order of Polonia Restituta (2002) and the Officer's Cross of the Lithuanian Order of Merit (2006).

He was the older brother of surgeon and Gulag survivor Janusz Bardach, author of Man Is Wolf to Man.

Jan Baszkiewicz was among his doctoral students.

== Selected works ==
- Historia państwa i prawa Polski do połowy XV wieku (1957)
- Historia państwa i prawa polskiego (1976, with Bogusław Leśnodorski and Michał Pietrzak, ISBN 83-01-00104-6)
- Themis a Clio czyli Prawo a historia (2001, ISBN 8372060363)
- Dzieje Sejmu Polskiego (1993, ISBN 83-7059-044-6)
- O dawnej i niedawnej Litwie (1988, ISBN 83-232-0118-8)
- Historia ustroju i prawa polskiego (1993, ISBN 83-01-11026-0)
- O Rzeczpospolitą Obojga Narodów (1998, ISBN 83-03-03692-0)
- Statuty litewskie a prawo rzymskie (1999, ISBN 83-912525-0-7)
- W obiektywie nauki i w lustrze pamięci (o uczonych, pisarzach i politykach XIX i XX wieku) (2004, ISBN 83-7387-541-7)

== Sources ==
- (in Polish) "Juliusz Bardach". Information Processing Centre database (in Polish).
