= Eightfold path (policy analysis) =

Method of policy analysis

The eightfold path is a method of policy analysis assembled by Eugene Bardach, a professor at the Goldman School of Public Policy at the University of California, Berkeley. It is outlined in his book A Practical Guide for Policy Analysis: The Eightfold Path to More Effective Problem Solving, which is now in its seventh edition. The book is commonly referenced in public policy and public administration scholarship.

Bardach's procedure is as follows:

1. Define the problem
2. Assemble the evidence
3. Construct the alternatives
4. Select the criteria
5. Project the outcomes
6. Confront the trade-offs
7. Decide
8. Tell your story

A possible ninth step, based on Bardach's own writing, might be "repeat steps 1–8 as necessary."

The method is named after the Buddhist Noble Eightfold Path, but otherwise has no relation to it.

== New York taxi driver test ==
The New York taxi driver test is a technique for evaluating the effectiveness of communication between policy makers and analysts. Bardach contends that policy explanations must be clear and down-to-earth enough for a taxi driver to be able to understand the premise during a trip through city streets. The New York taxi driver is presumed to be both a non-specialist and a tough customer.

== See also ==
- Policy analysis
