= Janusz Bardach =

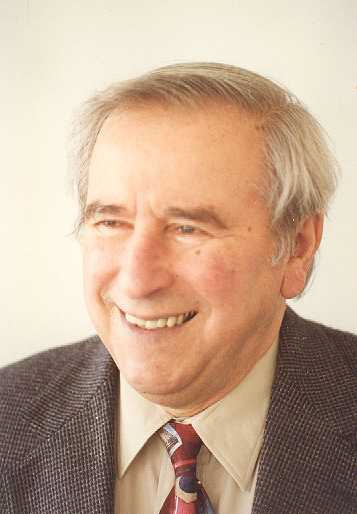
Janusz Bardach

Janusz Bardach (July 28, 1919 in Odessa – August 16, 2002 in Iowa City) was a gulag inmate, author, and noted plastic surgeon. He was the younger brother of Polish legal scholar Juliusz Bardach. Survivors include: his wife, Phyllis Harper- Bardach of Iowa City, Iowa; his daughter, Ewa Bardach and her husband Hani Elkadi of Iowa City; his granddaughter, Nina Elkadi of Iowa City.

== Early life ==
Janusz Bardach was born in Odessa to Polish Jews Ottylia and Mark Bardach. At the age of one, his father Mark moved the family back to Wlodzimierz-Wolynski, Poland (now Volodymyr-Volynskyi, Ukraine). Mark Bardach was a dentist, and his uncle, Jakov Julievich Bardach, was a doctor. Janusz grew up in Poland as a secular Jew and was a strong supporter of the Soviet Union. As a teenager, he suffered from anti-Semitic attacks and joined Jewish and left-wing groups.

== The war and the Gulag ==
When, during World War II Poland was partitioned between Germany and the Soviet Union, Bardach was drafted into the Red Army. He became a tank driver. Sarcastic political remarks in training and an accident during a scouting mission that resulted in an overturned tank caused him to be court-martialed for counter-revolutionary activity. He was condemned to execution, but the sentence was commuted to hard labor in the gulag.

While in the transit camps leading to the gold mines, Bardach experienced anti-Semitism from fellow Polish inmates. In order to escape the Polish sector he faked stomach cramps and went to the camp doctor. The doctor was impressed that Bardach already knew the diagnosis and treatment from his feigned symptoms, and asked Bardach if he was a medical student. Bardach lied and claimed to be one, drawing on medical knowledge gleaned from his father, and was made a feldsher, or doctor's assistant, in the camps.

Later, Bardach was sent to the infamous gold mines at Kolyma. While being transferred, his truck's furnace exploded, killing the driver, guards, and many prisoners. Using this incident and his previous record as a doctor's assistant, Bardach talked his way into working in the camp hospitals, where he continued to pretend to be a medical student. After the war, Bardach's sentence was commuted, and he moved to Moscow to attend medical school.

== Medical career ==
In 1950 Bardach graduated from the Moscow Medical Stomatologogical Institute, and completed his residency there as well in 1954, specializing in reconstructive maxillofacial surgery. After residency and marriage, he returned to Poland, moving to Łódź, where he worked on procedures for cleft lips and palates. Eventually, he developed the procedure known as the Bardach palatoplasty.

Anti-Semitism and Communism drove him to escape Poland for the United States in 1972, when he joined the Department of Otolaryngology at the University of Iowa. In 1973 he became chairman of the Division of Plastic and Reconstructive Surgery of the Head and Neck. For many of these years he could not speak freely about his experiences during the war nor return to Poland, as both might cause the arrest of his family members remaining in Poland. After the fall of Communism he wrote his two memoirs, listed below.

== Selected works ==
- Bardach, Janusz; Gleeson, Kathleen (1999). Man Is Wolf to Man: Surviving the Gulag. University of California Press. ISBN 978-0-520-22152-9.
- Bardach, Janusz; Gleeson, Kathleen (2003). Surviving Freedom: After the Gulag. University of California Press. ISBN 978-0-520-23735-3.
