= Policy analysis =

Technique used in public administration

Policy analysis or public policy analysis is a technique used in the public administration sub-field of political science to enable civil servants, nonprofit organizations, and others to examine and evaluate the available options to implement the goals of laws and elected officials. People who regularly use policy analysis in their work, particularly those who use it as a major part of their job duties are generally known by the title policy analyst. The process is also used in the administration of large organizations with complex policies. It has been defined as the process of "determining which of various policies will achieve a given set of goals in light of the relations between the policies and the goals."

Policy analysis can be divided into two major fields:

- Analysis of existing policy, which is analytical and descriptive – it attempts to explain policies and their development
- Analysis for new policy, which is prescriptive – it is involved with formulating policies and proposals (for example: to improve social welfare)

One definition states that:

Policy Analysis is the process of identifying potential policy options that could address your problem and then comparing those options to choose the most effective, efficient, and feasible one.

Another definition considers policy analysis as a method employed in the administration of the state to empower civil servants, activists, etc. for identifying, analyzing and scrutinizing the available alternatives to execute the agenda of laws and elected officials. This makes policy analysis both a process for public and the private sector.

The purpose and area of interest determine the type of analysis conducted. A combination of two kinds of policy analyses together with program evaluation is defined as policy studies. Policy analysis is frequently deployed in the public sector, but is equally applicable elsewhere, such as nonprofit organizations and non-governmental organizations. Policy analysis has its roots in systems analysis, an approach used by United States Secretary of Defense Robert McNamara in the 1960s.

== Approaches ==
Various approaches to policy analysis exist. The analysis for policy (and analysis of policy) is the central approach in social science and educational policy studies. It is linked to two different traditions of policy analysis and research frameworks. The approach of analysis for policy refers to research conducted for actual policy development, often commissioned by policymakers inside the bureaucracy (e.g. civil servants) within which the policy is developed. Analysis of policy is more of an academic exercise, conducted by academic researchers, professors and think tank researchers, who are often seeking to understand why a particular policy was developed at a particular time and assess the effects, intended or otherwise, of that policy when it was implemented.

There are three approaches that can be distinguished: the analysis-centric, the policy process, and the meta-policy approach.

=== Analysis-centric ===
The analysis-centric (or "analycentric") approach focuses on individual problems and their solutions. Its scope is the micro-scale and its problem interpretation or problem resolution usually involves a technical solution. The primary aim is to identify the most effective and efficient solution in technical and economic terms (e.g. the most efficient allocation of resources).

=== Policy process ===
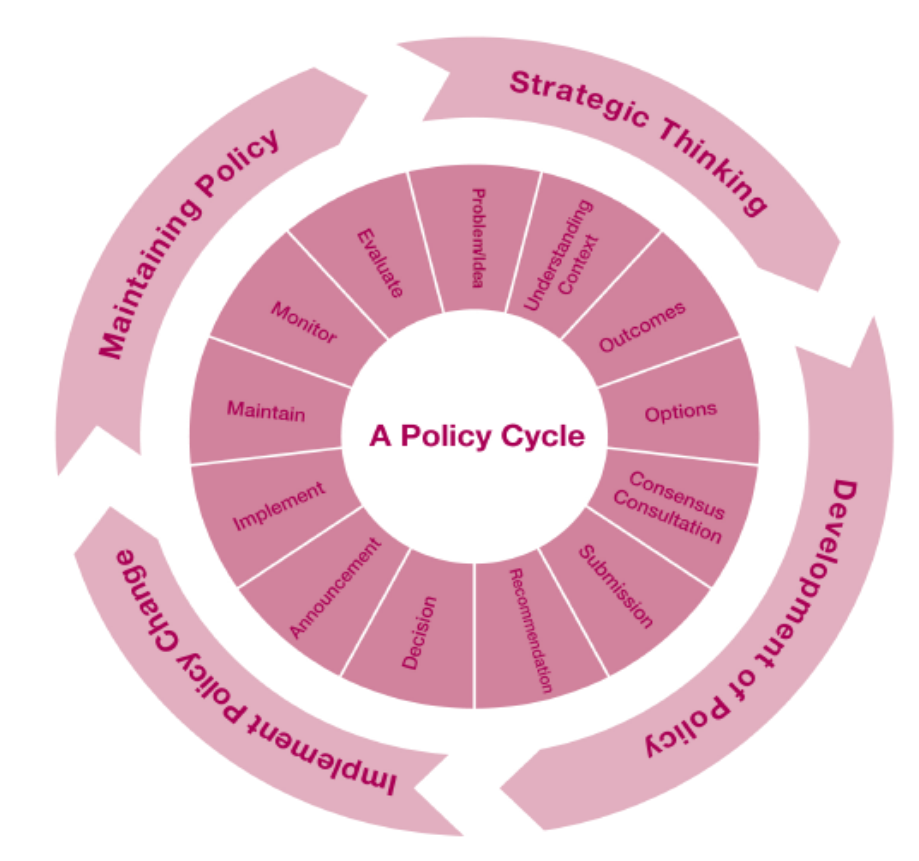
Example of a policy cycle, used in the PROCSEE Approach

The policy process approach puts its focal point onto political processes and involved stakeholders; its scope is the broader meso-scale and it interprets problems using a political lens (i.e., the interests and goals of elected officials). It aims at determining what processes, means and policy instruments (e.g., regulation, legislation, subsidy) are used. As well, it tries to explain the role and influence of stakeholders within the policy process. Stakeholders are broadly defined to include citizens, community groups, non-governmental organizations, businesses and even opposing political parties. By changing the relative power and influence of certain groups (e.g., enhancing public participation and consultation), solutions to problems may be identified that have more "buy in" from a wider group. One way of doing this follows a heuristic model called the policy cycle. In its simplest form, the policy cycle, which is often depicted visually as a loop or circle, starts with the identification of the problem, proceeds to an examination of the different policy tools that could be used to respond to that problem, then goes on to the implementation stage, in which one or more policies are put into practice (e.g., a new regulation or subsidy is set in place), and then finally, once the policy has been implemented and run for a certain period, the policy is evaluated. A number of different viewpoints can be used during evaluation, including looking at a policy's effectiveness, cost-effectiveness, value for money, outcomes or outputs.

=== Meta-policy ===
The meta-policy approach is a systems and context approach; i.e., its scope is the macro-scale and its problem interpretation is usually of a structural nature. It aims at explaining the contextual factors of the policy process; i.e., what the political, economic and socio-cultural factors are that influence it. As problems may result because of structural factors (e.g., a certain economic system or political institution), solutions may entail changing the structure itself.

== Methodology ==
Policy analysis uses both qualitative methods and quantitative methods. Qualitative research includes case studies and interviews with community members. Quantitative research includes survey research, statistical analysis (also called data analysis) and model building. A common practice is to define the problem and evaluation criteria; identify and evaluate alternatives; and recommend a certain policy accordingly. Promotion of the best agendas are the product of careful "back-room" analysis of policies by a priori assessment and 'a posteriori evaluation.

Several methods used in policy analysis are:

- Cost–benefit analysis
- Management by objectives (MBO)
- Operations research
- Decision-making based on analytics
- Program evaluation and review technique (PERT)
- Critical path method (CPM).

=== Dimensions for analyzing policies ===
There are six dimensions to policy analysis categorized as the effects and implementation of the policy across a period of time. Also collectively known as "Durability" of the policy, which means the capacity in content of the policy to produce visible

Effects

Effectiveness	What effects does the policy have on the targeted problem?
Unintended effects	What are the unintended effects of this policy?
Equity	What are the effects of this policy on different population groups?

Implementation

Cost	What is the financial cost of this policy?
Feasibility	Is the policy technically feasible?
Acceptability	Do the relevant policy stakeholders view the policy as acceptable?

The strategic effects dimensions can pose certain limitations due to data collection. However the analytical dimensions of effects directly influences acceptability. The degree of acceptability is based upon the plausible definitions of actors involved in feasibility. If the feasibility dimension is compromised, it will put the implementation at risk, which will entail additional costs. Finally, implementation dimensions collectively influence a policy's ability to produce results or impacts.

=== Five-E approach ===
One model of policy analysis is the "five-E approach", which consists of examining a policy in terms of:

Effectiveness
How well does it work (or how well will it be predicted to work)?
Efficiency
How much work does or will it entail? Are there significant costs associated with this solution, and are they worth it?
Ethical considerations
Is it ethically and morally sound? Are there unintended consequences?
Evaluations of alternatives
How good is it compared to other approaches? Have all the relevant other approaches been considered?
Establishment of recommendations for positive change
What can actually be implemented? Is it better to amend, replace, remove, or add a policy?

=== Framework ===
Policies are often viewed as frameworks intended to optimize general well-being and are commonly analyzed by legislative bodies and lobbyists. Every policy analysis is intended to bring an evaluative outcome. A systemic policy analysis is meant for in depth study for addressing a social problem. Following are steps in a policy analysis:

1. Defining the problem assessed by the policy.
2. Assessing policy objectives and its target populations.
3. Studying effects of the policy.
4. Policy implications: distribution of resources, changes in services rights and statuses, tangible benefits.
5. Alternative policies: surveying existing and possible policy models that could have addressed the problem better or parts of it which could make it effective.

== Evidence-based models ==
Many models exist to analyze the development and implementation of public policy. Analysts use these models to identify important aspects of policy, as well as explain and predict policy and its consequences. Each of these models are based upon the types of policies.

=== Types ===
- Government (e.g. federal, provincial, municipal)
- Policies adopted within public institutions (e.g. hospitals, child care centers, schools)
- Workplace (e.g. policies that govern employees and employee-manager relations)

=== Governments ===
Public policy is determined by a range of political institutions, which give policy legitimacy to policy measures. In general, the government applies policy to all citizens and monopolizes the use of force in applying or implementing policy (through government control of law enforcement, court systems, imprisonment and armed forces). The legislature, executive and judicial branches of government are examples of institutions that give policy legitimacy. Many countries also have independent, quasi-independent or arm's length bodies which, while funded by government, are independent from elected officials and political leaders. These organizations may include government commissions, tribunals, regulatory agencies and electoral commissions.

==== Process model ====
Policy creation is a process that typically follows a sequence of steps or stages:

- Identification of a problem (also called "problem definition") and demand for government action. Different stakeholders may define the same issue as different problems. For example, if homeless people are using illegal drugs such as heroin in a city park, some stakeholders may define this as a law enforcement issue (which, in their view, could be best solved if police presence in the park is stepped up and if the individuals using illegal drugs are arrested and punished); on the other hand, other stakeholders may view this as a poverty and public health issue (which, in their view, could be best solved if public health nurses and government medical doctors and substance abuse counsellors were sent to the park to do outreach with the drug-using individuals, and encourage them to voluntarily enter "detoxification" or rehabilitation programs).
- Agenda setting
- Formulation of policy proposals by various parties (e.g., citizen groups, congressional committees, think tanks, interest groups, lobby groups, non-governmental organizations).
- Policy selection/adoption and legal enactment of a selected policy by elected officials and/or houses of representatives. At this stage, policy legitimation is conferred upon the selected policy solution(s).
- Policy implementation, which involves civil servants putting the selected policy option into practice. Depending on the choice made by the executive or legislative branch, this could involve creating new regulation (or removing existing regulations), creating new laws, creating a new government program or service, creating a new subsidy or grant, etc.
- Policy evaluation. After the policy has been in place for a year or several years, civil servants or an independent consulting firm assesses the policy, to see if the goals were achieved, if the policy was implemented effectively, etc.

This model, however, has been criticized for being overly linear and simplistic. In reality, stages of the policy process may overlap or never happen. Also, this model fails to take into account the multiple factors attempting to influence the process itself as well as each other, and the complexity this entails.

=== For public institutions ===
One of the most widely used model for public institutions is one developed by Herbert A. Simon, the "father of rational models"; It is also used by private corporations. However, many criticise the model due to some of its characteristics being impractical and relying on unrealistic assumptions. For instance, it is a difficult model to apply in the public sector because social problems can be very complex, ill-defined, and inter-dependent. The problem lies in the thinking procedure implied by the model which is linear and can face difficulties in extraordinary problems or social problems which have no sequences of happenings.

==== Rational planning model ====
The rational planning model of decision-making is a process for making sound decisions in policy-making in the public sector. Rationality is defined as “a style of behavior that is appropriate to the achievement of given goals, within the limits imposed by given conditions and constraints”. The model makes a series of assumptions, such as: "The model must be applied in a system that is stable"; "The government is a rational and unitary actor and that its actions are perceived as rational choices"; "The policy problem is unambiguous"; "There are no limitations of time or cost".

In the context of the public sector, policy models are intended to achieve maximum social gain, and may involve the following steps to achieve rational decisions:

1. Intelligence gathering — A comprehensive organization of data; potential problems and opportunities are identified, collected and analyzed.
2. Identifying problems — Accounting for relevant factors.
3. Assessing the consequences of all options — Listing possible consequences and alternatives that could resolve the problem and ranking the probability that each potential factor could materialize in order to give a correct priority to said factor in the analysis.
4. Relating consequences to values — With all policies there will be a set of relevant dimensional values (for example, economic feasibility and environmental protection) and a set of criteria for appropriateness, against which performance (or consequences) of each option being responsive can be judged.
5. Choosing the preferred option — The policy is brought through from fully understanding the problems, opportunities, all the consequences & the criteria of the tentative options and by selecting an optimal alternative with consensus of involved actors.

The Rational planning model has also proven to be very useful to several decision making processes in industries outside the public sphere. Nonetheless, there are some who criticize the rational model due to the major problems which can be faced & which tend to arise in practice because social and environmental values can be difficult to quantify and forge consensus around. Furthermore, the assumptions stated by Simon are never fully valid in a real-world context.

Further criticism of the rational model include: leaving a gap between planning and implementation, ignoring of the role of people, entrepreneurs, leadership, etc., the insufficiency of technical competence (i.e. ignoring the human factor), reflecting too mechanical an approach (i.e. the organic nature of organizations), requiring of multidimensional and complex models, generation of predictions which are often wrong (i.e. simple solutions may be overlooked), and incurring of cost (i.e. costs of rational-comprehensive planning may outweigh the cost savings of the policy).

However, Thomas R. Dye, the president of the Lincoln Center for Public Service, states the rational model provides a good perspective since in modern society rationality plays a central role and everything that is rational tends to be prized. Thus, it does not seem strange that "we ought to be trying for rational decision-making".

==== Incremental policy ====
An incremental policy model relies on features of incremental decision-making such as: satisficing, organizational drift, bounded rationality, and limited cognition, among others. Such policies are often called "muddling through" and represent a conservative tendency: new policies are only slightly different from old policies. Policy-makers are too short on time and other resources to make totally new policies; thus, past policies are accepted as having some legitimacy. When existing policies have sunk costs which discourage innovation, incrementalism is an easier approach than rationalism, and the policies are more politically expedient because they do not necessitate any radical redistribution of values. Such models often struggle to improve the acceptability of public policy.

Criticisms of such a policy approach include: challenges to bargaining (i.e. not successful with limited resources), downplaying useful quantitative information, obscuring real relationships between political entities, an anti-intellectual approach to problems (i.e. the preclusion of imagination), and a bias towards conservatism (i.e. bias against far-reaching solutions).

=== For workplaces ===
There are many contemporary policies relevant to gender and workplace issues. Actors analyze contemporary gender-related employment issues ranging from parental leave and maternity programs, sexual harassment, and work/life balance to gender mainstreaming. It is by the juxtaposition of a variety of research methodologies focused on a common theme the richness of understanding is gained. This integrates what are usually separate bodies of evaluation on the role of gender in welfare state developments, employment transformations, workplace policies, and work experience.

=== Other ===
There are several other major types of policy analysis, broadly groupable into competing approaches:

- Empirical versus normative policy analyses
- Retrospective versus prospective analyses
- Prescriptive versus descriptive analyses.

== Evaluation ==
The success of a policy can be measured by changes in the behavior of the target population and active support from various actors and institutions involved. A public policy is an authoritative communication prescribing an unambiguous course of action for specified individuals or groups in certain situations. There must be an authority or leader charged with the implementation and monitoring of the policy with a sound social theory underlying the program and the target group. Evaluations can help estimate what effects will be produced by program objectives/alternatives. However, claims of causality can only be made with randomized control trials in which the policy change is applied to one group and not applied to a control group and individuals are randomly assigned to these groups.

To obtain compliance of the actors involved, the government can resort to positive sanctions, such as favorable publicity, price supports, tax credits, grants-in-aid, direct services or benefits; declarations; rewards; voluntary standards; mediation; education; demonstration programs; training, contracts; subsidies; loans; general expenditures; informal procedures, bargaining; franchises; sole-source provider awards...etc.

=== Steps for conducting a policy evaluation ===
Policy evaluation is used to examine content, implementation or impact of the policy, which helps to understand the merit, worth and the utility of the policy. Following are National Collaborating Centre for Healthy Public Policy's (NCCHPP) 10 steps:

Planning

- Clarify the policy
- Engage stakeholders
- Assess resources and evaluability
- Determine your evaluation questions
- Determine methods and procedures
- Develop evaluation plan

Implementation

- Collect data
- Process data and analyze results

Utilization

- Interpret and disseminate the results
- Apply evaluation findings

Details of such a plan may vary by institution and context. For example, a Public Health Ontario revision of the above replaces the first three steps with "describe the program", "identify and engage partners", and "determine timelines and available resources", while otherwise retaining the model.

=== Rapid evaluation and assessment methods ===
There is sometimes a need for policy assessment to be conducted at speed, using rapid evaluation and assessment methods (REAM).

Characteristics of REAM include setting clear and targeted objectives at the start of a policy cycle, participation and interdisciplinary teamwork, simultaneous collection and analysis of data, and the staged reporting of findings. These require front-loaded effort: consulting with funders and achieving buy-in from informants who will face competing demands during implementation phases. They also blur the distinction between evaluation and implementation, as interim findings are used to adapt and improve processes.

Rapid methods can be used when there is a short policy cycle. For instance, they are often used in international development to assess the impact of aid policies in response to natural disasters. It has been suggested that rapid assessment methods may be necessary to evaluate energy and climate policies in the context of the climate emergency.

=== Value to policymakers ===
Policy analysis influences policymakers by introducing new ideas and frameworks, through the work of policy analysts summarizing ideas and frameworks found in the relevant literature.

Policymakers tend to value policy analysis more depending on the cause of a policy problem. Evidence of a purposeful cause for a problem can compel policy decisions more than unguided causes.

== See also ==
- Advocacy evaluation
- Discourse analysis
- Discursive institutionalism
- Eightfold path (policy analysis)
- New public management
- Political feasibility analysis
- Propensity score matching
