= Lytovezh, Volyn Oblast =

Lytovezh Литовеж
- Settlement
- Lytovezh
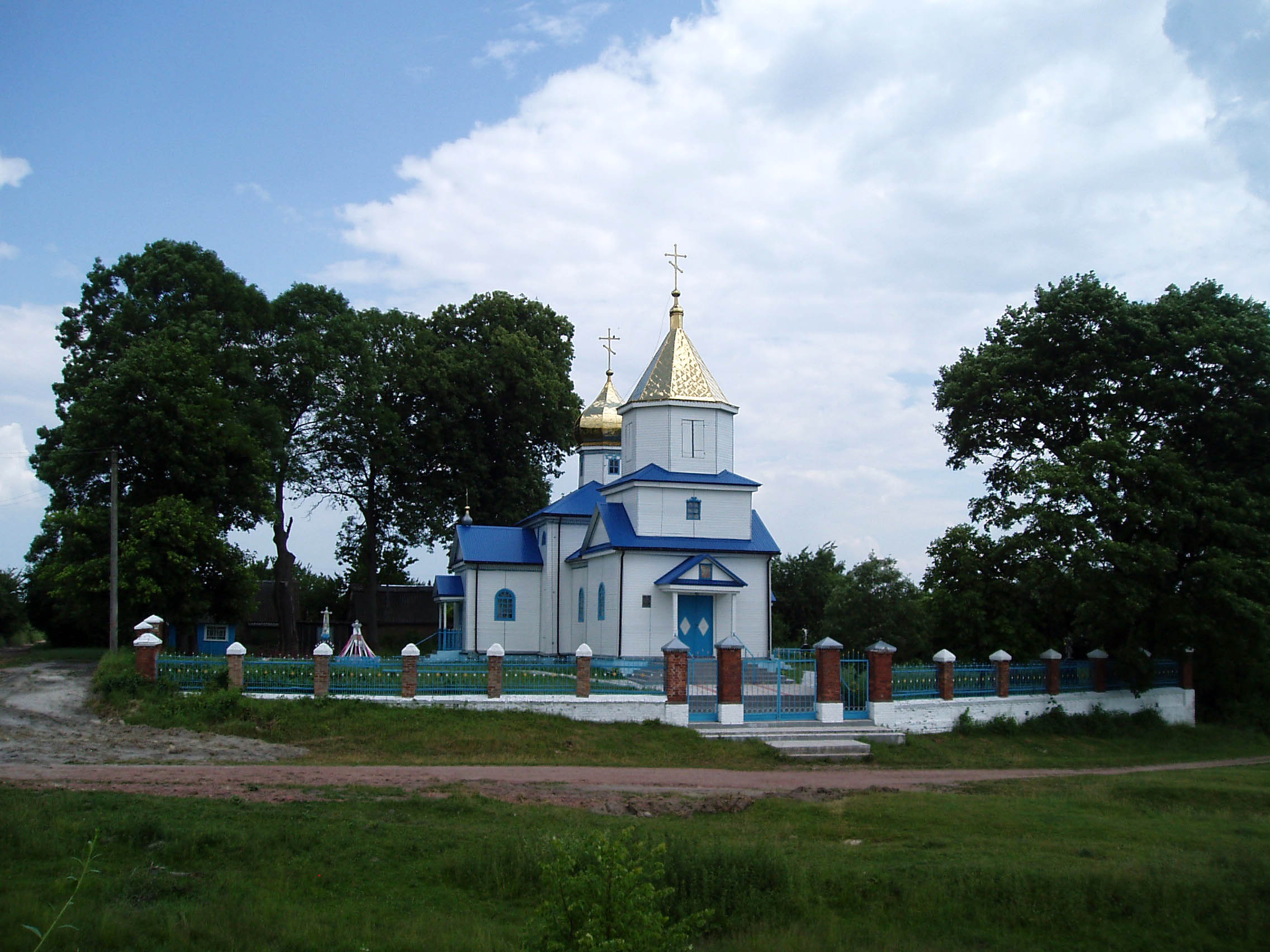
- A church from 1791

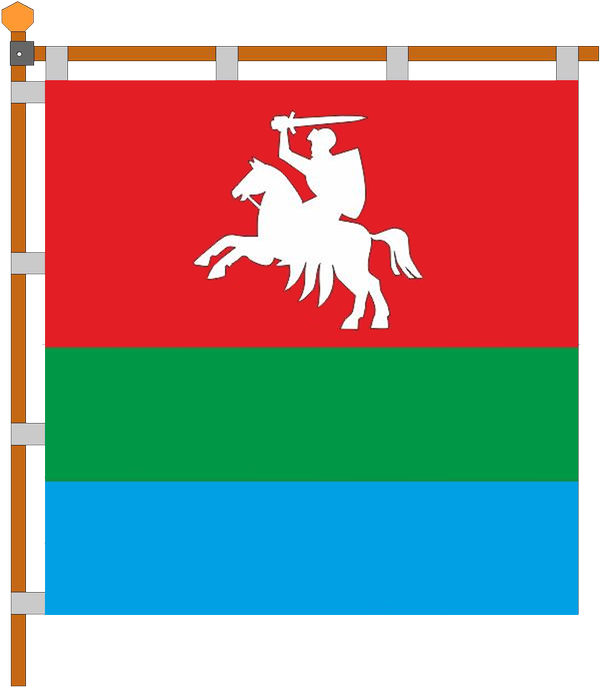
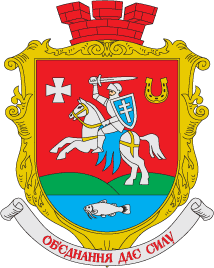
- Flag Coat of arms

- Location of Lytovezh within Ukraine Lytovezh (Ukraine)
- Coordinates: 50°39′5″N 24°11′17″E
- Country: Ukraine
- Oblast: Volyn Oblast
- Raion: Volodymyr Raion
- Hromada: Lytovezh rural hromada
- Based: Sometime during the 15th century

Government
  - Village Head: Ivanchuk Ivan Ivanovych

Area
  - Total: 4.267 km^{2} (1.647 sq mi)
- Elevation: 187 m (614 ft)

Population
  - Total: 1,507
  - Density: 353.2/km^{2} (915/sq mi)
- Zip: 45325
- Area code: +380 3372

Lytovezh (Ukrainian: Литовеж) is a village in the Volodymyr Raion of the Volyn Oblast in Ukraine. The population is 1507 people. It is the centre of the Lytovezh rural hromada.

== Geography ==
After the de-establishment and dissolution of Ivanychiv Raion on July 19, 2020, the village became part of Volodymyr Raion. The elevation in meters is 187 meters above sea level. The village is located on the oriental bank of the Bug River, also near itsborder with the Lviv Oblast. The settlement is located 5 km from Blahodatne, 12 km from Ivanychi and 10 km from Novovolynsk.

== History ==
In the XIV century. Lithuanian princes built a castle with powerful earthen fortifications and watchtowers. The first mention of the Lytovezh in historical documents is from the fifteenth century. In 1501, the granted Magdeburg rights were confirmed by the Polish king Sigismund I the Old.

In 1906 the village of Hrybovytsky volost of Volodymyr-Volyn raion of Volhynia governorate. The distance from the county town is 27 versts, from the parish 7. Yards 285, inhabitants 1710.

Near the village there are the ancient remnants of what remains of the former villages and forts of: doba eneolita (4-3 millennium BC) and rannaya zaliza (late 2 thousand - early 1 thousand BC).

== Population ==
According to the 1989 Ukrainian SSR census, the population of the village was 1607, of which 724 were men and 883 were women.

According to the 2001 Ukrainian census, the village had a population of 1506 people.

== Language ==
Distribution of the population by mother tongue according to the 2001 census:

Language	Percentage (%)
Ukrainian	99%
Russian	0.66%
Belarusian	0.27%
