= Ustyluh urban hromada =

Ustyluh urban hromada Устилузька міська громада
- Hromada
- Interactive map of Ustyluh urban hromada
- Country: Ukraine
- Oblast: Volyn
- Raion: Volodymyr
- Admin. center: Ustyluh

Area
  - Total: 413.7 km^{2} (159.7 sq mi)

Population (2018)
  - Total: 7,551
  - Density: 18.25/km^{2} (47.27/sq mi)
- CATOTTG code: UA07020210000033081
- Settlements: 26
- Cities: 1
- Villages: 25
- Website: ustyluzka-gromada.gov.ua

Ustyluh urban territorial hromada (Ukrainian: Устилузька міська територіальна громада) is one of the hromadas of Ukraine, located in Volodymyr Raion in Volyn Oblast. Its administrative centre is the city of Ustyluh.

The hromada has an area of 413.7 km^{2} (159.7 mi^{2}), as well as a population of 7,551 (as of 2018).

Formed on August 14, 2015 by merging the Ustyluh City Council and the Khotiachiv, Ludyn, Mykytychi, Piatydni, Rohozhany, Stenzharychi, Zoria village councils of the Volodymyr-Volynskyi Raion. Formed (approved) by the order of the Cabinet of Ministers of Ukraine dated June 12, 2020 No. 708-r in the same composition.

On July 19, 2020, as a result of the administrative-territorial reform and liquidation of the Volodymyr-Volynskyi Raion (1940–2020), the hromada joined the newly formed Volodymyr-Volynskyi Raion (from July 18, 2022 — Volodymyr).

== Composition ==
In addition to one city (Ustyluh), the hromada contains 25 villages:

- Ambukiv
- Chornykiv
- Darnytske
- Izov
- Khotiachiv
- Khrypalychi
- Kladniv
- Korytnytsia
- Ludyn
- Mykytychi
- Novyny
- Piatydni
- Polumiane
- Rohozhany
- Rokytnytsia
- Rusiv
- Selisky
- Stenzharychi
- Trostianka
- Turivka
- Vorchyn
- Vydranka
- Zabolottia
- Zaluzhzhia
- Zoria

== Starosta okruhs ==
- Khotiachiv
- Ludyn
- Mykytychi
- Piatydni
- Rohozhany
- Stenzharychi
- Zoria

== Geography ==
The rivers Bug, Luha, and Studianka flow through the territory of the community.

== Social sphere ==
As of 2015, the community maintained 19 paramedic and obstetrician stations, an outpatient clinic, a hospital, an ambulance station, 10 schools, 8 kindergartens, 3 extracurricular education institutions, and 21 cultural institutions.
