= Hrybovytsia =

Rural locality in Volyn Oblast, Ukraine

Hrybovytsia Грибовиця
- Location in Volyn Oblast
- Coordinates: 50°41′18″N 24°14′56″E
- Country: Ukraine
- Oblast: Volyn Oblast
- Raion: Volodymyr Raion
- Hromada: Novovolynsk urban hromada
- Time zone: UTC+2 (EET)
  - Summer (DST): UTC+3 (EEST)
- Postal code: 45324

Hrybovytsia (Ukrainian: Грибовиця) is a village in the Novovolynsk urban hromada of the Volodymyr Raion of Volyn Oblast in Ukraine.

== History ==
On 19 July 2020, as a result of the administrative-territorial reform and liquidation of the Ivanychi Raion, the village became part of the Volodymyr Raion.

== Notable residents ==
- Sviatoslav Verbych (born 1971), Ukrainian linguist

== Sources ==
- "Hrybowica". Geographical Dictionary of the Kingdom of Poland (in Polish). p. 159.
