= Sviatoslav Verbych =

Ukrainian linguist (born 1971)

- Святослав Олексійович Вербич
- Born: 5 September 1971 (age 54); Hrybovytsia, Volyn Oblast (now Ukraine)
- Education: Lutsk Pedagogical Institute

Sviatoslav Verbych (Ukrainian: Святослав Олексійович Вербич; born 5 September 1971) is a Ukrainian linguist.

== Biography ==
Sviatoslav Verbych was born on 5 September 1971, in Hrybovytsia, now the Novovolynsk urban hromada of Volodymyr Raion of the Volyn Oblast in Ukraine.

In 1994 he graduated from the Lutsk Pedagogical Institute.

In 1997 he started working at the NASU Institute of Ukrainian Language, where he was a senior researcher scientist from 2006, and in 2022 became a leading researcher scientist at the Department of History of the Ukrainian Language and Onomastics. In 1999–2001, he was also an associate professor at the Department of Ukrainian Studies at the National Defense Academy of Ukraine, and from 2002 to 2015 he was an docent at the Department of Foreign Philology and Translation at the Kyiv Institute of Translators.

From 2017, he has a PhD in philology. In 2018, he became the chairman of the Ukrainian Onomastic Commission.

== Works ==
His research interests include onomastics, the etymology of onomatopoeia and appellative vocabulary.

Author and compiler of books "Nevidoma Ukraina. Unikalni mistsia ta sporudy" (2020, author-compiler), "Skarby ta relikvii Ukrainy" (2020, author-compiler), and monographs "Dilova ukrainska mova" (2000, co-author), "Hidronimiia baseinu Verkhnoho Dnistra: Etymolohichnyi slovnyk-dovidnyk" (2007), "Hidronimiia baseinu Serednoho Dnistra: Etymolohichnyi slovnyk" (2009), "Spilkuisia ukrainskoiu. Praktychni porady z ukrainskoho movlennia: Navchalnyi posibnyk" (2011), "Hidronimiia baseinu Dnistra" (2017).
