= Ihor Lapin =

Ukrainian lawyer, politician, and military commander

- Ігор Лапін

Personal details
- Born: May 28, 1969 (age 57) Ivanychi, Volyn Oblast, Ukrainian SSR
- Education: University of Lviv
- Nickname: Zola

Military service
- Allegiance: Ukraine
- Branch/service: Soviet Army; Ukrainian Air Force; Ukrainian Ground Forces; Operational Command North; First Separate Special Forces Brigade, named after Ivan Bohun.
- Years of service: 1987–1991 (Soviet Army); 1992–1996 (Ukrainian Air Force); 2014–2019 (Aidar Battalion); 2022 (Ukrainian Ground Forces)
- Rank: Major
- Battles/wars: Russo-Ukrainian War; War in Donbas (2014–2022); 2022 Russian invasion of Ukraine
- Awards: Order of Bohdan Khmelnytsky 3rd class

Ihor Lapin (born 28 May 1969) is a Ukrainian lawyer and politician who is a former (2014–2019) member of the Parliament of Ukraine.

During the war in Donbas he was the commander of the 2nd assault squadron "West" of the 24th Battalion of Territorial Defense "Aidar" of the Armed Forces of Ukraine, formed mainly from volunteers from Volyn Region.

During the Russian invasion of Ukraine, he was the commander of a Special Forces Battalion of the First Separate Special Forces Brigade, named after Ivan Bohun.

Before the war, he worked as a lawyer, and was a member of the Bar Qualification-Disciplinary Commission of Volyn Region.

== Biography ==
Ihor Lapin was born on 28 May 1969 in Ivanychi, Volyn Oblast, Ukraine. In 1986, he graduated from high school number 1 in Kovel. In the same year, he entered the historical faculty of the Lutsk Pedagogical Institute. After a year of study, he went to serve in the army.

From 1988 to 1992 he studied at the Kurgan higher military-political aviation school (KVVPAU), officer with higher military specialty "social teacher". He graduated with honours. He swore an oath to the people of Ukraine in 1992. From 1992 to 1996, he served in the aerodrome operation company of the Lutsk Air Base (military unit 42198). He was the company's deputy commander and was promoted to senior lieutenant. He was released to a reserve unit for health reasons.

From 1993 to 1997 he studied law at the Ivan Franko National University of Lviv. From 1997 to 2014, he worked as a lawyer for the Volyn Regional Bar Association, and was a member of the Bar Qualification-Disciplinary Commission of the Volyn Region.

Starting in December 2013, he participated in Euromaidan. In June 2014, he voluntarily joined the Armed Forces of Ukraine. In 2017, he was awarded the military rank of Captain. In 2019, he was a co-coordinator of the Movement of Resistance to Capitulation (ROK). In March 2022, Ihor Lapin was appointed as the commander of a Special Forces Battalion in the First Separate Special Purpose Brigade, named after Ivan Bohun. That year, he was awarded the military rank of Major.

=== Russo-Ukrainian War ===
From June 2014, he took part in the Anti Terrorist operation (ATO), and was elected as the commander of the 2nd assault squadron "West" of the 24th Battalion of Territorial Defense "Aidar" (military unit PP V 0624), which is subordinated to the Armed Forces of Ukraine. He had the pseudonym "Zola", and because of that, his assault squadron was called "zolushky".

During the ATO, he was distinguished as a professional and responsible commander. Under his command, eight settlements were liberated in Luhansk Region, particularly Shchastia, Georgievka, Lutugino, Uspenska, Novosvitlivka and Khryaschuvate, and other strategically important objects.

"Zola's" assault unit took part in the liberation of Krasny Yar. During the liberation of Vergunsky Rozizd near Luhansk they killed members of the "Batman" group.

The liberation of Georgiivka under Lapin's command was marked as a breakthrough in the blockade of the Luhansk Airport.

After the 2014 Ukrainian parliamentary election, the People's deputy of Ukraine Ihor Lapin went to the zone of the ATO to help soldiers, shoving and teaching them skills and experience of conducting military operations.

Captain Ihor Lapin was back on the frontlines of the war since the outset of the full-scale Russian invasion of Ukraine, participating in combat operations near Hostomel Airport and Irpin, Kyiv region. Also, Lapin and ROK’s coordinators formed the "Free Ukraine" volunteer battalion, which played a critical role in the defence of Kyiv. In March 2022, Ihor Lapin was appointed as the commander of a Special Forces Battalion of the First Separate Special Forces Brigade, named after Ivan Bohun.

In recognition of his outstanding service and dedication to the Ukrainian Armed Forces, Ihor Lapin was awarded the military rank of Major on May 6, 2022. The Special Forces Battalion, under the leadership of Major Ihor Lapin, played a critical role in combat operations in eastern Ukraine. They were instrumental in defending the city of Popasna and several settlements, including Troitskoye, Roty, Vozdvizhenka, and Krinichnoye near the city of Bakhmut.

Major Ihor Lapin suffered a severe injury during combat in the fall of 2022 and was subsequently dismissed from the Armed Forces of Ukraine.

== Public and political activity ==
In 2010 Ihor Lapin ran for the position of mayor of Kovel, with the support of the "Country Party".

Starting in December 2013 he was on the Euromaidan, an active participant in the revolutionary events of the winter 2013–2014, and was a member of the public organization for the protection of public order.

On August 14, 2014, he became a member of the Military Council of the Political Party "People's Front".

In the October 2014 Ukrainian parliamentary election, he was elected to the Verkhovna Rada (Ukraine's parliament) with the support of the "People's Front" in the single-mandate majority district No. 22 in Lutsk with 24.24% of the votes. A member of the "People's Front", he sat on the Verkhovna Rada Committee for Legal Policy and Justice. He was the First Deputy Chairman of the Special Control Privatization Commission of the Verkhovna Rada of Ukraine. Gains for patriotic and military education, for the creation of territorial defense units and reserve army. He defended state interests in matters of privatization of key objects. He advocated for the recognition of Russia as an aggressor state and the fact of a war with Russia on the territory of Ukraine.

In the 2019 Ukrainian parliamentary election Lapin was not high enough on the election list (placed 49th) of European Solidarity to get reelected. The party won 23 seats on the nationwide party list and two constituency seats.

After President Zelenskyy's team took office following victory in the election, Ihor Lapin continued his activities in civic engagement. In response to the perceived threat of Ukraine's leadership signing treacherous capitulation agreements after the Oman secret meeting, Ihor Lapin became a co-coordinator of the Movement of Resistance to Capitulation (ROK) in 2019. From 2019 to 2022 ROK played a vital role in mobilizing the public through a combination of civic protests and educational campaigns.

Legislative cooperation with the parliament, the fight against the influence of clan-oligarchic structures on the state institutions of Ukraine and the popularization of preparations for repelling the Russian invasion are the main activities of Ihor Lapin until 02/24/2022.

== Awards ==
- Recipient of the Order of Bohdan Khmelnytsky, 3rd class (December 26, 2014) — for personal courage and heroism in the defense of state sovereignty and territorial integrity of Ukraine
- President of Ukraine award - jubilee medal "25 years of independence of Ukraine" (2016)
- Award of the Main Directorate of Military Intelligence of the Ministry of Defense of Ukraine "For the assistance of the Military Intelligence of Ukraine" I degree.
- Award of the Main Directorate of Military Intelligence of the Ministry of Defense of Ukraine "For the assistance of the Military Intelligence of Ukraine" ІІ degree.
- Award of the Main Directorate of Military Intelligence of the Ministry of Defense of Ukraine "Eugene Bereznyak".
- Award from the Minister of Internal Affairs of Ukraine - firearm.
