= Lviv–Volyn coal basin =

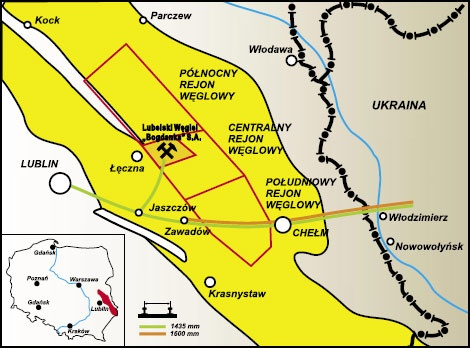
The Lviv–Volyn coal basin is to the east of the Lublin coal basin (highlighted)

The Lviv–Volyn coal basin (Ukrainian: Львівсько-Волинський вугільний басейн) is a coal basin within the Lviv Oblast and Volyn Oblast of Ukraine. In the western direction in continues into Poland, Lublin coal basin. Its area is about 10,000 km^{2}.

== Location and geology ==
Lviv-Volyn coal basin is located in the drainage basin of the Buh river and covers part of the historical regions of Galicia, Volhynia and Kholmshchyna. Geographically, it lies in the territories of Volhynia-Kholm Upland, Buh Depression and parts of northern Opillia and eastern Roztochia. It spans from the city of Volodymyr in the north to Zolochiv in the southeast. The basin has a length of 125 kilometers and a width of 60 kilometers; its total area is around 10,000 sq. km, with industrial coal layers taking 1,000 sq. km. Coal layers in the basin lie on average depths of 250-750 meters, with the depth and layer thickness increasing in a westward direction. The local coal has a good quality and contains low amounts of gas

== History ==
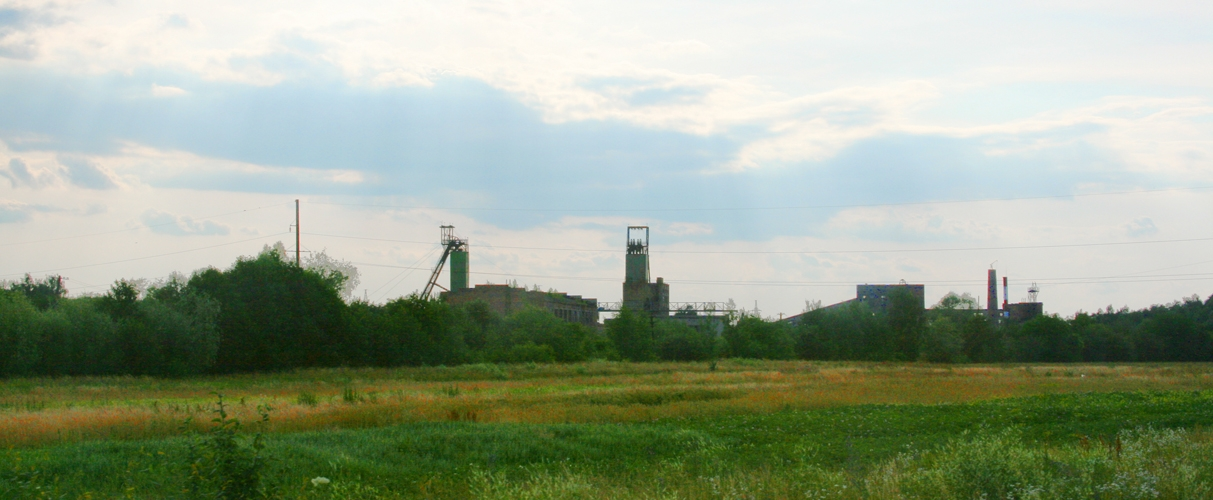
One of the mines in Sheptytskyi (former Chervonohrad)

Coal reserves in the area were first discovered during the 1930s under the rule of Poland. After 1945, surveys of the basin continued. At the time, it was estimated to contain 1,75 billion tons of coal, which was equivalent to 1% of all coal deposits in the Soviet Union. In 1950 construction of mines started, and starting from 1954 coal production commenced in the basin. Between 1958 and 1961 coal production in the basin grew from 1,9 to 5,4 million tonnes, and comprised 3,2% of the whole coal production in the Ukrainian SSR. As of 1961, 15 mines were active in the area. The number of mine employees in the basin as of 1960 reached 35,000 people.

Coal production in the Lviv-Volyn basin allowed the economy Western Ukraine to abandon its reliance on Donbas and Silesian coal and contributed to the development of local industry, in particular establishment of a power plant in Dobrotvir. As a result of the basin's establishment, a number of mining towns appeared in the region, including Novovolynsk and Zhovtneve in Volyn Oblast, as well as Chervonohrad, Hirnyk and Sosnivka in Lviv Oblast.
