= Kovel urban hromada =

Urban hromada in Volyn Oblast, Ukraine

Kovel urban hromada Ковельська міська громада
- Hromada
- Seal
- Interactive map of Kovel urban hromada
- Country: Ukraine
- Oblast: Volyn
- Raion: Kovel
- Admin. center: Kovel

Area
  - Total: 104.2 km^{2} (40.2 sq mi)

Population (2023)
  - Total: 74,925
  - Density: 719.0/km^{2} (1,862/sq mi)
- CATOTTG code: UA07060190000036342
- Settlements: 15
- Cities: 1
- Villages: 14
- Website: www.kovelrada.gov.ua

Kovel urban territorial hromada (Ukrainian: Ковельська міська територіальна громада, romanized: Kovelska miska terytorialna hromada) is one of the hromadas of Ukraine, located in Kovel Raion in the north-western Volyn Oblast. Its administrative centre is the city of Kovel.

Kovel urban hromada has an area of 311.1 km^{2} (120.1 mi^{2}). It also has a population of 74,925 (as of 2023).

== Composition ==
In addition to one city (Kovel), the hromada includes 14 villages:

- Bilyn
- Dorotyshche
- Hishyn
- Horodylets
- Klevetsk
- Kolodnytsia
- Lapni
- Liubche
- Ruzhyn
- Toikut
- Volia
- Volia-Kovelska
- Zarichchia
- Zelena

== Geographic characteristics ==
Kovelsky urban hromada is located on the Polesian Lowland in Volyn Polissya. The relief of the district is flat, partly lowland, covered with pine and oak forests.

Kovelsky urban hromada has reserves of silt, sapropel, peat.

The climate of the region is moderately continental: winter is mild, with unstable frosts; summer is warm, not hot. Most often, comfortable weather is observed in the summer months. The formation of stable snow cover is noted in the second decade of December. The average height of the snow cover can reach 10 cm.

The rivers Turia (Prypiat basin) flow through the urban hromada. A reservoir has been built in the city of Kovel on the Turia River.

The soils are mainly sod-podzolic.

The structure of the forests is dominated by coniferous species of trees. Logging is developed in the region. Kovel forests are rich in mushrooms and berries. Among the mushrooms, chanterelles, tricholoma equestre, suillus luteus, armillaria mellea, russula, and porcini mushrooms predominate. The most common berries are blueberries, raspberries, and blackberries.

Among the animals of the forests of the region, the most typical are moose, roe deer, wild boar, badger, fox, marten, otter, wolf, hare - brown hare, muskrat, and ferret. Among the birds, there are black grouse, capercaillie, and hazel grouse. Migratory routes of birds run through the territory of the region. Carp, crucian carp, pike, bream, and catfish are common in the rivers and lakes of the region.

== Transport ==
A number of important transport corridors pass through the district, including the European highways E85 and E373, the railway runs towards Chełm, Lviv and Brest.
