= Ivanychi =

Rural locality in Volyn Oblast, Ukraine

- Rural settlement
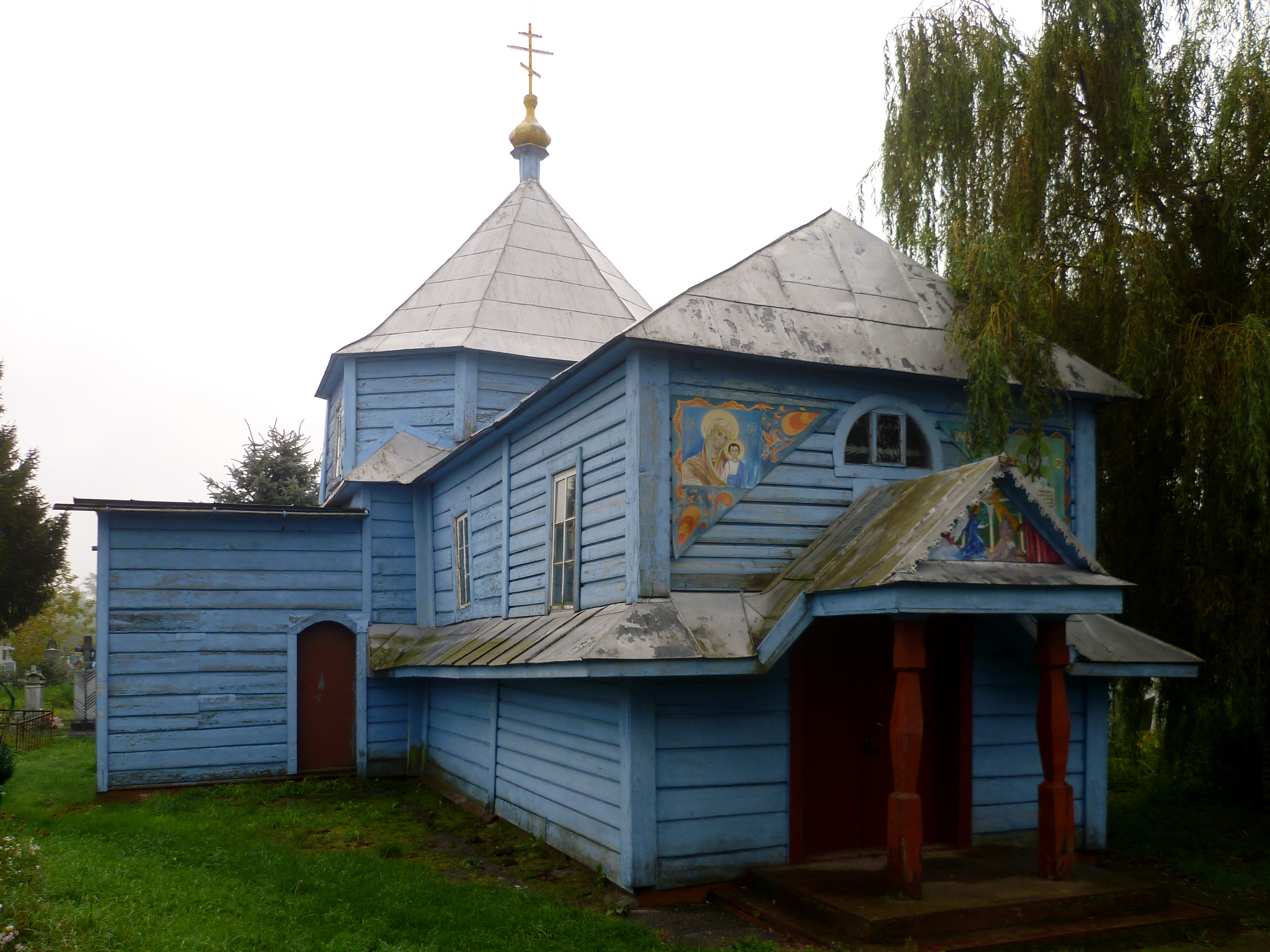
- Maryrs of Sebastia Church

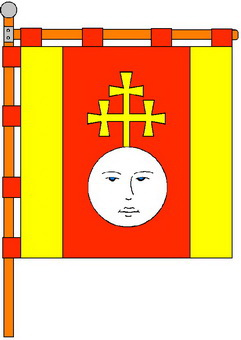
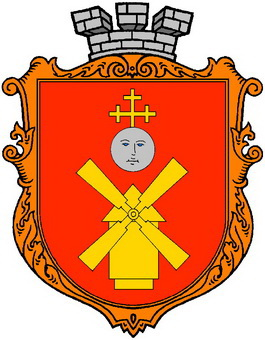
- Flag Coat of arms

- Location in Volyn Oblast, Ukraine Ivanychi (Ukraine)
- Coordinates: 50°38′N 24°21′E
- Country: Ukraine
- Oblast: Volyn Oblast
- Raion: Volodymyr Raion
- Hromada: Ivanychi settlement hromada
- First mentioned: 1545

Area
  - Total: 23.6 km^{2} (9.1 sq mi)

Population (2022)
  - Total: 6,260
  - Density: 265/km^{2} (687/sq mi)
- Time zone: UTC+2 (EET)
  - Summer (DST): UTC+3 (EEST)

Ivanychi (Ukrainian: Іваничі; Polish: Iwanicze) is a rural settlement in Volyn Oblast, western Ukraine. It is located in the historic region of Volhynia. It is the administrative seat of Ivanychi settlement hromada. Population: 6,260 (2022 estimate).

== History ==
The first mention of Ivanychi in historical documents dates back to 1545. After the Union of Lublin in 1569, the village came under the rule of noble Poland. In 1629, there were 68 households in the village. And at the beginning of 1919, Ivanychi came under the rule of Poland, and in 1939 the village was captured by Soviet troops, and it was annexed to the Ukrainian SSR. In Soviet times it was the centre of Ivanychi Raion.

In 1995, the coat of arms and flag of Ivanychi were approved.

Until 26 January 2024, Ivanychi was designated urban-type settlement. On this day, a new law entered into force which abolished this status, and Ivanychi became a rural settlement.

== Geography ==
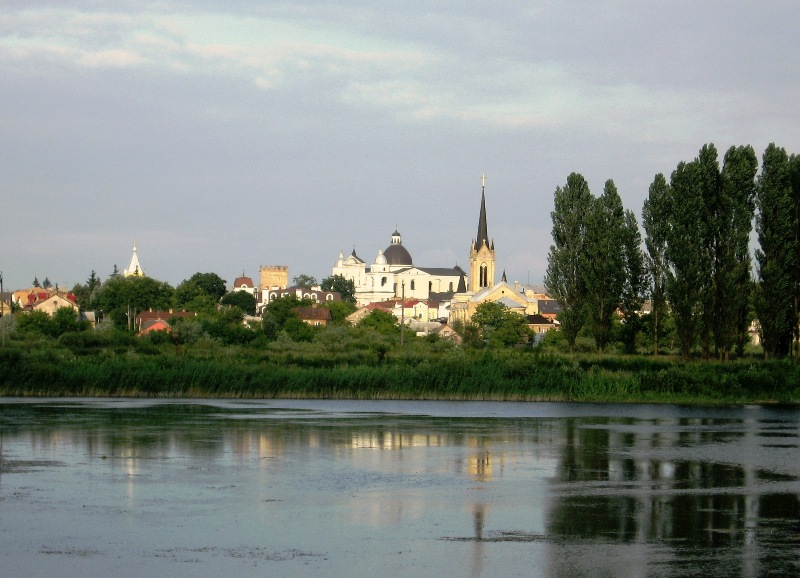
Lutsk old town and the Styr

The area of the district is 710,1 hectares.

Ivanychi is located in the southern part of Volyn region, 89 km from the regional center (Lutsk). The larger area of the district is located in the Volhynian Upland . The area of the area is located in the area of mixed forests and the river basin Luha (tributary of the Bug). The climate is moderately continental with mild winters (in January -4.4 °, -5.1 °) and warm wet summer (in July +18.8 °). Rainfall 550–640 mm per year.

== Transport ==
The Ivanychi railway station is located on the Kovel-Lviv line. The village has a bus connection by highways with the cities of Novovolynsk, Volodymyr, Horokhiv, Lutsk.

== Notable people ==
- Ihor Lapin - Ukrainian lawyer, politician and military commander.
- Oksana Kukhta - Ukrainian wrestler.
