= Radio 4U =

Ukrainian radio station

- Country: Ukraine
- First air date: 5 February 2009
- Availability: Ukraine
- Owner: Private
- Key people: Roman Zając (in the past)
- Dissolved: October 2009
- Digital channel(s): Lviv - 91.1; Tarnopol - 106.1; Ivano-Frankivsk - 100.9; Novovolynsk - 106.8
- Official website: http://www.radio4u.com.ua/
- Language: Ukrainian

Radio 4U (Ukrainian: Радіо 4U) was a Ukrainian radio station owned by German Bauer Media Group, which was later sold to a private company. Primaly the station was owned by RMF FM as an attempt to expand internationally, but as previous owners sold RMF to Bauer, Radio 4U also has become the property of the Germans. The station was available in 4 towns of Western Ukraine - Lviv, on 91.1 MHz, Tarnopol, on 106.1 MHz, Ivano-Frankivsk, on 100.9 MHz and Novovolynsk, on 106.8 MHz. Radio 4U started broadcasting on 5 February 2009. In Lviv it replaced RadioMan. Slogan of the station was Найкраща Музика для Тебе (The best Music for You). Radio broadcast news (Факти, Fakty) every hour. Eight times a day local information were broadcast. The headquarters of the radio were in Lviv. In October 2009 the station was closed and the journalists were fired. Reason for closure was selling the station to investor group Нова Хвиля (New Wave). Now at a frequency of 91.1 MHz in Lviv Радіо Шарманка (Radio Organ) will be heard.
