= Novovolynsk urban hromada =

Novovolynsk urban hromada Нововолинська міська громада
- Hromada
- Interactive map of Novovolynsk urban hromada
- Country: Ukraine
- Oblast: Volyn
- Raion: Volodymyr
- Admin. center: Novovolynsk

Area
  - Total: 75.3 km^{2} (29.1 sq mi)

Population (2020)
  - Total: 58,809
  - Density: 781/km^{2} (2,020/sq mi)
- CATOTTG code: UA07020130000036300
- Settlements: 8
- Cities: 1
- Rural settlements: 1
- Villages: 6

Novovolynsk urban territorial hromada (Ukrainian: Нововолинська міська територіальна громада) is one of the hromadas of Ukraine, located in Volodymyr Raion in Volyn Oblast. Its administrative centre is the city of Novovolynsk.

The hromada has an area of 75.3 km^{2} (29.1 mi^{2}), as well as a population of 58,809 (as of 2020).

Formed by the order of the Cabinet of Ministers of Ukraine dated June 12, 2020 No. 708-r "On determining the administrative centers and approving the territories of territorial communities of the Volyn Oblast" by uniting territorial communities subordinate to the Novovolynsk City Council and two village councils of the Ivanychi Raion of the Volyn Oblast - Hrybovytsia and Hriady.

With the adoption of the Resolution of the Verkhovna Rada of Ukraine "On the formation and liquidation of raions" on July 17, 2020, the territory of the Novovolynsk urban hromada was assigned to the enlarged Volodymyr-Volynskyi Raion of the Volyn Oblast.

The first elections to the community council (Novovolynsk City Council) were held on October 25, 2020.

== Composition ==
In addition to one city (Novovolynsk), the hromada contains 1 rural settlement (Blahodatne) and 6 villages:

- Hriady
- Hrybovytsia
- Kropyvshchyna
- Nyzkynychi
- Tyshkovychi
- Khreniv
