= Serhiy Chapko =

Ukrainian footballer

Personal information
- Full name: Serhiy Chapko
- Date of birth: 24 January 1988 (age 38)
- Place of birth: Kovel, Ukrainian SSR, Soviet Union
- Height: 1.77 m (5 ft 9 1/2 in)
- Position: Midfielder

Youth career
- 2001–2004: Volyn Lutsk
- 2004: Dynamo Kyiv

Senior career*
Years	Team	Apps	(Gls)
2004–2005	Volyn Lutsk	0	(0)
2004	→ Ikva Mlyniv (loan)	1	(0)
2005–2007	Metalurh Donetsk	0	(0)
2008	Lviv	13	(0)
2008	Zakarpattia Uzhhorod	1	(0)
2009	Enerhetyk Burshtyn	16	(3)
2010	Flota Świnoujście	2	(0)
2010	Motor Lublin	6	(0)
2011	Olimpia Bălți	5	(0)
2011	Lviv	10	(2)
2012	Enerhetyk Burshtyn	2	(0)
2014–2017	Kovel-Volyn Kovel (amateur)		
- * Club domestic league appearances and goals

Serhiy Chapko (Ukrainian: Сергій Чапко; born 24 January 1988) is a Ukrainian former professional footballer who played as a midfielder.
