= Turiya (river) =

River in Ukraine

Turiia
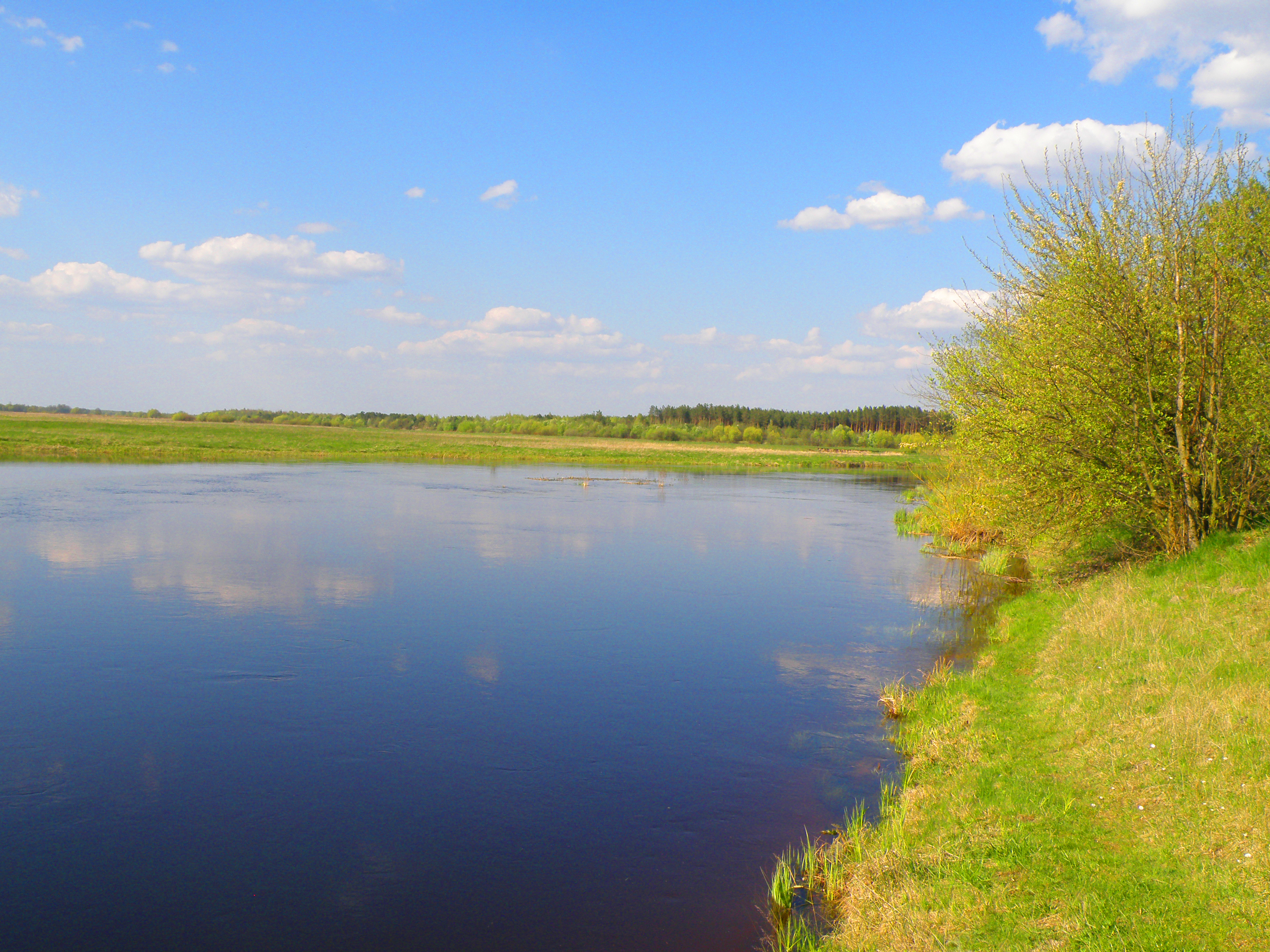

Physical characteristics
- Mouth: Pripyat
  - coordinates: 51°47′40″N 24°51′36″E
- Length: 184 km (114 mi)
- Basin size: 2,800 km^{2} (1,100 sq mi)
- Discharge
  - average: 9 m³/s

Basin features
- Progression: Pripyat→ Dnieper→ Dnieper–Bug estuary→ Black Sea

The Turiia (Ukrainian: Турія) is a river in Volyn Oblast, Ukraine. It is a right tributary of the Pripyat. It is 184 kilometres (114 mi) long, and has a drainage basin of 2,800 square kilometres (1,100 sq mi).

== Description ==
=== Location ===
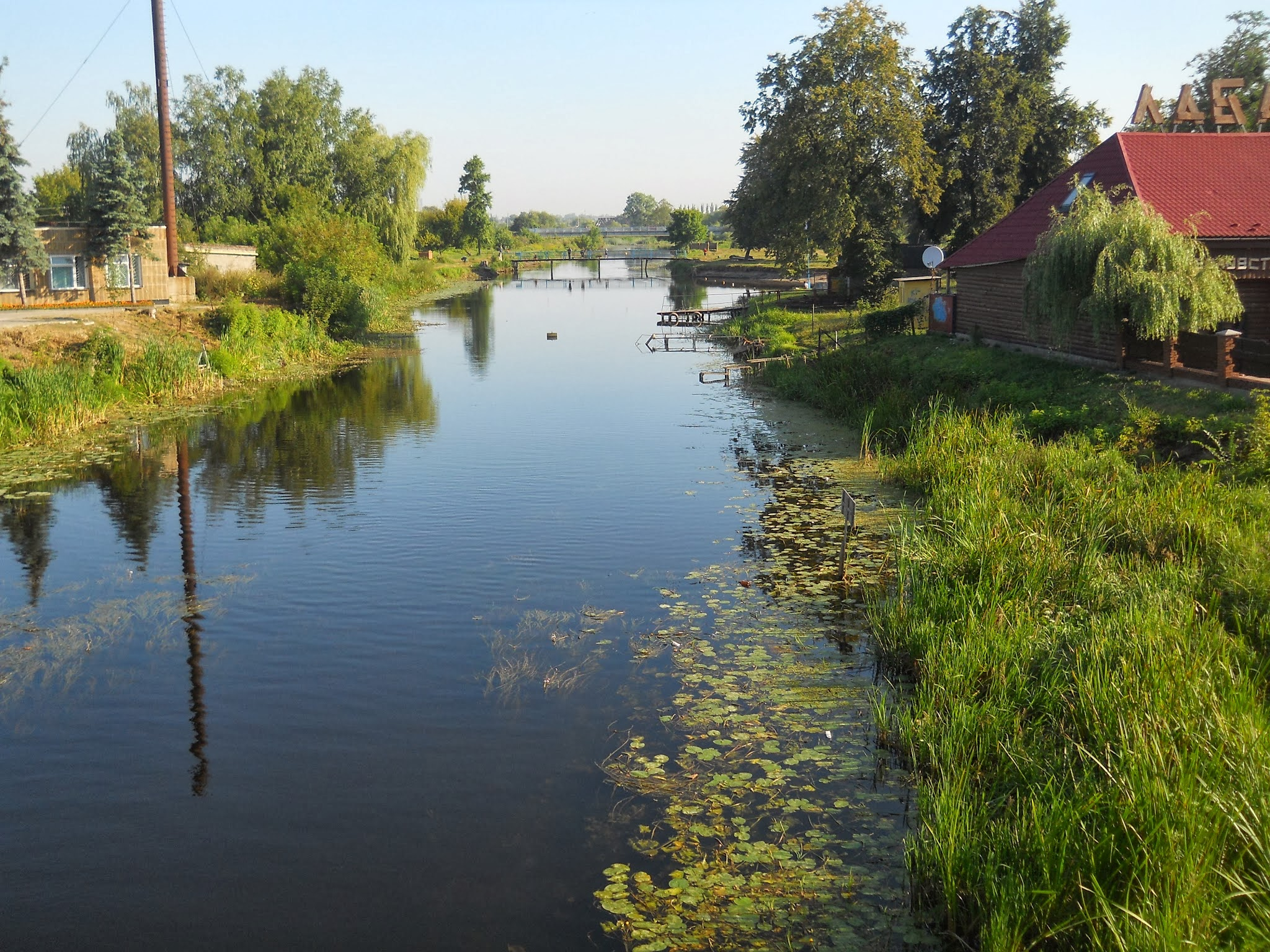
Turiia in the city of Kovel

The river Turiia originates on the northern slopes of the Volhynian Upland at an altitude of more than 250 m, near the village of Zaturtsi, Volodymyr Raion, Volyn Oblast. It flows through the Polesian Lowland to the northwest to the Volyn Range, then turns northeast and in the middle and lower reaches flows north. It flows into the Pripyat to the northwest of the village of Shchytyn.

=== Characteristics ===
The length of the river is 184 km, the basin area is 2900 km². The valley is mainly trapezoidal, its width is up to 2 km. In the lower reaches, the valley widens, becomes indistinct. The floodplain extends in width from 0.3-0.8 km in the upper reaches to 3–4 km near the mouth. Almost throughout the floodplain there is high marshland. There are old trees in the floodplain. The riverbed is winding, with meanders, deepened and widened for 45 km. The width of the river is from 8–10 m to 25 m (on the flats and in the deepened areas). The slope of the river is 0.37 m/km.

The river Turiia is fed by groundwater of the Cretaceous horizon and atmospheric precipitation. The river basin is largely forested. About 20% of the basin is meliorated by canals.

There is a reservoir in the city of Kovel within the river, with a water surface area of 54.8 ha, a volume of 1.27 million m^{3}.

=== Climate ===
The climate of the region is moderately continental: winter is mild, with unstable frosts; summer is warm, not hot. Most often, comfortable weather is observed in the summer months. The formation of stable snow cover is noted in the second decade of December.

Freezes in December, thaws at the end of March. The mineralization of the river water near Kovel is on average 391 mg/dm³ in the spring flood; 458 mg/dm³ in the summer-autumn low tide; 569 mg/dm³ in the winter low tide.

=== Nature protection ===
The ecosystem of the lower reaches of the river is protected in the Turiia hydrological reserve of local significance.

The territory of the Turia outflow belongs to the hydrological natural monument of local importance "The Outflow of the Turiia River" of the Volyn Oblast.

== Settlements ==
The village of Turiisk and the city of Kovel are located above the Turiia. It flows through Volodymyr, Kovel, and Kamin-Kashyrskyi raions (districts) of Volyn Oblast.

== Bibliography ==
- Національний атлас України/НАН України, Інститут географії, Державна служба геодезії, картографії та кадастру; голов. ред. Л. Г. Руденко; голова ред. кол.Б.Є. Патон. — К.: ДНВП «Картографія», 2007. — 435 с. — 5 тис.прим. — ISBN 978-966-475-067-4.
- Мольчак Я. О. Річки Волині / Я. О. Мольчак, Р. В. Мігас. – Луцьк: Надстир’я, 1999. – 176 с.
