= Blahodatne, Volyn Oblast =

Rural locality in Volyn Oblast, Ukraine

Blahodatne Благодатне
- Rural settlement
- Location within Volyn Oblast Location within Ukraine
- Coordinates: 50°39′45″N 24°15′3″E
- Country: Ukraine
- Oblast: Volyn Oblast
- Raion: Volodymyr Raion
- Hromada: Novovolynsk urban hromada

Population (2022)
  - Total: 4,575
- Time zone: UTC+2 (EET)
  - Summer (DST): UTC+3 (EEST)

Blahodatne (Ukrainian: Благодатне), formerly Zhovtneve (Ukrainian: Жовтневе), is a rural settlement in Novovolynsk urban hromada, Volodymyr Raion, Volyn Oblast, western Ukraine. Population: 4,575 (2022 estimate).

== History ==
On 21 May 2016, Verkhovna Rada adopted decision to rename Zhovtneve to Blahodatne according to the law prohibiting names of Communist origin.

Until 26 January 2024, Blahodatne was designated urban-type settlement. On this day, a new law entered into force which abolished this status, and Blahodatne became a rural settlement.

== Economy ==
=== Transportation ===
There is a railway line at the southern edge of the settlement connecting Novovolynsk and Ivanychi, however, there is no passenger traffic and no passenger station in Blahodatne.

A paved road connects Blahodatne with Novovolynsk in the northwest and Horokhiv via Ivanychi in the southeast.
