= Ivanychi Raion =

Former subdivision of Volyn Oblast, Ukraine

Coordinates: 50°30′N 24°47′E

Ivanychi Raion Іваничівський район
- Raion
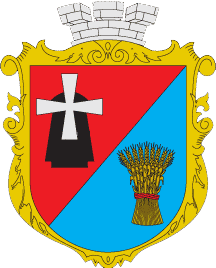
- Flag Coat of arms

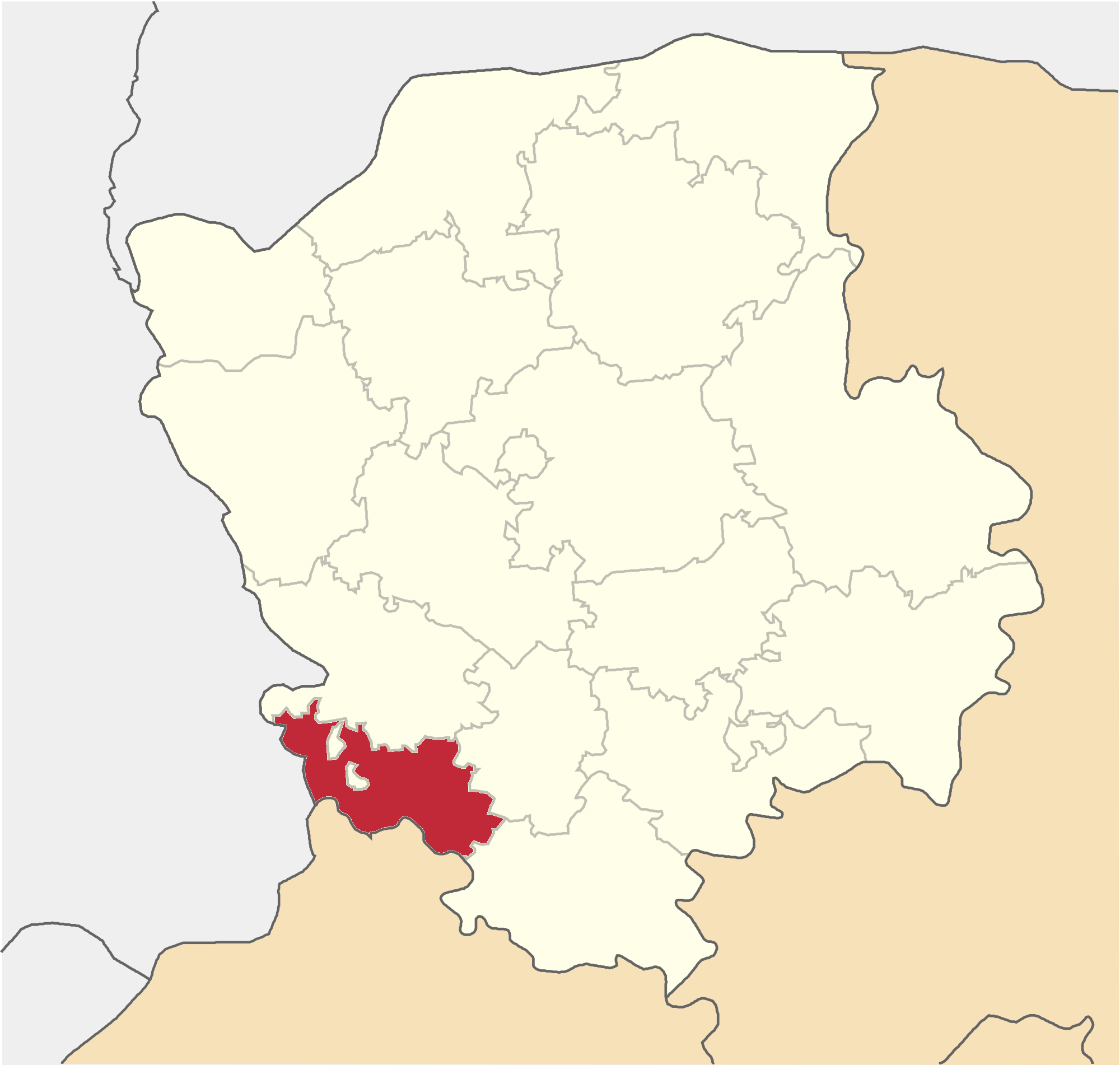
- Country: Ukraine
- Oblast: Volyn Oblast
- Established: 1966
- Disestablished: 18 July 2020
- Admin. center: Ivanychi
- Subdivisions: List: — city councils; — settlement councils; — rural councils; Number of localities: — cities; — urban-type settlements; 58 — villages; — rural settlements

Area
  - Total: 645 km^{2} (249 sq mi)

Population (2020)
  - Total: 31,231
  - Density: 48.4/km^{2} (125/sq mi)
- Time zone: UTC+02:00 (EET)
  - Summer (DST): UTC+03:00 (EEST)
- Area code: 380-3372
- Website: http://ivaadm.gov.ua/ Ivanychivskyi Raion

Ivanychi Raion (Ukrainian: Іваничівський район) was a raion in Volyn Oblast in western Ukraine. Its administrative center was the urban-type settlement of Ivanychi. The raion was abolished and its territory was merged into Volodymyr-Volynskyi Raion on 18 July 2020 as part of the administrative reform of Ukraine, which reduced the number of raions of Volyn Oblast to four. The last estimate of the raion population was 31,231 (2020 est.)

== See also ==
- Administrative divisions of Volyn Oblast
