= Ustyluh =

City in Volyn Oblast, Ukraine

Ustyluh Устилуг Uściług • אוסטיל
- City
- Igor Stravinsky house

- Seal
- Interactive map of Ustyluh
- Location within Volyn Oblast Location within Ukraine
- Coordinates: 50°51′36″N 24°09′25″E
- Country: Ukraine
- Oblast: Volyn Oblast
- Raion: Volodymyr Raion
- Hromada: Ustyluh urban hromada

Government
  - Mayor: Viktor Polishchuk
- Elevation: 188 m (617 ft)

Population (2022)
  - Total: 2,060

Ustyluh (Note: Ukrainian: Устилуг, IPA: [ʊstɪˈluɦ]; Polish: Uściług; Russian: Устилуг, romanized: Ustilug,Yiddish: אוסטילע, romanized: Ustile.) is a small city in Volodymyr Raion, Volyn Oblast, Ukraine. It is situated on the east side of the border with Poland, and 13 kilometres (8.1 mi) west of the city of Volodymyr. Population: 2,060 (2022 estimate).

Igor Stravinsky had an estate in Ustyluh and visited it frequently between 1890 and 1914. His mansion is now a museum.

== History ==
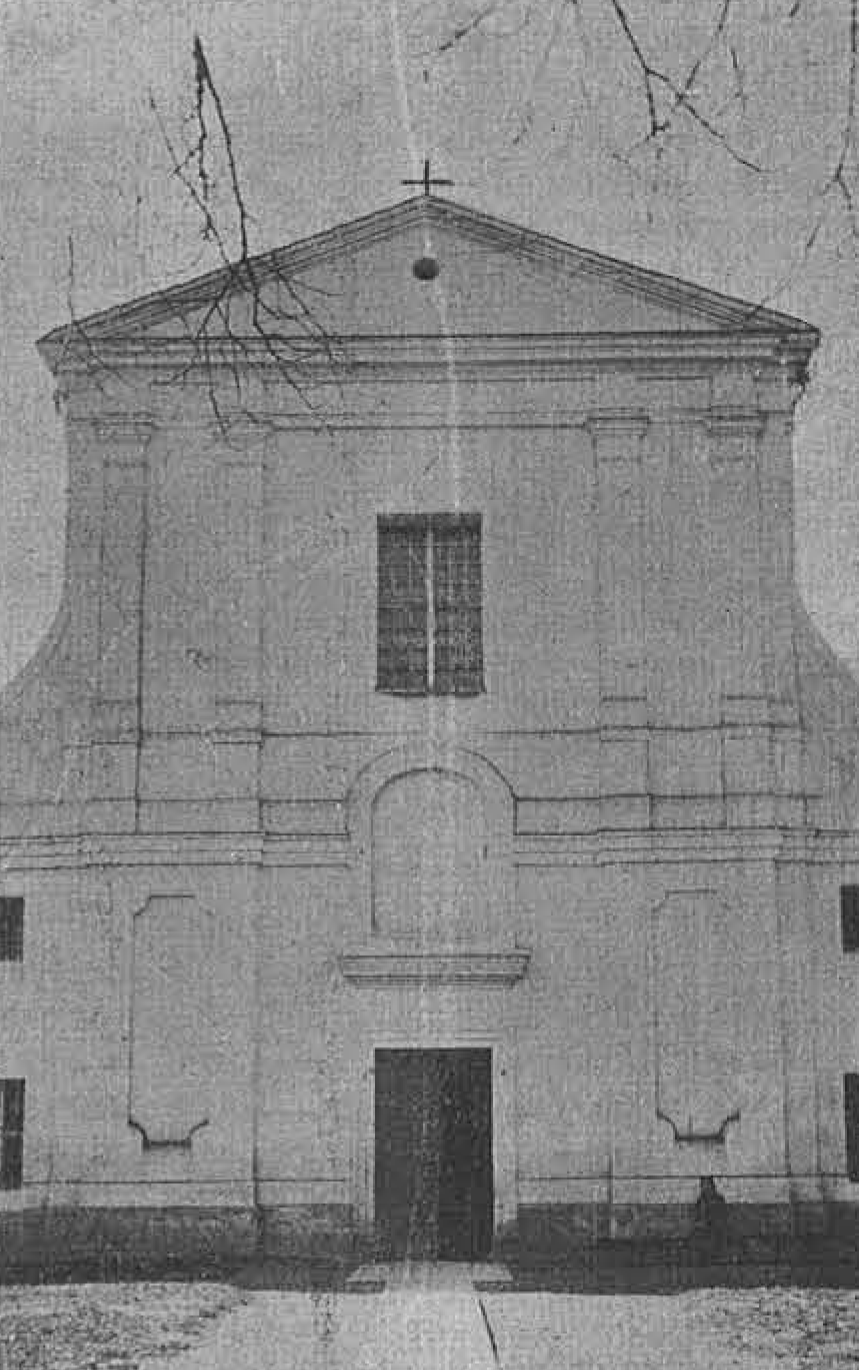
Capuchin church in the early 20th century

The oldest settlement in the territory of Ustyluh existed back in the Copper Age. During the times of Kievan Rus (9th to 12th centuries CE), there was a fortified settlement in the same location, with a necropolis nearby consisting of 29 burial mounds. In 1897, archaeologist Mykola Biliashivskyi excavated three of these mounds. Ustyluh was among the fortified towns taken by Volodymyr the Great. To this day, a pentagonal fortress remains, surrounded by earthen ramparts made of beaten clay, which in height are not inferior to the ramparts of Volodymyr's capital, and it is pierced from the east by the city gate.

Until the Russian Revolution of 1917, it was a settlement in Vladimir-Volynsky Uyezd of Volhynian Governorate of the Russian Empire; from 1921 to 1939 it was part of Wołyń Voivodeship of Poland, within which it had miasteczko (small town) status. According to the 1921 census, the population was 67.1% Jewish, 23.3% Polish, and 9.6% Ukrainian.

Following the German-Soviet invasion of Poland, which started World War II in September 1939, Uściług was occupied by the Soviet Union until 1941. It has been a town since 1940. The Germans bombarded the town heavily on the morning of 22 June 1941, the day of the outbreak of war between the Soviet Union and Germany. The German Army conquered the town toward evening. The Germans established a Jewish ghetto, a Judenrat, and a ghetto police force, and used the town's Jews for slave labor. From time to time the Germans took groups of Jewish youth to a valley next to the Jewish cemetery and shot them. In October 1941 alone, the Germans killed 900 Jews from the town intelligentsia. The Germans transferred the remaining Jews of Ustyluh to the Volodymyr ghetto between September 1 and 15, 1942, and murdered them there along with the local Jews in pits prepared for the killings in the village of Piatydnie.

In January 1989 the population was 2,404 people.

With the opening of the Ustyluh-Zosin international border crossing, the city's role has grown especially important. After Ukraine gained its independence, the Ustyluh-Zosin international border crossing with Poland was opened in the city. In August 2015, the city became the center of the newly created Ustyluh urban hromada.

== Demographics ==
As of the 2001 Ukrainian census, Ustyluh's population amounted to 2,276 inhabitants. The ethnic and linguistic composition of the population was as follows:

Ethnic groups in Ustyluh
	percent
Ukrainians	96.79%
Russians	2.15%
others	1.06%

Languages in Ustyluh
	percent
Ukrainian	98.1%
Russian	1.4%
Armenian	0.2%
Polish	0.1%
Belarusian	0.1%
others	0.1%
