= Luha (river) =

Luha / Lug
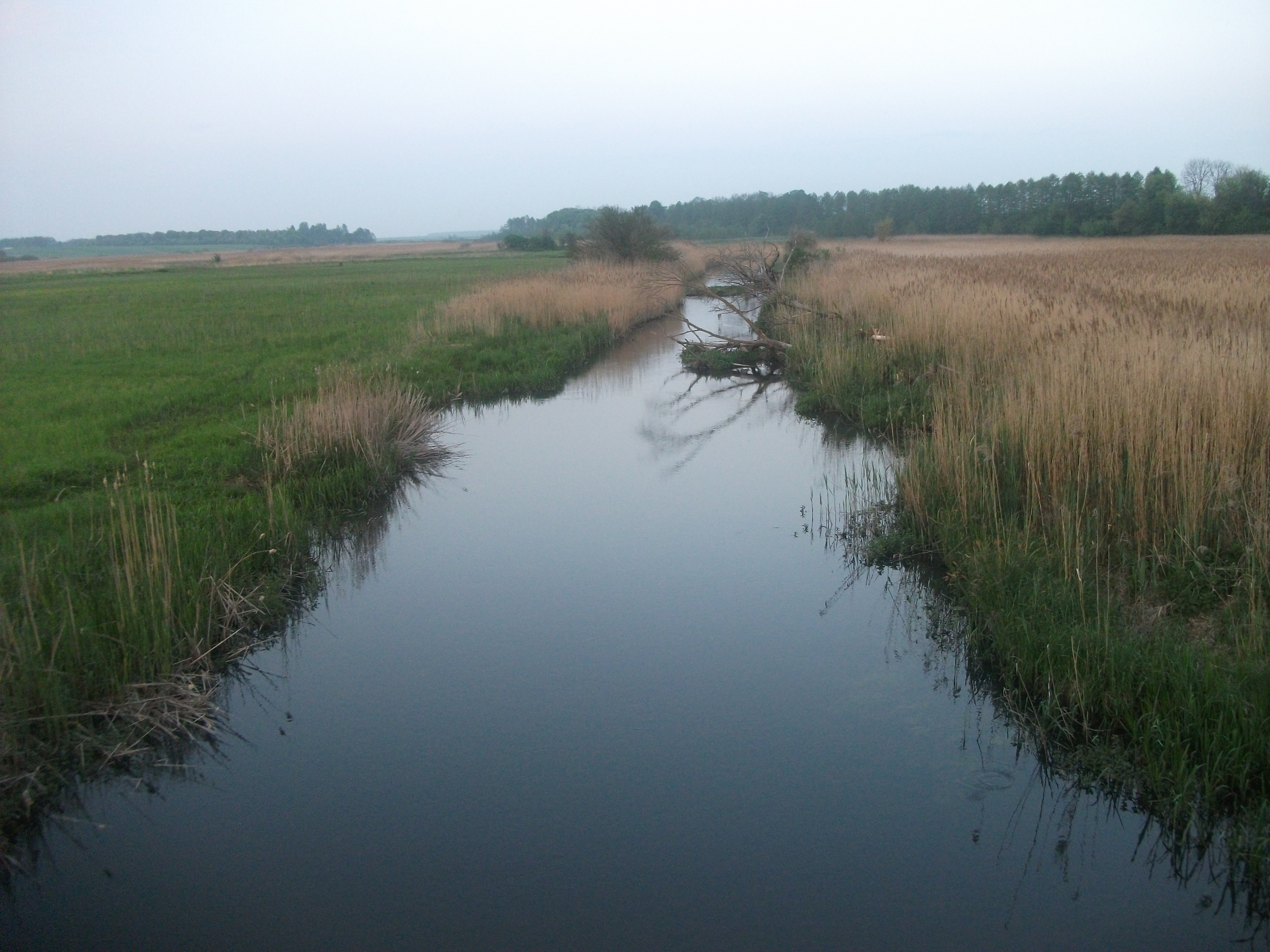

Location
- Country: Ukraine

Physical characteristics
- Source
  - location: village Kolpytiv, Lokachi Raion
- Mouth: Bug
  - coordinates: 50°52′02″N 24°08′44″E
- Length: 93 km (58 mi)
- Basin size: 1,348 km^{2} (520 sq mi)

Basin features
- Progression: Bug→ Narew→ Vistula→ Baltic Sea

The Luha (Ukrainian: Луга; Polish: Ług) is a river in Ukraine and a right tributary of the Bug (Vistula basin). The river flows through the Volodymyr district of the Volyn region. Luha is a flat river, 81 km long and not wide valley. The river is winding, the floodplain is swampy in places. Local nature reserves have been created in the river valley.

== Description ==
Its source is located near the village of Kolpytiv in the Volhynian Upland. In its upper reaches, the Luha runs mainly in a western, northwestern direction, and later northwards. In its lower stream, it runs mainly in a northwestern direction and enters the Western Bug on northwestern outskirts of the city of Ustyluh, near the border of Ukraine and Poland.

The length of the river is 81 km, the basin area is 1335 km². The slope of the river is 0.52 m/km. The valley is mainly trapezoidal, 0.2 - 0.8 km wide, 6 – 8 m high. The river floodplain is meadow, in places shrubby, its width increases with the length of the river by an average of 0.4-0.8 km. In the lower reaches, the valley widens, becomes indistinct.

Character of the river is plain as it flows through swampy floodplains.The river flows through a natural zone of broadleaf forests.

The climate of the region is moderately continental: winter is mild, with unstable frosts; summer is warm, not hot. Most often, comfortable weather is observed in the summer months. The formation of stable snow cover is noted in the second decade of December.

The river Luha is fed by groundwater and atmospheric precipitation. The average mineralization of the Luga River water (city of Volodymyr) is: spring flood — 467 mg/dm³; summer-autumn low — 484 mg/dm³; winter low — 506 mg/dm³.

Biggest tributaries: Luha-Svynoryika, Svynoryika, Rylovytsia (right side); Strypa (left side).

Major settlements along the river: Volodymyr, Ustyluh.

== Conservation ==
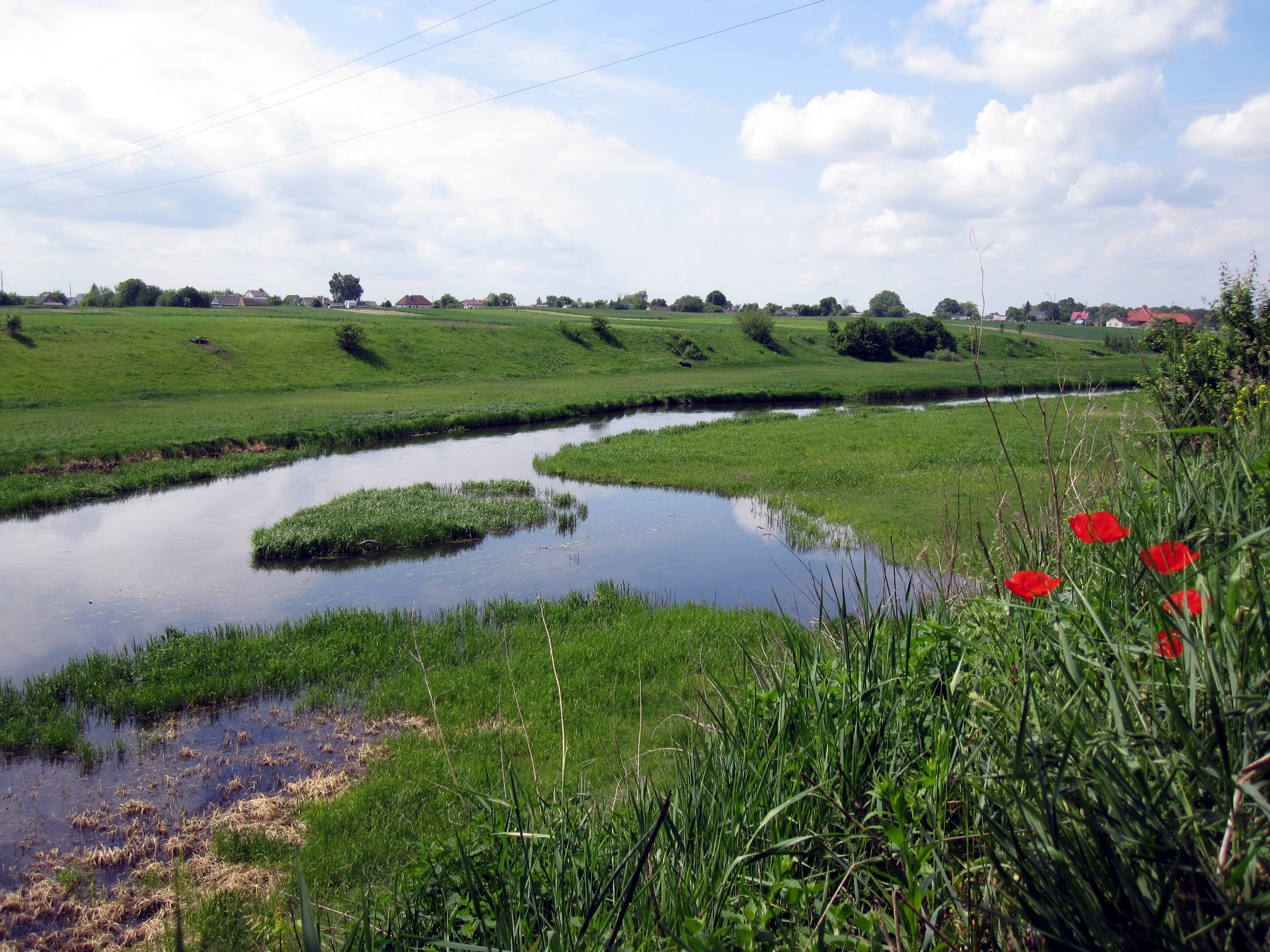
Reserve "Luha"

In 1993, a hydrological reserve of local importance has been created on the tributary of the Luga-Svinoryyka.

In 2000, local hydrological reserve "Luha" was created along the river. Created to preserve the water-meadow-marsh natural complex of the Luga River. The territory of the reserve covers the Luga River and the coastal part of its floodplain with old growth forests and marshes. The reserve is a nesting place for birds, in particular the Eurasian curlew - a species listed on the IUCN Red List and the European Red List.
