= Kovel =

City in Volyn Oblast, Ukraine

Kovel Ковель
- City
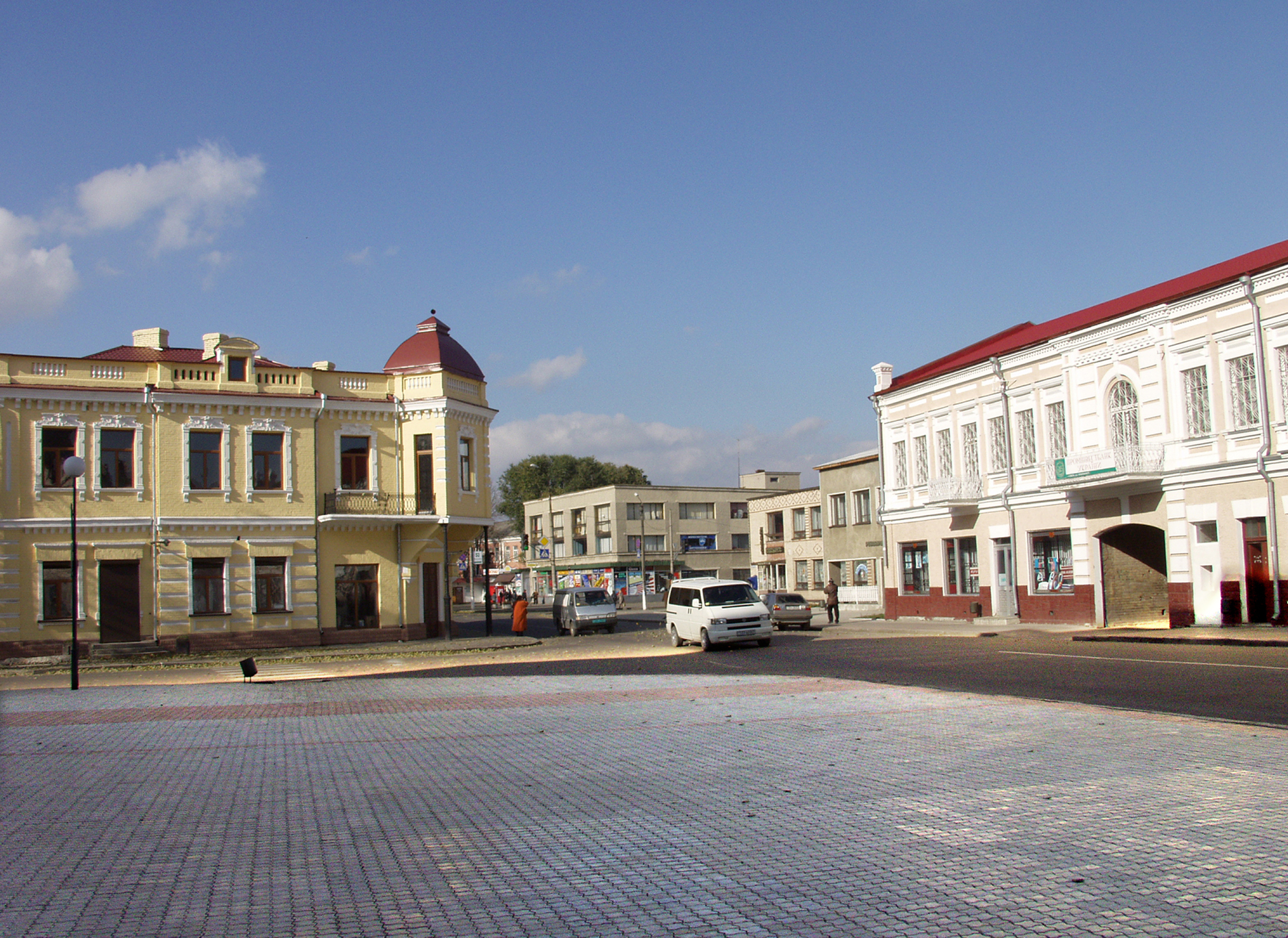
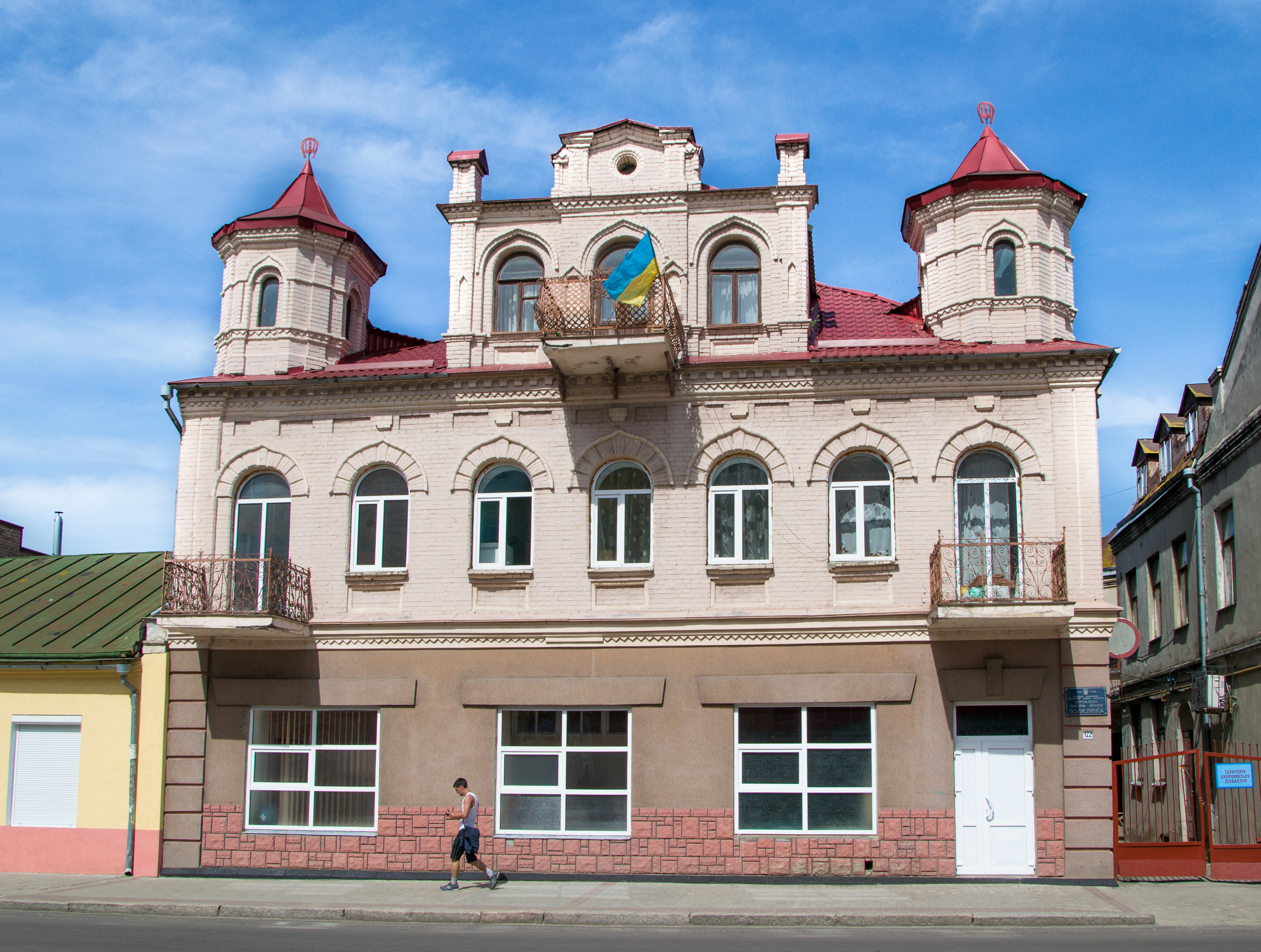
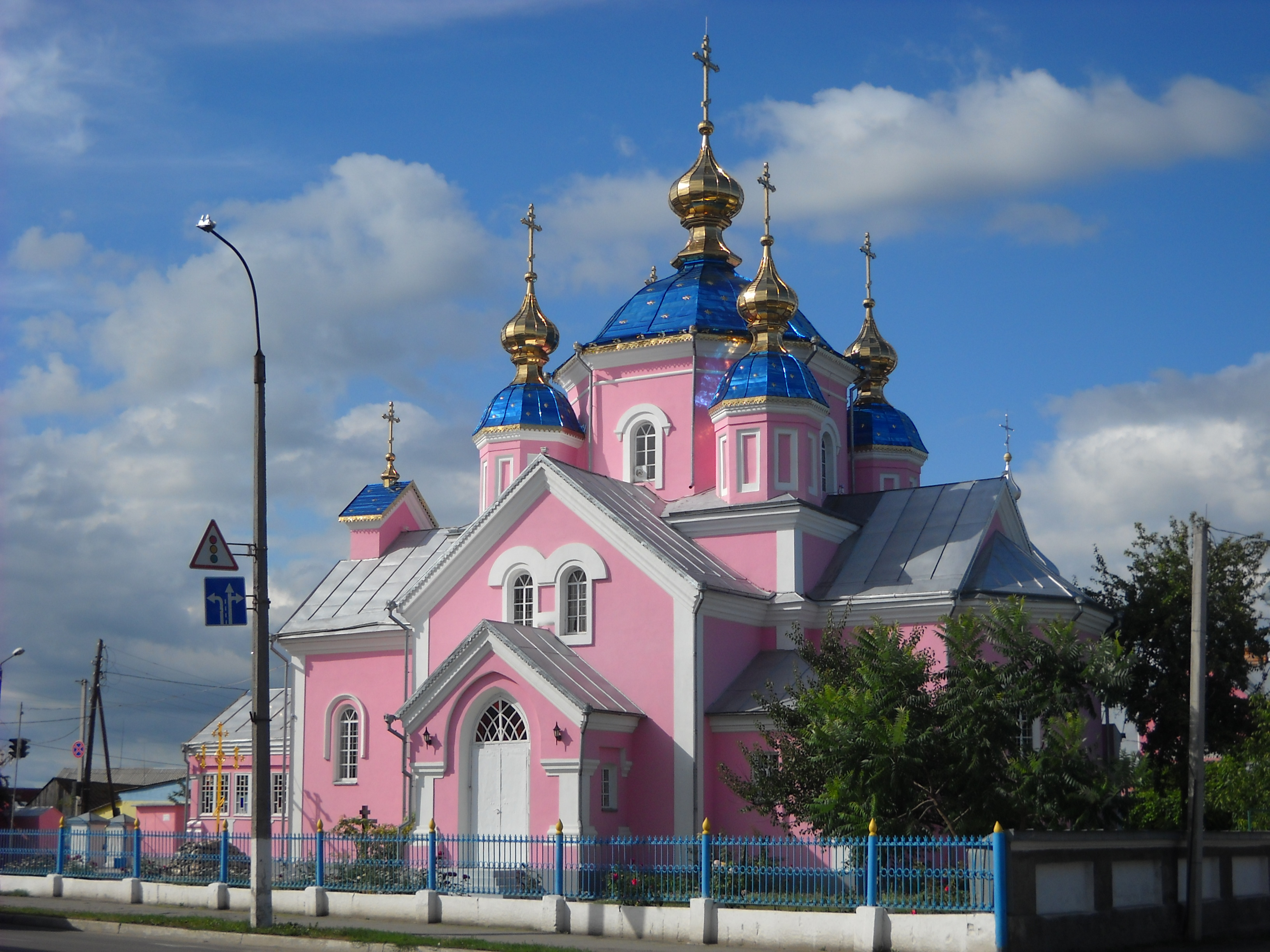
- Top: former pharmacy and former administrative building; bottom right: Cathedral of Holy Resurrection; bottom left: former hotel

- Flag Coat of arms
- Interactive map of Kovel
- Location within Volyn Oblast Location within Ukraine
- Coordinates: 51°13′0″N 24°43′0″E
- Country: Ukraine
- Oblast: Volyn Oblast
- Raion: Kovel Raion
- Hromada: Kovel urban hromada
- Founded: 13th century
- Magdeburg law: 1518

Government
  - Mayor: Ihor Chayka

Area
  - Total: 47.3 km^{2} (18.3 sq mi)

Population (2022)
  - Total: 67,575
  - Density: 1,400/km^{2} (3,600/sq mi)
- Time zone: UTC+2 (EET)
  - Summer (DST): UTC+3 (EEST)
- Postal code: 45000
- Area code: +380 3352
- Website: kovel.osp-ua.info (in Ukrainian)

Kovel (Ukrainian: Ковель, IPA: [ˈkɔwelʲ]; Polish: Kowel; Yiddish: קאוולע / קאוולי) is a city in Volyn Oblast, northwestern Ukraine. It serves as the administrative center of Kovel Raion within the oblast. Population: 67,575 (2022 estimate). The Chełm–Kovel railway (both 1435 mm and 1520 mm gauge) links the city to Chełm in Poland, and represents the longest standard-gauge railway connecting Ukraine to the rest of Europe.

Kovel gives its name to one of the oldest runic inscriptions which were lost during World War II. The Kovel spearhead, unearthed near the town in 1858, contained text in Gothic.

== History ==
The name Kovel comes from a Slavonic word for blacksmith hence the horseshoe on the town's coat of arms. The rune-inscribed Spearhead of Kovel was found near Kovel in 1858. It dates to the early 3rd century, when Gothic tribes lived in the area.

Kovel (Kowel) was first mentioned in 1310. It received its town charter from the Polish King Sigismund I the Old in 1518. In 1547 the owner of Kowel became Bona Sforza, Polish queen. Since 1564 the starost of Kowel was Andrei Kurbski (d. 1584). From 1566 to 1795 it was part of the Volhynian Voivodeship and a royal city of Poland. Starting from 1611, the city government was headed by the landvogt (lentviyt) appointed from the members of local Catholic and Ruthenian communities. In 1792 the 3rd Polish Vanguard Regiment was garrisoned in Kowel, and later on also the 2nd Polish National Cavalry Brigade was stationed there.

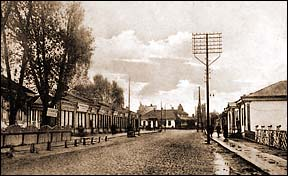
Kowel, Second Polish Republic ca. 1918.

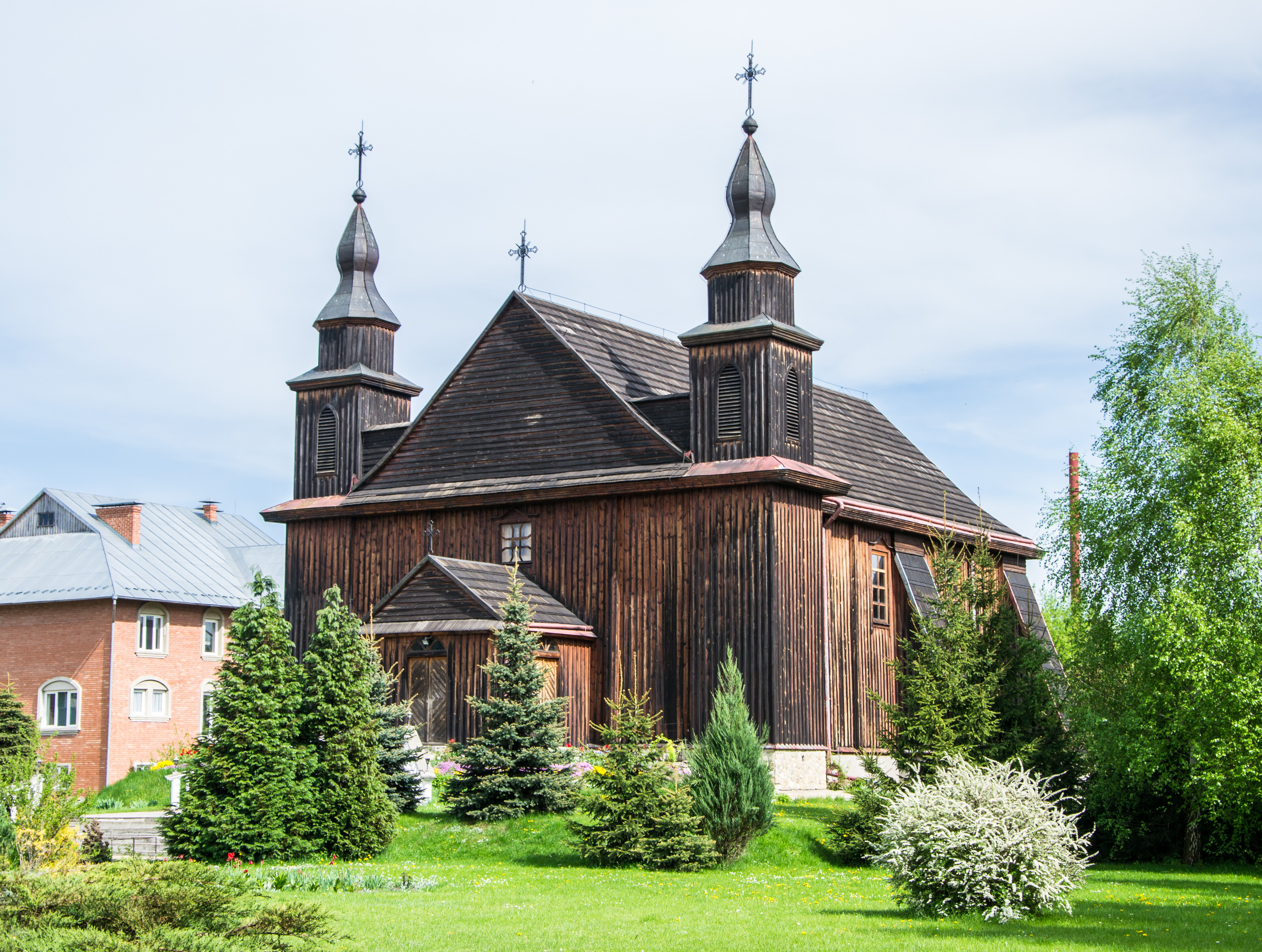
St. Anne's Church

After the Third Partition of Poland, in 1795, the town fell into the Russian Empire for over a hundred years. During that time it served as a district centre. During the First World War, the city was a site of the Battle of Kowel between the Central Powers and the Russian Empire. In summer of 1919 the city was fought over by Poles and Volhynian Division of the Ukrainian People's Republic.

During the Polish–Soviet War, on September 12, 1920, it was the site of a battle between the Poles and Russians. The Poles won the battle, capturing a large amount of weapons and military equipment, including two armored trains and 26 cannons. In the interwar period, Kowel served as the capital of Kowel County in Wołyń Voivodeship of the Polish Republic. It was an important garrison of the Polish Army, here the headquarters of the 27th Volhynian Infantry Division was located. Furthermore, at the village of Czerkasy, a large depot of the Polish Army was located. In 1924, construction of the St. Stanislaus Bishop and Martyr Roman Catholic church began.

In World War II, following the joint Nazi German-Soviet invasion of Poland in 1939, Kovel was occupied by the Soviet Union and had a large number of Jewish refugees from German-occupied Poland. The area had a large presence of the Communist Party of Western Ukraine, and thus the Red Army was generally greeted as liberators. Subsequently, in 1941 Operation Barbarossa the Germans having conquered the town on 28 June 1941 murdered 18,000 Jews in Kovel, mostly during August and September 1942. The Germans operated the Stalag 301 POW camp, a subcamp of the Stalag 360 POW camp and a Dulag transit POW camp in the town.

About 8,000 Jews were murdered in the forest near Bakhiv on 19 August 1942 during the liquidation of the Kovel ghetto, established on 25 May 1942. Jewish victims were driven by train from Kovel to Bakhiv where pits were dug close to the railroads. Actually there were two ghettos, one within the city and another in the suburbs of Pyaski. Both ghettos had 24,000 Jews, including many refugees. The Jews from both ghettos were executed at different places and at different time. The Jewish community ceased to exist.

In March and April 1944 during the Soviet Polesskoe offensive, Kovel was a site of fierce fighting between the 5th SS Panzer Division Wiking and the Red Army. Major landmarks of the city, including the wooden Annunciation Cathedral from 1505 and the railway station built by Oleksandr Verbytskyi, were destroyed during the war.

During the massacres of Poles in Volhynia and Eastern Galicia, the town was a shelter for ethnic Poles, escaping the massacres. In that period, Ukrainian nationalists murdered approximately 3,700 Polish inhabitants of Kovel county. In early spring 1944, the 27th Infantry Division of the Home Army operated in the area. Kovel was captured by the Red Army on 6 July 1944. In 1945, the Big Three, Great Britain, the United States and the Soviet Union, established new borders for Poland; the Polish population was forcibly resettled and Kovel was incorporated into the Ukrainian Soviet Socialist Republic. In 1956 the city had around 23,000 inhabitants.

Kovel has been a part of independent Ukraine since 1991. In October 2022, the city of Chamblee, Georgia, signed a Partnership Agreement with the Ukrainian city of Kovel, in Volyn Oblast. Kovel, Ukraine, became Chamblee's first sister city. That same month, Chamblee Mayor Brian Mock personally visited Kovel, Ukraine.

== Geography ==
=== Location ===
Kovel lies above the Turiya river in the historical region of Volhynian Polesia.

=== Climate ===
Climate data for Kovel (1991–2020)
Month	Jan	Feb	Mar	Apr	May	Jun	Jul	Aug	Sep	Oct	Nov	Dec	Year
Mean daily maximum °C (°F)	0.2 (32.4)	2.0 (35.6)	7.3 (45.1)	15.0 (59.0)	20.8 (69.4)	24.1 (75.4)	26.0 (78.8)	25.5 (77.9)	19.6 (67.3)	13.2 (55.8)	6.4 (43.5)	1.5 (34.7)	13.5 (56.3)
Daily mean °C (°F)	−2.4 (27.7)	−1.4 (29.5)	2.7 (36.9)	9.1 (48.4)	14.4 (57.9)	17.9 (64.2)	19.7 (67.5)	18.8 (65.8)	13.6 (56.5)	8.2 (46.8)	3.2 (37.8)	−1.0 (30.2)	8.6 (47.5)
Mean daily minimum °C (°F)	−5.0 (23.0)	−4.3 (24.3)	−1.2 (29.8)	4.9 (40.8)	8.7 (47.7)	12.3 (54.1)	14.2 (57.6)	13.1 (55.6)	8.7 (47.7)	4.2 (39.6)	0.6 (33.1)	−3.1 (26.4)	4.4 (39.9)
Average precipitation mm (inches)	36 (1.4)	35 (1.4)	39 (1.5)	41 (1.6)	68 (2.7)	80 (3.1)	88 (3.5)	61 (2.4)	63 (2.5)	44 (1.7)	40 (1.6)	42 (1.7)	637 (25.1)
Average precipitation days (≥ 1.0 mm)	9.2	9.2	9.1	8.2	9.5	9.6	9.9	7.6	8.1	8.1	9.4	9.9	107.8
Average relative humidity (%)	85.8	83.0	76.1	68.4	69.8	71.9	73.8	73.9	80.1	82.6	87.0	87.7	78.3
Mean monthly sunshine hours	43	66	136	197	254	268	272	263	172	119	50	32	1,872
Source: NOAA

== Demographics ==
As of the 2001 Ukrainian census, Kovel had a population of 65,777 inhabitants. The ethnic and linguitic composition of the population at the time of the census was as follows:

Ethnic groups in Kovel
	percent
Ukrainians	95.42%
Russians	3.65%
Belarusians	0.48%
Poles	0.09%
Armenians	0.06%
Germans	0.04%
others	0.26%

Native languages in Kovel
	percent
Ukrainian	95.8%
Russian	3.9%
Belarusian	0.1%
others	0.2%

== Transportation ==
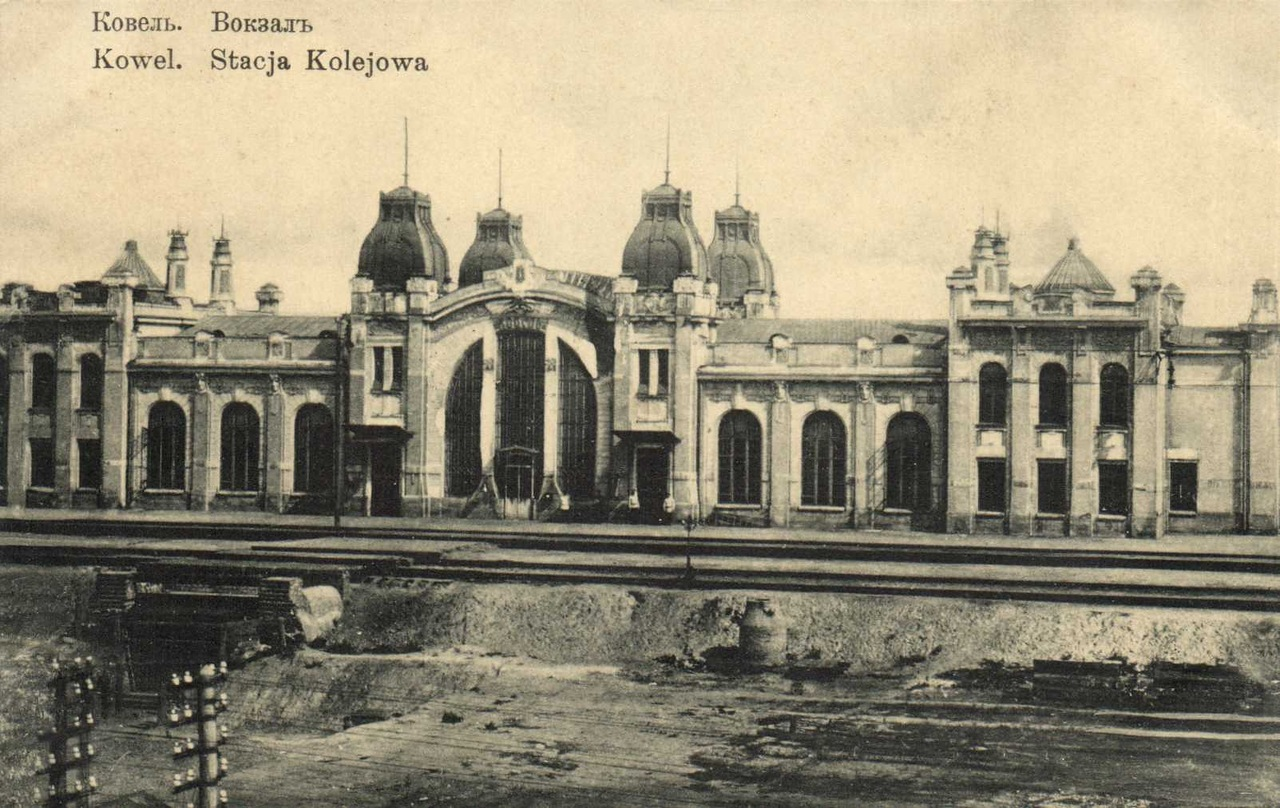
Kovel's historic railway station

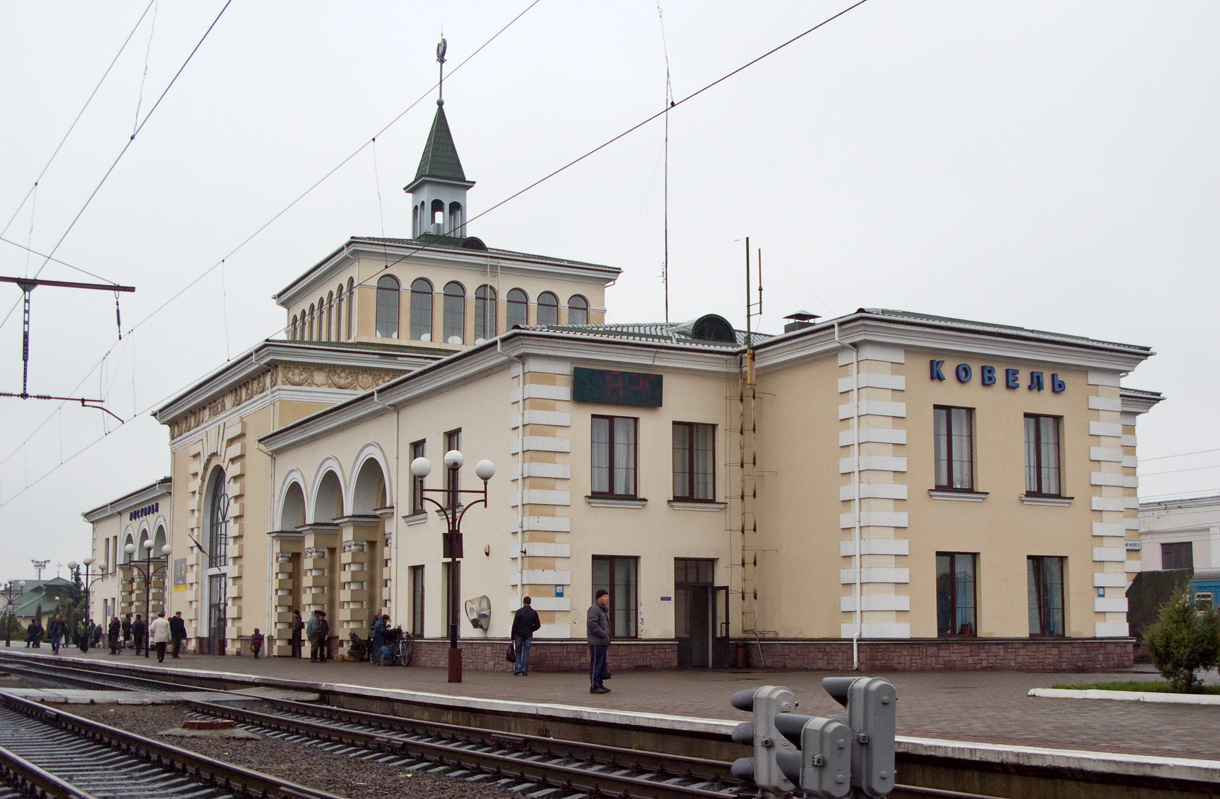
Kovel's modern railway station

Kovel is the north-western hub of the Ukrainian rail system, with six rail lines radiating outward from the city. The first of these was built in 1873, connecting the city with Brest-Litovsk and Rivne. In 1877 Kovel was linked by the Vistula River Railroad with Lublin and Warsaw.

== Notable people ==
- Meir Auerbach (1815–1877), first Ashkenazi Chief Rabbi of Jerusalem
- Lesya Ukrainka (1871–1913), Ukrainian poet
- Israel Friedlander (1876–1920), rabbi, educator, and biblical scholar
- Frieda Hennock (1904–1960), first female commissioner of the Federal Communications Commission
- Michał Waszyński (1904–1965), film director and producer
- Abraham Zapruder (1905–1970), clothing manufacturer who filmed the assassination of John F. Kennedy
- Kazimierz Dejmek (1924–2002), Polish actor and theatre and film director, and politician
- Ryszard Horodecki (born 1943), Polish physicist and professor of University of Gdańsk
- Serhiy Chapko (born 1988), professional footballer

== Twin towns – sister cities ==
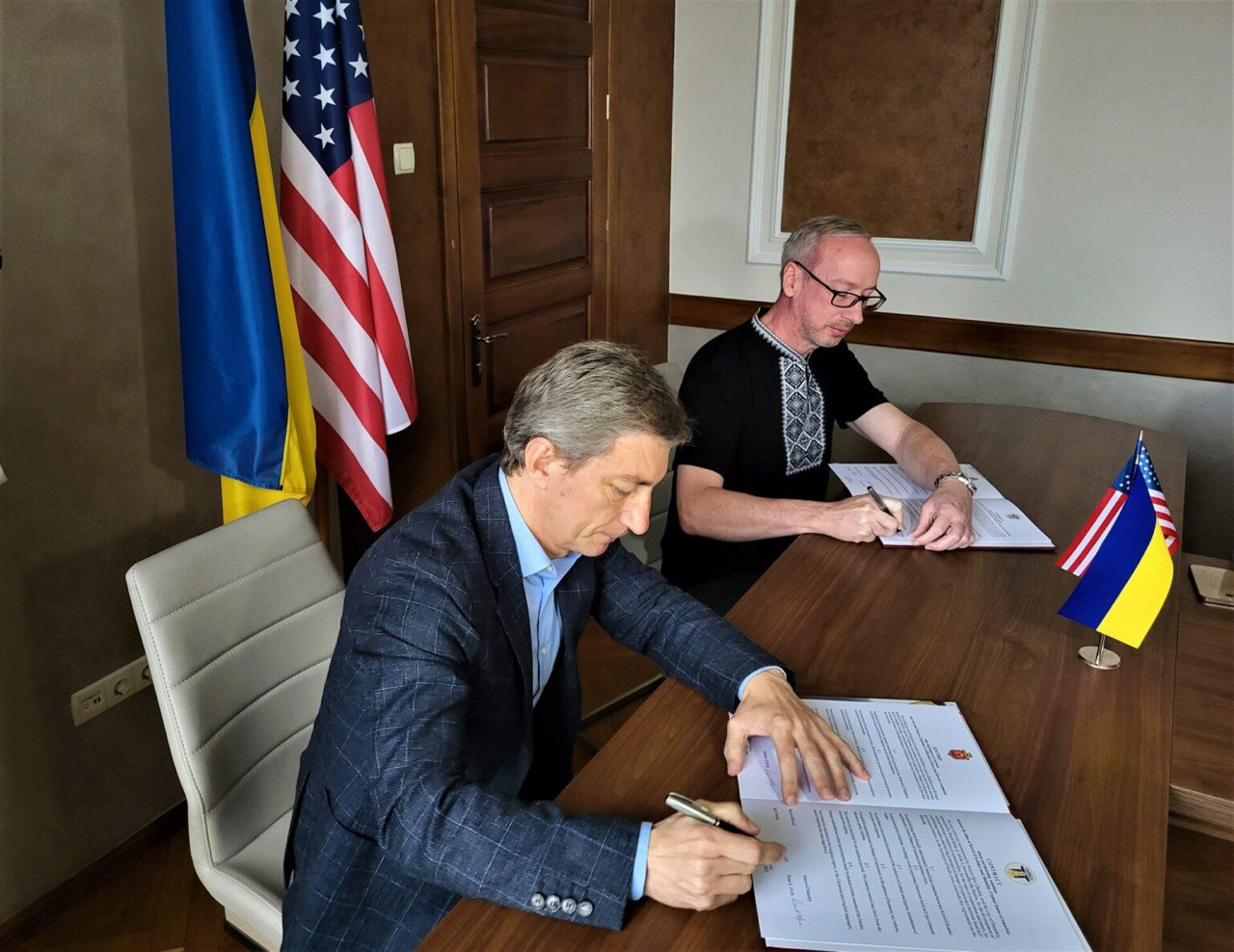
Kovel Mayor Ihor Chaika and Chamblee Mayor Brian Mock sign the Sister City Agreement. October 2022, Kovel, Ukraine

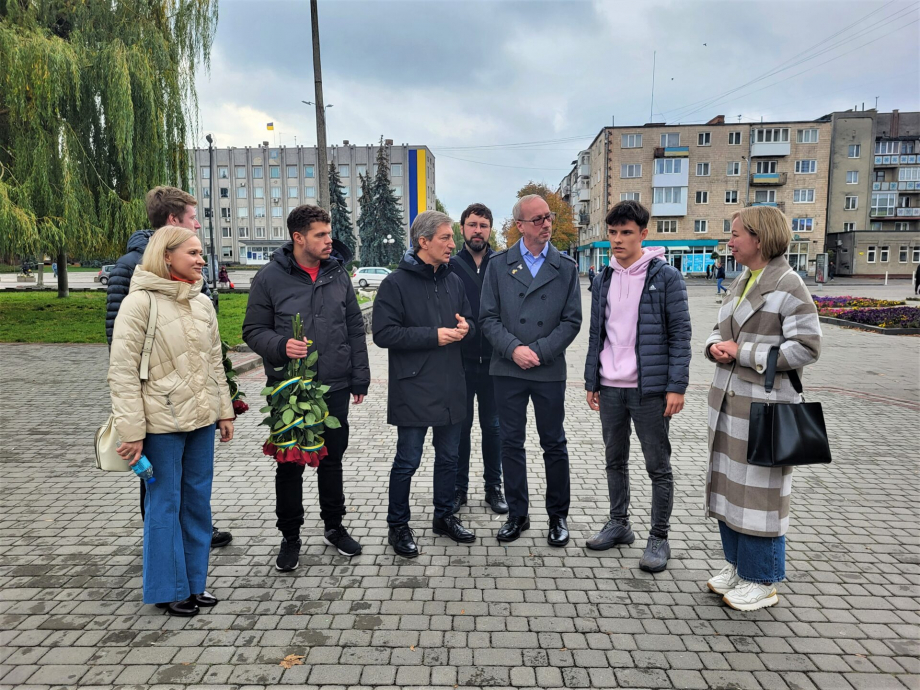
Chamblee Mayor Brian Mock, Kovel Mayor Ihor Chaika, the NGO "Big Idea" - Lyudmila Zubareva, Pavlo Oksenyuk, Rafael Crepaldi strolling through Kovel, Ukraine.

Kovel is twinned with:

- Chamblee, United States
- Baboszewo, Poland
- Barsinghausen, Germany
- Brzeg Dolny, Poland
- Bucha, Ukraine
- Chełm, Poland
- Łęczna, Poland
- Legionowo, Poland
- Nikolske, Ukraine
- Shchuchyn, Belarus
- Smila, Ukraine
- Szczuczyn, Poland
- Utena, Lithuania
- Walsrode, Germany
