= Novovolynsk =

City in Volyn Oblast, Ukraine

Novovolynsk Нововолинськ
- City
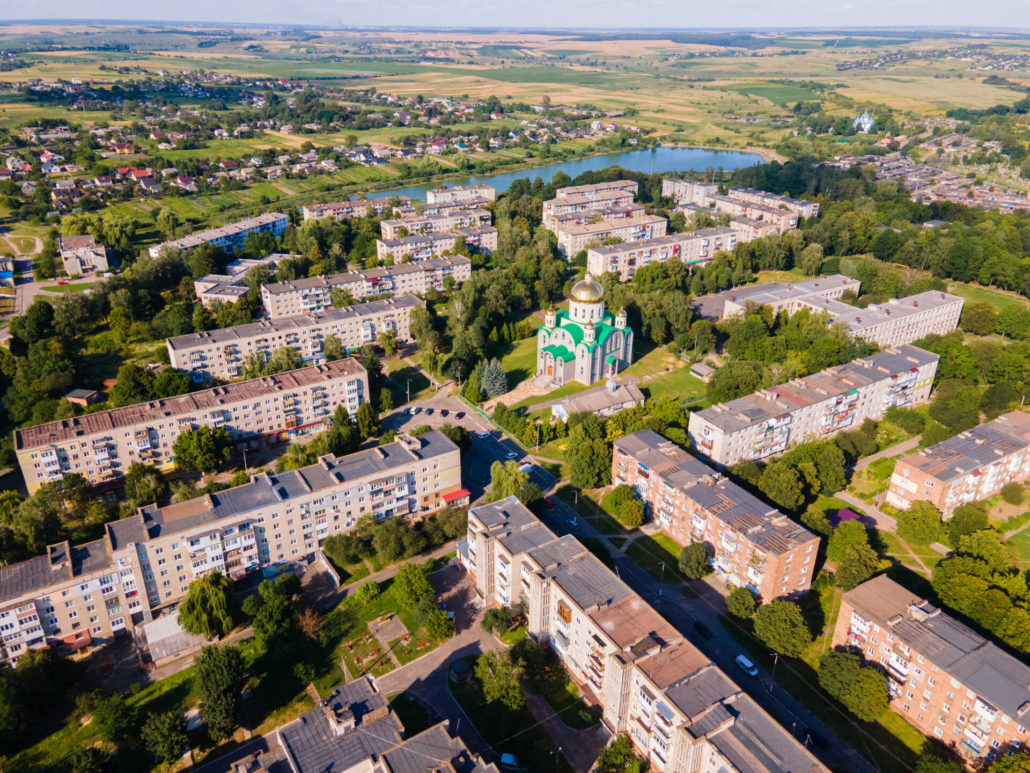
- Novovolynsk from above

- Flag Coat of arms

- Location within Volyn Oblast Location within Ukraine
- Coordinates: 50°44′00″N 24°10′00″E
- Country: Ukraine
- Oblast: Volyn Oblast
- Raion: Volodymyr Raion
- Hromada: Novovolynsk urban hromada
- Founded: 1951
- City status: 1957

Government
  - Mayor: Borys Karpus

Area
  - Total: 17 km^{2} (6.6 sq mi)

Population (2022)
  - Total: ▲49,772
- Postal code: 45400
- Area code: +380-3344
- Website: nov-rada.gov.ua

Novovolynsk (Ukrainian: Нововолинськ, IPA: [nowowoˈlɪnsʲk]) is a city in Volyn Oblast, Ukraine. Novovolynsk, together with the rural settlement of Blahodatne and six villages, is incorporated into Novovolynsk urban hromada. Population: 49,772 (2022 estimate).

Located within the Lviv-Volyn coal basin until recently, Novovolynsk was a major coal mining center of the region. The city has a few factories: a ferroconcrete plant, brickworks, a plant for mining equipment maintenance, a meatpacking and bread factory, and a woodworking plant.

== History ==
Novovolynsk was built in 1950 as a mining town in the USSR. It obtained city status in 1957. The word "Novovolynsk" is a morphological blend, meaning "a new town in the Volyn Oblast".

There is a monument to a Ukrainian poet and artist Taras Shevchenko in Novovolynsk.

== Geography ==
Novovolynsk is situated in the southwest of Volyn Oblast in the far north-west of Ukraine. The city area is about 17 square kilometers. The state border to Poland runs 15 km to the West from the city; 92 km to the North from Novovolynsk there is the state border to Belarus.

The city is well-situated. The distance to the national highway H22 Ustyluh – Lutsk – Rivne is only 18 km. The distance to the international highway E373 (coincides with national M07) Warsaw – Lublin – Kovel – Sarny – Korosten – Kyiv is only 76 km.

== Demographics ==
As of the 2001 Ukrainian census, Novovolynsk had a population of 58,558 inhabitants. The ethnic and linguitic composition of the population at the time of the census was as follows:

Ethnic groups in Novovolynsk
	percent
Ukrainians	93.75%
Russians	4.99%
Belarusians	0.69%
Poles	0.14%
Armenians	0.05%
Tatars	0.05%
Germans	0.04%
Georgians	0.04%
others	0.25%

Native languages in Novovolynsk
	percent
Ukrainian	94.5%
Russian	5.1%
Belarusian	0.2%
others	0.2%

== Notable people ==
- Artem Fedetskyi (born 1985), footballer

== Twin towns – sister cities ==
Novovolynsk is twinned with:

- Biłgoraj, Poland
- Bílina, Czech Republic
- Hrubieszów County, Poland
- Jaraczewo, Poland
- Kelmė, Lithuania
- Otwock County, Poland
- Rymanów, Poland
- Stropkov, Slovakia
- Edegem, Belgium

== Gallery ==
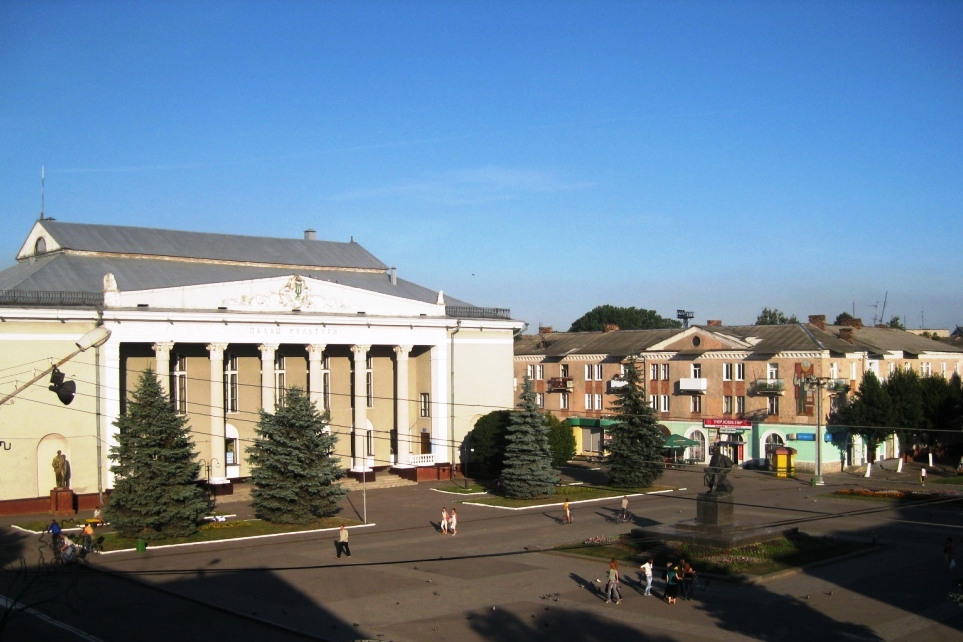
Central square

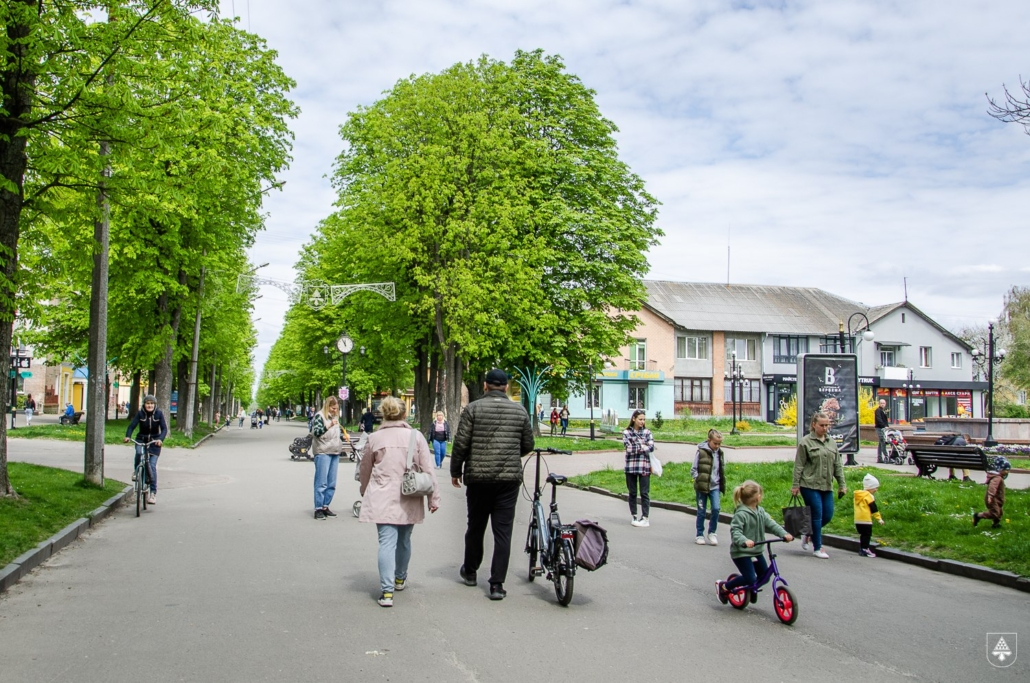

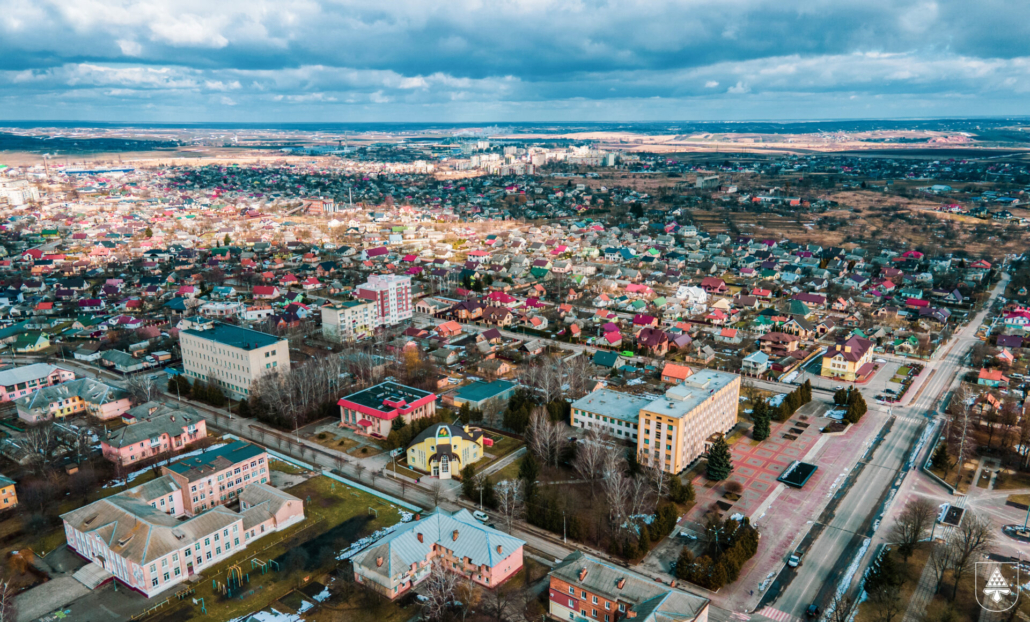

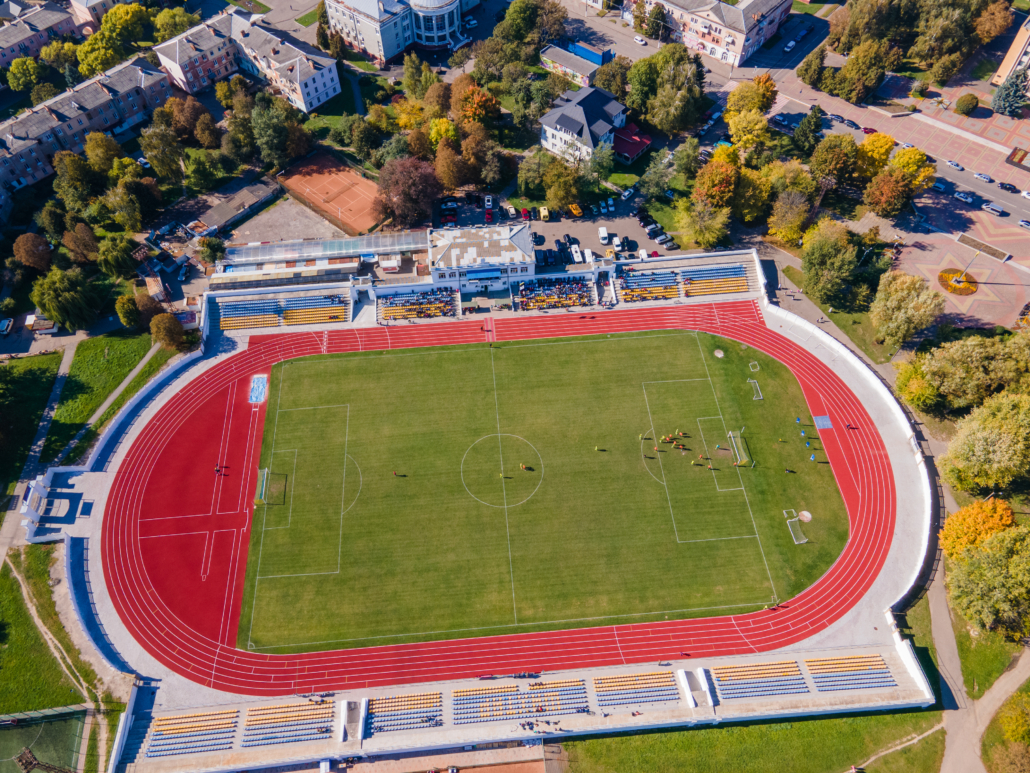
Stadium

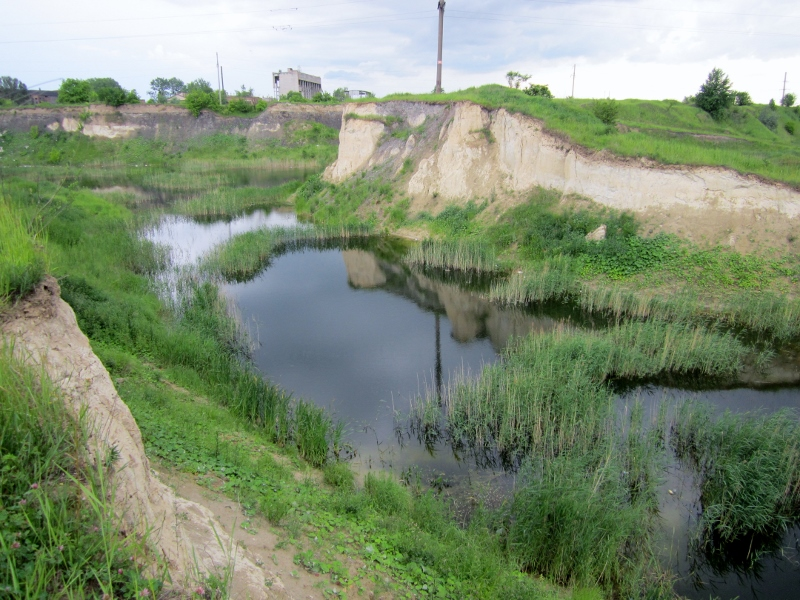
Old clay quarry

== Sources ==
- Олександр Цинкаловський. Стара Волинь і Волинське Полісся. Краєзнавчий словник — від найдавніших часів до 1914 року. – V. 1. (in Ukrainian)
