= Volodymyr Raion =

Subdivision of Volyn Oblast, Ukraine

Volodymyr Raion Володимирський район
- Raion
- Flag Coat of arms

- Coordinates: 50°51′00″N 24°12′00″E
- Country: Ukraine
- Oblast: Volyn Oblast
- Established: 1940
- Admin. center: Volodymyr
- Subdivisions: 11 hromadas

Area
  - Total: 2,558.2 km^{2} (987.7 sq mi)

Population (2022)
  - Total: 169,231
  - Density: 66.152/km^{2} (171.33/sq mi)
- Time zone: UTC+02:00 (EET)
  - Summer (DST): UTC+03:00 (EEST)
- Area code: 380-3342
- Website: Volodymyrskyi Raion

Volodymyr Raion (Ukrainian: Володимирський район, romanized: Volodymyrs'kyj rajon) is a raion (district) in Volyn Oblast in western Ukraine. Its administrative center is the city of Volodymyr. Population: 169,231 (2022).

On 18 July 2020, as part of the administrative reform of Ukraine, the number of raions of Volyn Oblast was reduced to four, and the area of Volodymyr-Volynskyi Raion was significantly expanded. The January 2020 estimate of the raion population was 24,545 (2020). On 18 July 2022 raion was renamed to Volodymyr Raion.

== Geography ==
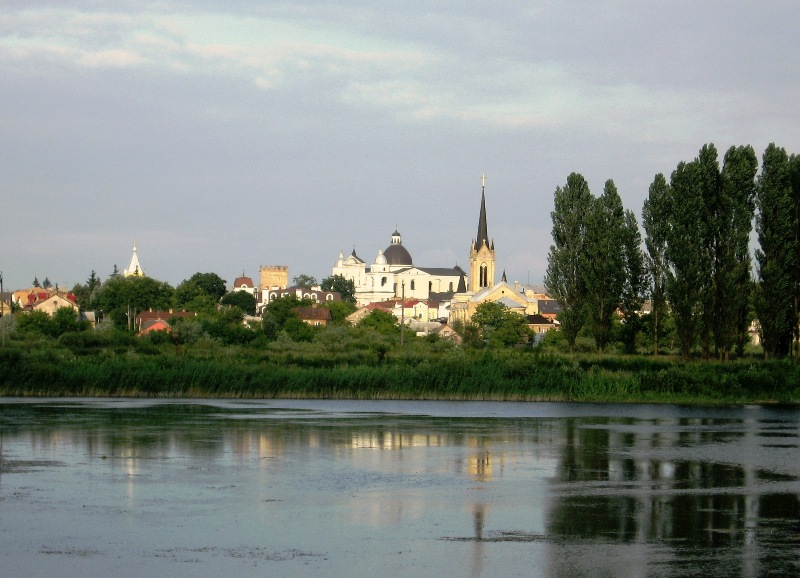
Lutsk old town and the Styr

The area of the district is 2556.5 km^{2}.

The district borders the Lutsk Raion and Kovelskyi Raion of the Volyn Oblast, as well as the Lviv Oblast of Ukraine and the Poland . The larger area of the district is located in the Volhynian Upland . The area of the area is located in the area of mixed forests and the river basin Luha (tributary of the Bug). The climate is moderately continental with mild winters (in January -4.4 °, -5.1 °) and warm wet summer (in July +18.8 °). Rainfall 550-640 mm per year.

== Communities of the district ==
Number of settlements 201. Number of cities – 3. The district includes 11 territorial communities. Urban communities are formed around the cities of Ustyluh, Volodymyr, Novovolynsk. 8 rural communities with centers in the Ivanychi village, Lokachi village, Zymne village, Ovadne village, Lytovezh village, Pavlivka village, Poromiv village, Zaturtsi village.

== Economy of the district ==
The area of agricultural land in the district is 55.67 thousand hectares. Crop production accounts for 97% of the agricultural production structure.The district grows grain and industrial crops, mainly wheat, rapeseed, and sugar beet. The largest industrial center in the district is the city of Volodymyr, where enterprises of the woodworking, furniture, light, food, and construction industries operate.

== Transport ==
The national highways of Ukraine pass through Volodymyr district: H-22, the route Ustylug - Lutsk - Rivne.The Kovel-Lviv railway passes through Volodymyr.

== Conservation ==
In the district, in 2000, the Luga local hydrological reserve was established along the Luga River. The territory of the reserve covers the Luga River and the coastal part of its floodplain with old growth forests and marshes. The reserve is a nesting place for birds, in particular the Eurasian curlew - a species listed on the IUCN Red List and the European Red List.

== See also ==
- Administrative divisions of Volyn Oblast
