= Dereviane =

Dereviane (Ukrainian: Дерев'яне) may refer to the following places in Ukraine:

- Dereviane, village in Kamianets-Podilskyi Raion, Khmelnytskyi Oblast
- Dereviane, village in Rivne Raion, Rivne Oblast
