= Kytaihorod =

Village in Khmelnytskyi Oblast, Ukraine

Kytaihorod Китайгород
- Village
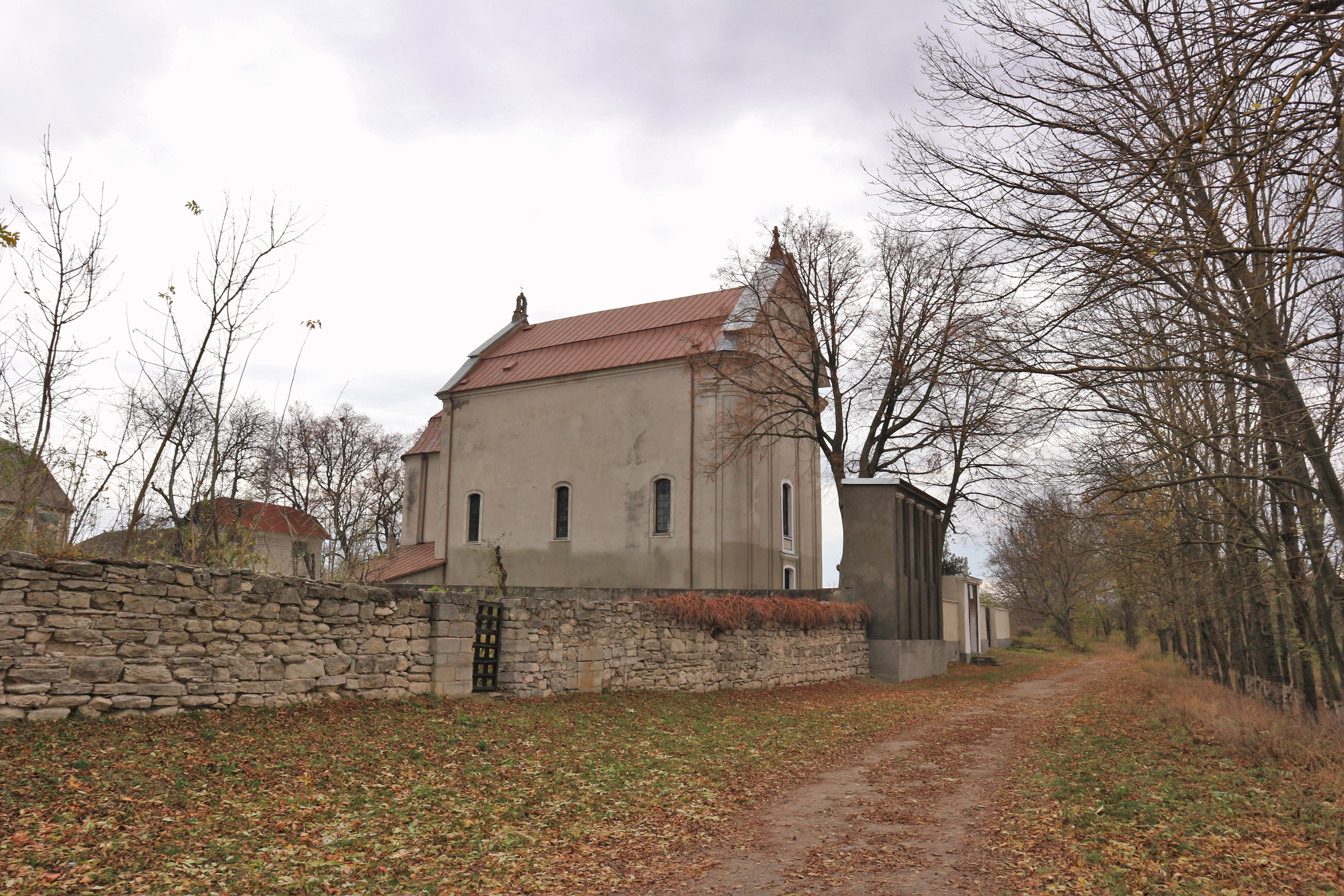
- Roman Catholic Church of Virgin Mary

- Location within Ukraine Location within Khmelnytskyi Oblast
- Coordinates: 48°38′44″N 26°47′51″E
- Country: Ukraine
- Oblast: Khmelnytskyi Oblast
- Raion: Kamianets-Podilskyi Raion
- Hromada: Kytaihorod rural hromada
- Established: 1607

Area
  - Land: 1,341 km^{2} (518 sq mi)

Population (2001)
  - Total: 480
- Postal code: 32392

Kytaihorod (Ukrainian: Китайгород) is a village in Kamianets-Podilskyi Raion, Khmelnytskyi Oblast in Ukraine. It serves as the centre of Kytaihorod rural hromada. Located in the historical region of Podolia, Kytaihorod stands on the Ternava river near its confluence with the Dniester. Kytaihorod is a popular tourist destination due to its unique natural landscape and rich historical heritage.

== History ==
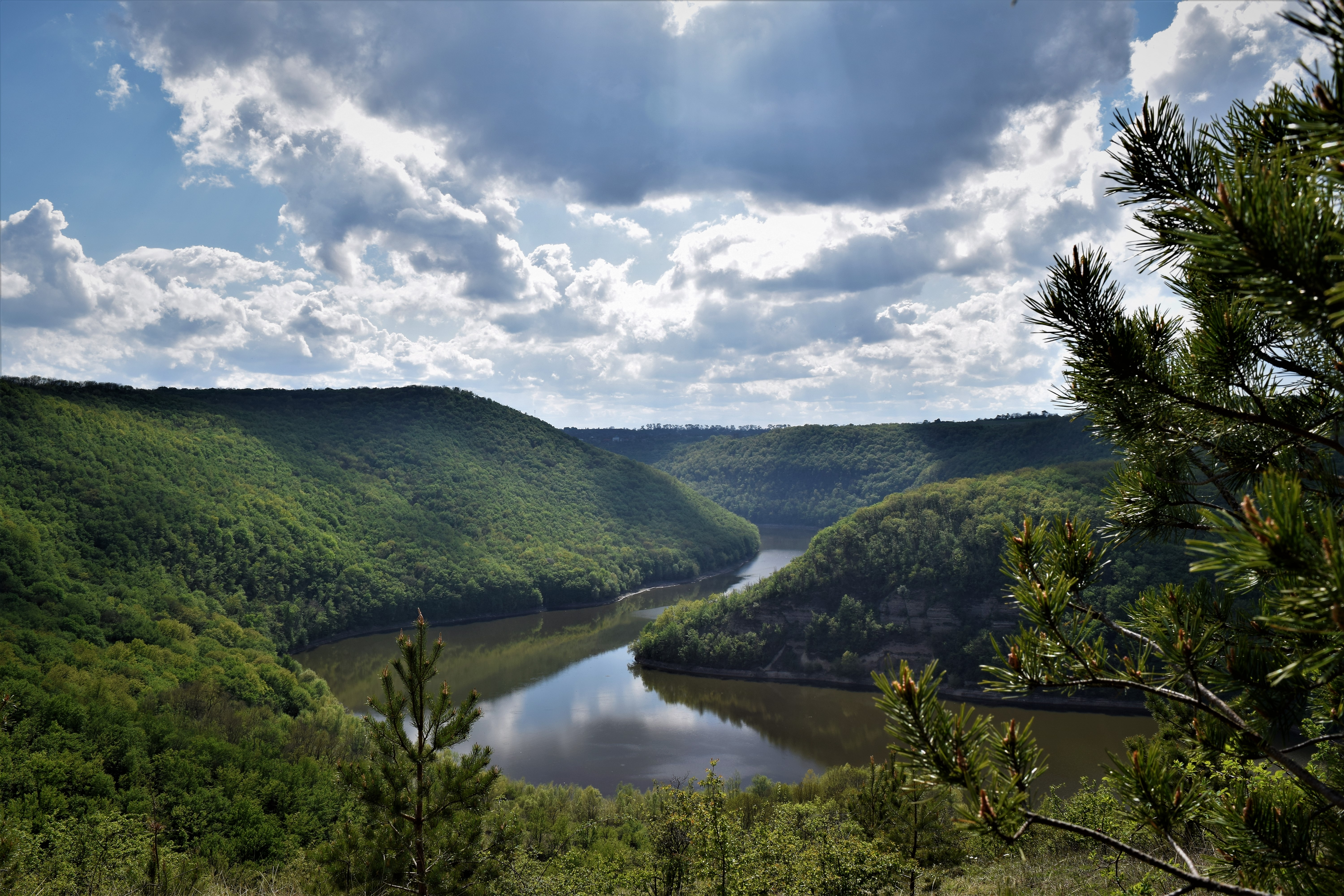
Ternava river in the vicinity of Kytaihorod

During the 2nd and 3rd centuries AD the area of Kytaihorod was settled by tribes of Cherniakhiv culture, who engaged in trade with the Roman Empire. The name of the settlement derives from the old Slavic term for enclosed territory and has the same root as the Kitay-Gorod area in Moscow.

Kytaihorod was established around 1607 by Kamianets castellan Andrzej Potocki. His son, Crown Hetman Stanisław "Rewera" Potocki built a castle and fortified the settlement. In 1703 a wooden Orthodox church was established. Later the town was inherited by the Popowski family, which built their palace here during the early 19th century. The Orthodox church was replaced by a new church built in Russian Revival style in 1872-1876, and in 1882 the original building was disassembled and sold to a nearby village.

The local Roman Catholic church was established in the 18th century and also served as a fortification against Turkish attacks. It remained one of the few Catholic sanctuaries which continued their operations under the Soviet rule following World War II, attracting numerous faithful from the surrounding areas.

== Points of interest ==
The village lies in the Tovtry geographical area and is located on the edge of a canyon of Ternava river, which contains sediments from Devonian and Silurian periods, making it a unique geological object in Europe.
