= Kolodiivka =

Kolodiivka is a Ukrainian place name which can refer to the following villages:

- Kolodiivka, Ivano-Frankivsk Oblast, formerly known in Polish as Kołodziejówka
- Kolodiivka, Khmelnytskyi Oblast
- Kolodiivka, Rivne Oblast
- Kolodiivka, Ternopil Oblast
- Kolodiivka, Zhytomyr Oblast
