= Zoria rural hromada =

Municipality in Rivne Oblast, Ukraine

Zoria rural hromada Зорянська сільська громада
- Hromada
- Interactive map of Zoria rural hromada
- Country: Ukraine
- Oblast (province): Rivne Oblast
- Raion (district): Rivne Raion
- Administrative center: Zoria

Area
  - Total: 193.4 km^{2} (74.7 sq mi)

Population
  - Total: 12,171
  - Density: 62.93/km^{2} (163.0/sq mi)

Zoria rural territorial hromada (Ukrainian: Зорянська сільська територіальна громада, romanized: Zorianska silska terytorialna hromada) is a hromada (municipality) in Rivne Raion of Rivne Oblast in western Ukraine. Its administrative centre is the village of Zoria.

== Composition ==
The hromada consists of 15 villages:

- Biliv
- Derevyane
- Dykiv
- Holyshiv
- Hrabiv
- Novostav
- Novostav-Dalnii
- Novozhukiv
- Olyshva
- Radukhivka
- Smorzhiv
- Starozhukiv
- Sukhivtsi
- Zastavya
- Zoria
