= Kytaihorod rural hromada, Khmelnytskyi Oblast =

Kytaihorod rural hromada Китайгородська сільська громада
- Hromada
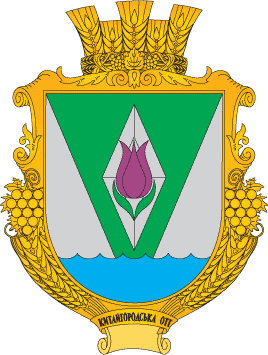
- Seal
- Interactive map of Kytaihorod rural hromada
- Country: Ukraine
- Oblast: Khmelnytskyi Oblast
- Raion: Kamianets-Podilskyi Raion
- Founded: 2015

Area
  - Total: 186.7 km^{2} (72.1 sq mi)

Population
  - Total: 5,202
- Website: kitaygorodska-gromada.gov.ua

Kytaihorod rural hromada (Ukrainian: Китайгородська сільська громада) is one of the hromadas of Kamianets-Podilskyi Raion in Khmelnytskyi Oblast in Ukraine. Its administrative centre is the village of Kytaihorod.

== Composition ==
The hromada encompasses 13 villages:

- Brovari
- Demshyn
- Derevyane
- Heletyna
- Kalachkivtsi
- Kolodiivka
- Kytaihorod (administrative centre)
- Lenivka
- Patryntsi
- Pryvitne
- Rohizna
- Subich
- Vykhvatnivtsi
