= Medobory Nature Reserve =

Nature reserve in Ternopil Oblast, Ukraine

- Ukrainian: Природний заповідник «Медобори»
- IUCN category Ia (strict nature reserve)
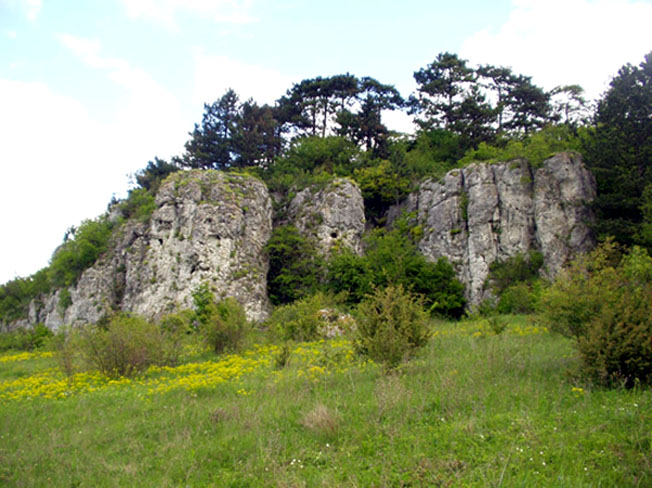
- Medobory Nature Reserve

- Location within Ukraine
- Location: Ternopil Oblast, Chortkiv Raion
- Nearest city: Hrymailiv
- Coordinates: 49°12′0″N 26°10′0″E
- Area: 10,521 hectares (25,998 acres; 105 km^{2}; 41 sq mi)
- Established: 1990
- Governing body: State Forest Resources Agency Ukraine
- Website: http://www.medobory-reserve.te.ua/

The Medobory Nature Reserve (Ukrainian: Природний заповідник «Медобори») is a protected nature reserve of Ukraine located in the Podolian Upland in the western part of the country. It protects a representative portion of the Tovtry region, known for rocky limestone ridges. The reserve is in Chortkiv and Ternopil Raions of Ternopil Oblast.

== Topography ==
The reserve occupies a section of the Tovtry region, a 200 km long limestone ridge that formed as a reef in a warm Miocene sea some 15-20 million years ago. The ridge is highly desiccated and eroded, rising 60–100 meters above the surrounding territory. The southwestern slopes of the ridge is steep, the northeastern slope gradually flattens. The highest point in the reserve is Mount Bogit (414 meters). The Zbruch River runs along the eastern edge of the reserve.

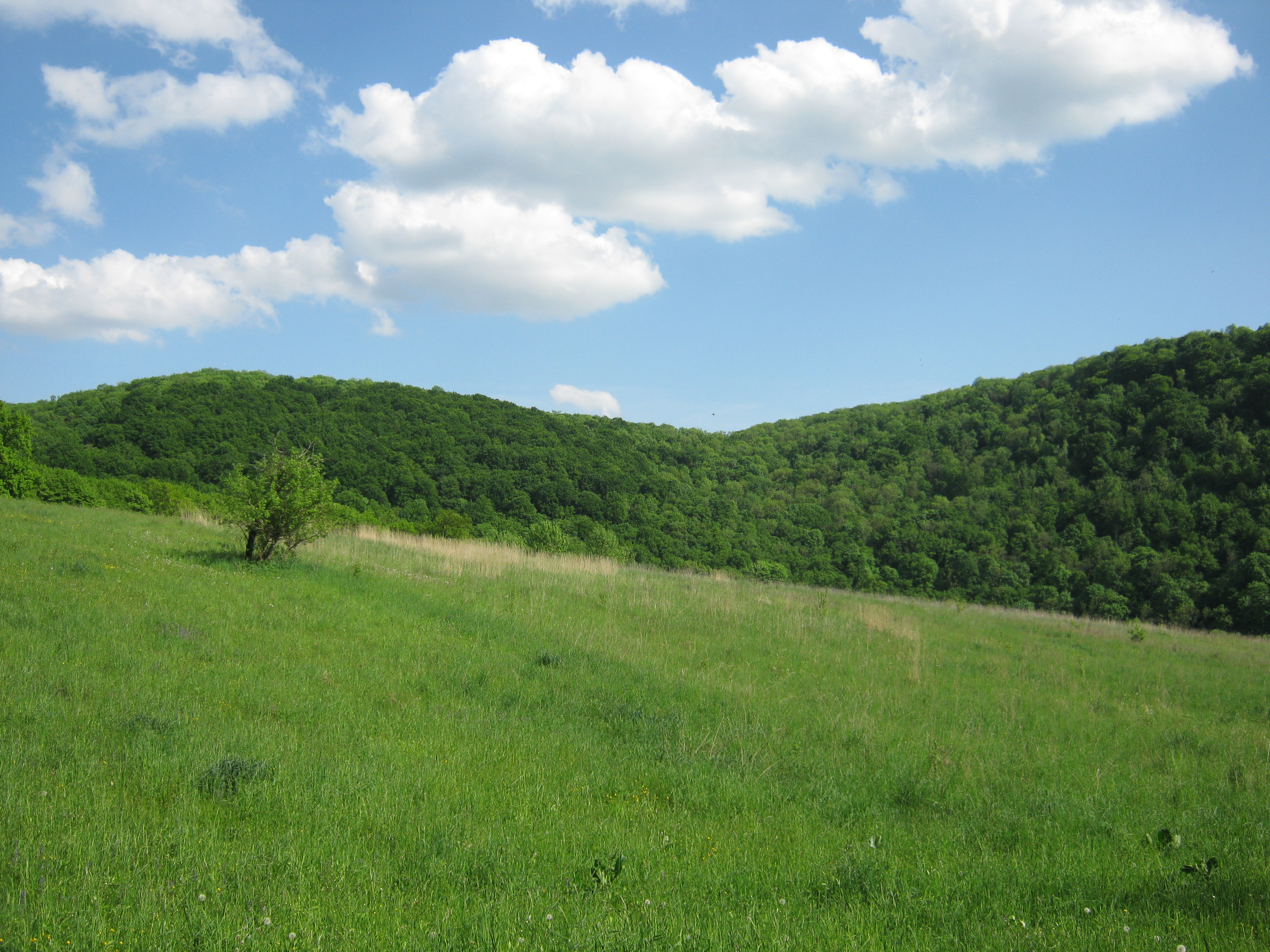
Meadow in forest, Medobory Nature Reserve

== Climate and ecoregion ==
The climate of the Medobory area is Humid continental climate, warm summer (Köppen climate classification (Dfb)). This climate is characterized by large seasonal temperature differentials and a warm summer (at least four months averaging over 10 °C (50 °F), but no month averaging over 22 °C (72 °F). In the reserve, the average temperature in January is −3 °C (27 °F) and 18 °C (64 °F) in July. Precipitation averages 620 mm/year.

Medobory is located in the Central European mixed forests ecoregion, a temperate hardwood forest covering much of northeastern Europe, from Germany to Russia.

== Flora and fauna ==
93% of the reserve is forested, mostly in oak-hornbeam, oak-hornbeam-ash, and oak-beech stands. The soils are loam and limestone, supporting a wide variety of plants. Over 1,000 species of vascular plants have been recorded in the area.

== Public use ==
As a strict nature reserve, Medobory's primary purpose is protection of nature and scientific study. Public access is limited: mass recreation and construction of facilities is prohibited, as are hunting and fishing. The public may access a limited number of ecological trail under supervision of reserve staff.

== See also ==
- Lists of Nature Preserves of Ukraine (class Ia protected areas)
- National Parks of Ukraine (class II protected areas)
