= Dereviane, Khmelnytskyi Oblast =

Village in Khmelnytskyi Oblast, Ukraine

Dereviane Дерев'яне
- Village
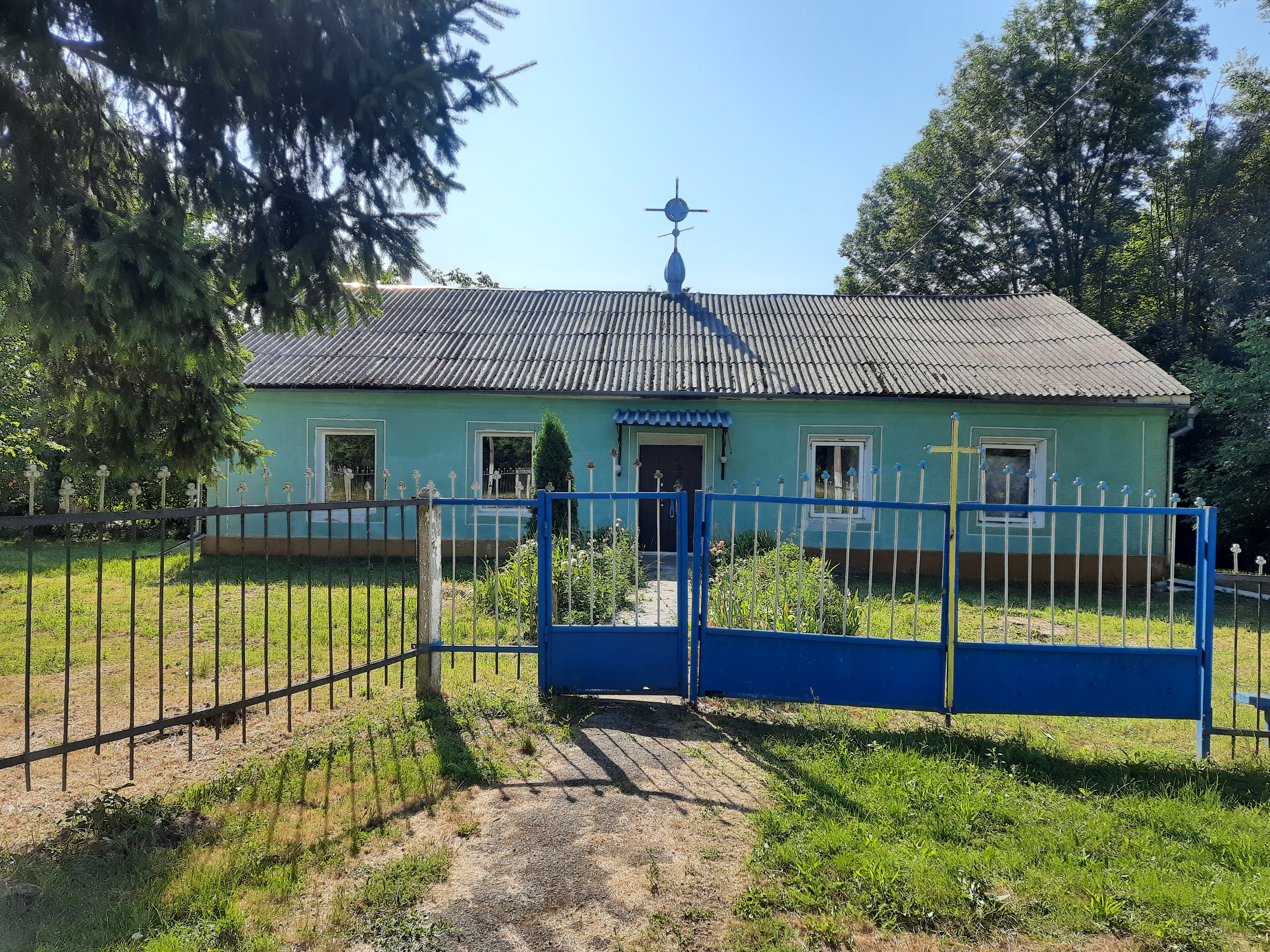

- Location of Dereviane within Khmelnytskyi Oblast Dereviane (Ukraine)
- Coordinates: 48°42′41″N 26°50′08″E
- Country: Ukraine
- Oblast: Khmelnytskyi Oblast
- Raion: Kamianets-Podilskyi Raion
- Hromada: Kytaihorod rural hromada
- Elevation: 309 m (1,014 ft)

Population (2001)
  - Total: 403
- Time zone: UTC+2 (EET)
  - Summer (DST): UTC+3 (EEST)
- Postal code: 38104
- Area code: +380 5353

Dereviane (Ukrainian: Дерев'яне) is a village in the Kamianets-Podilskyi Raion, in the Khmelnytskyi Oblast of western Ukraine. It forms part of Kytaihorod rural hromada one of the hromadas of Ukraine.

== Gallery ==
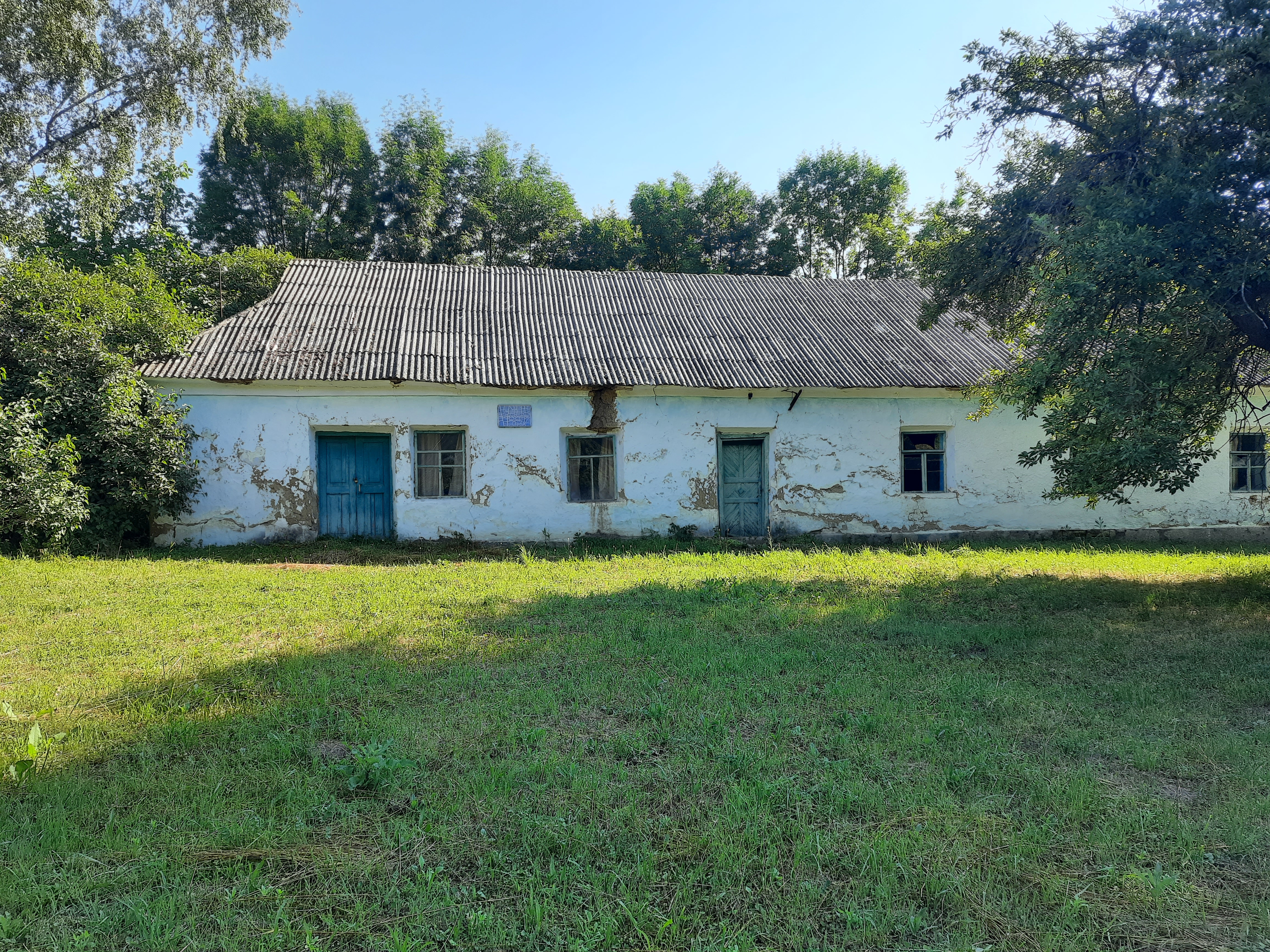

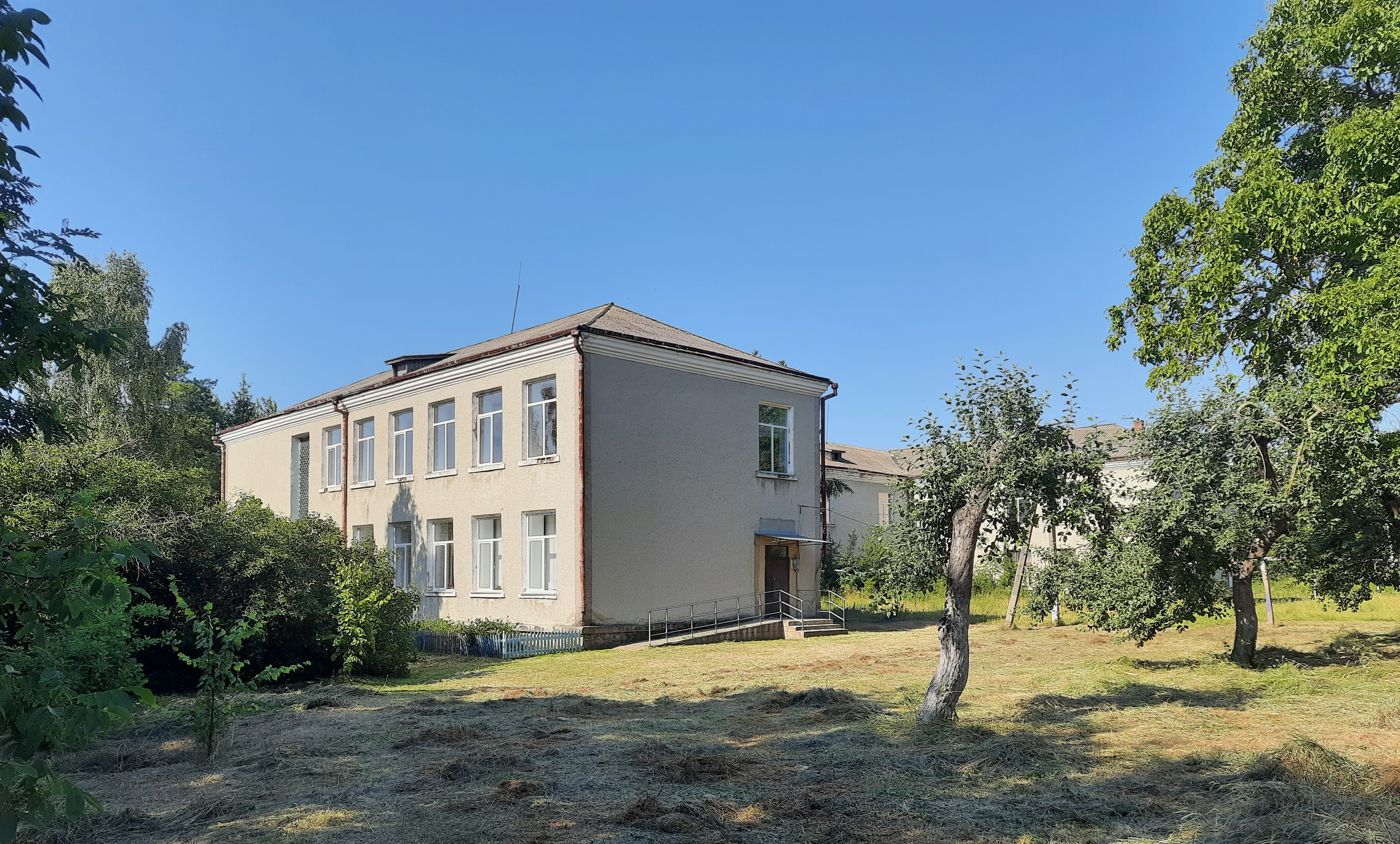

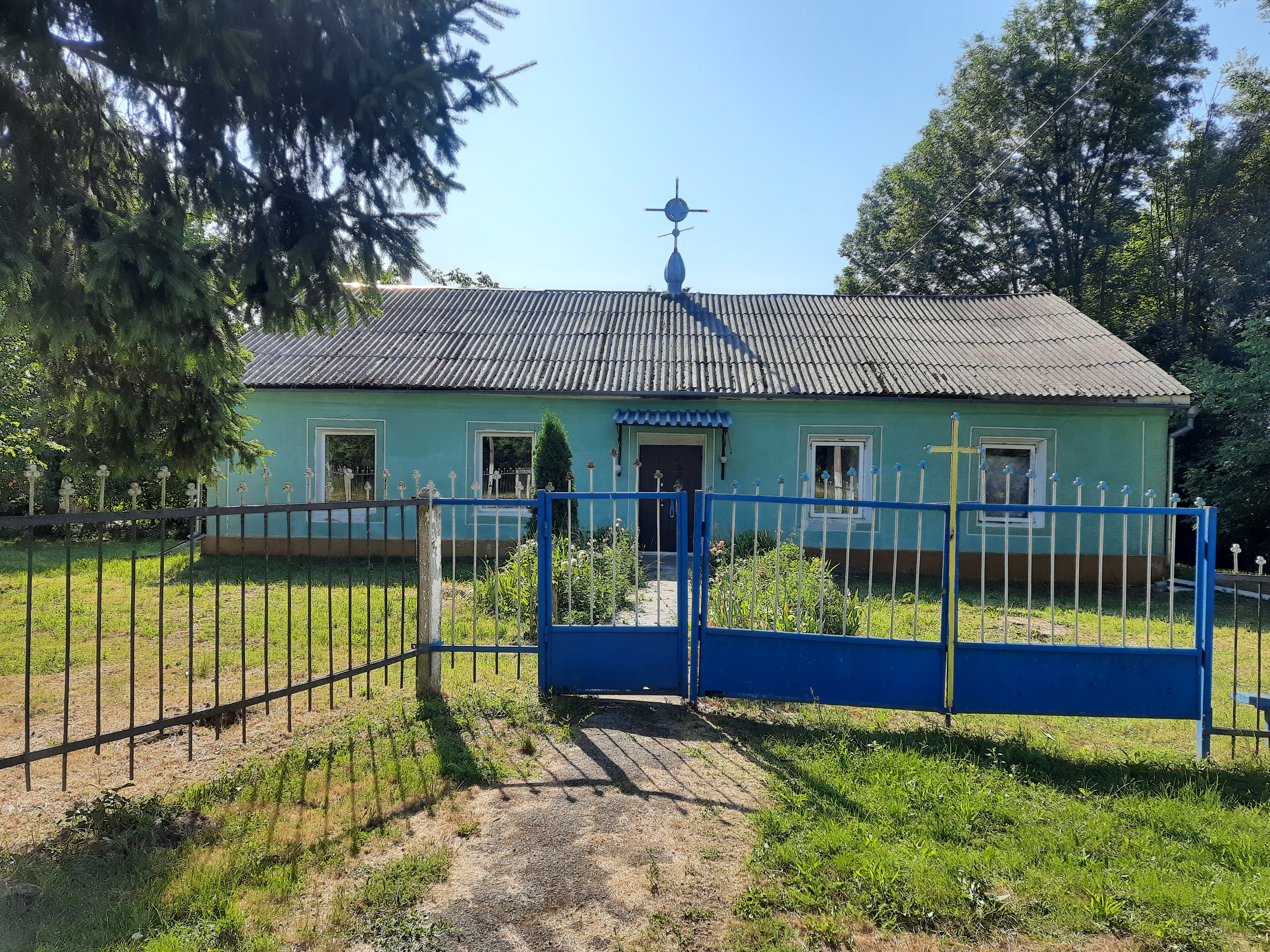

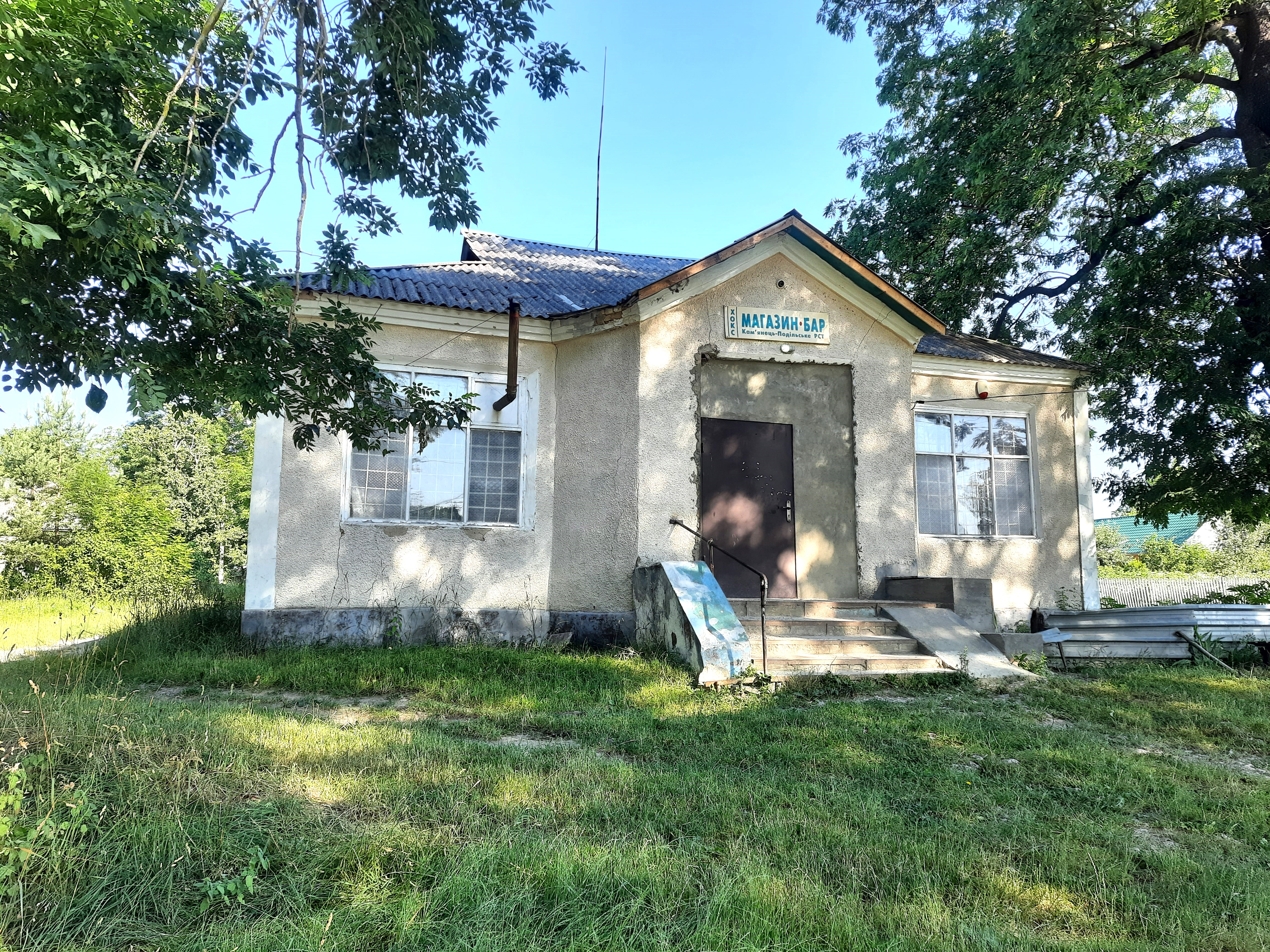

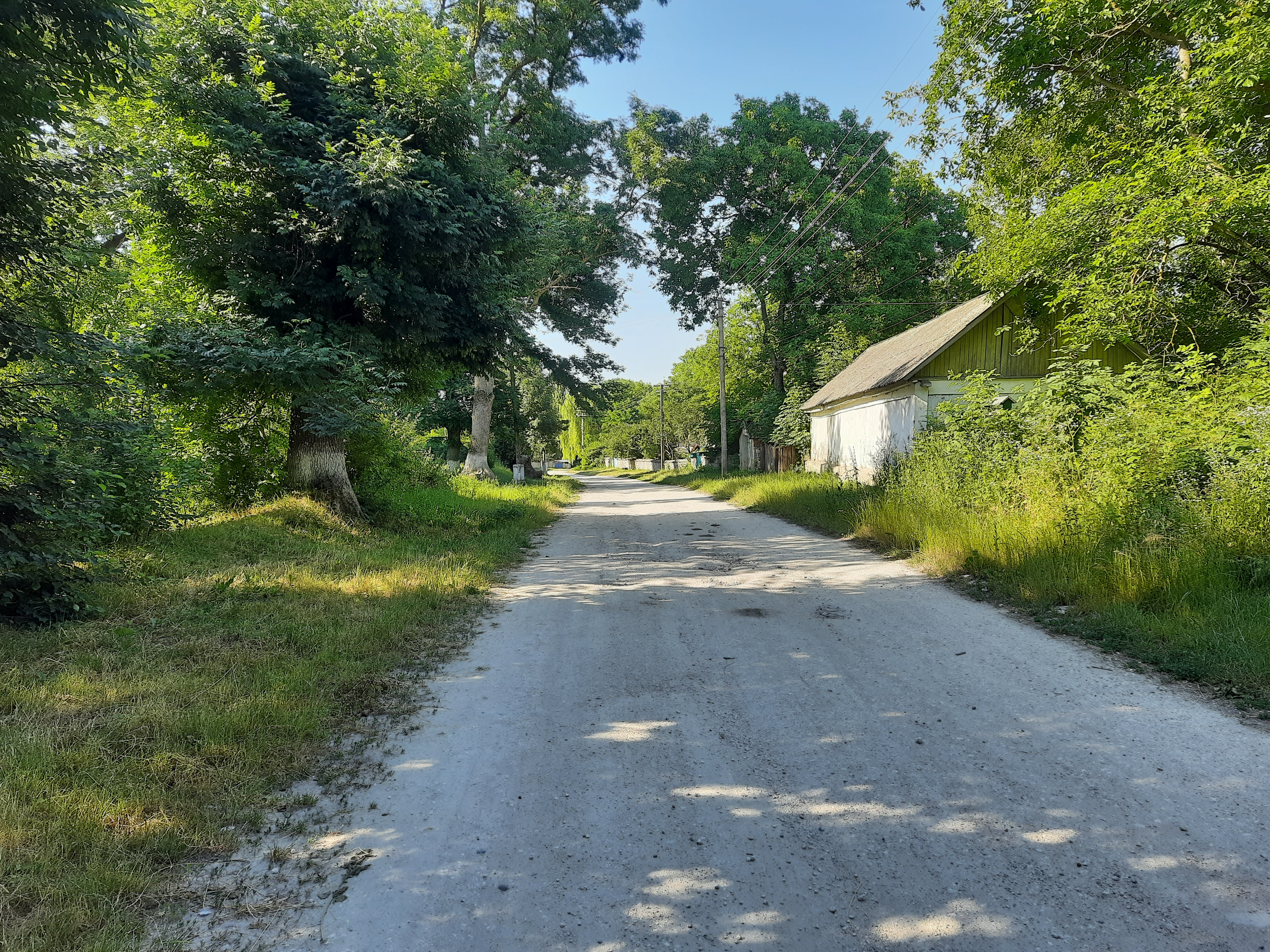

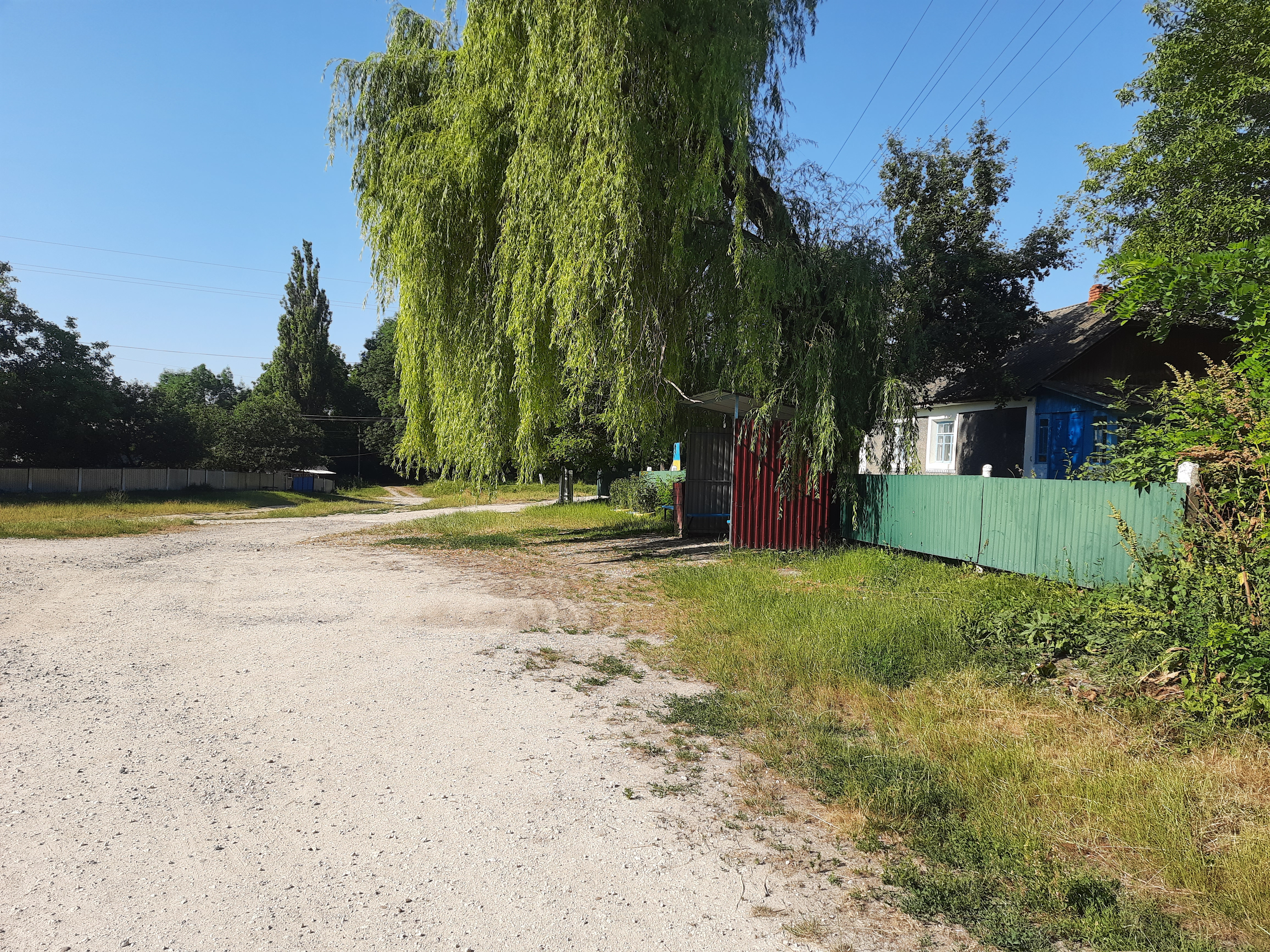

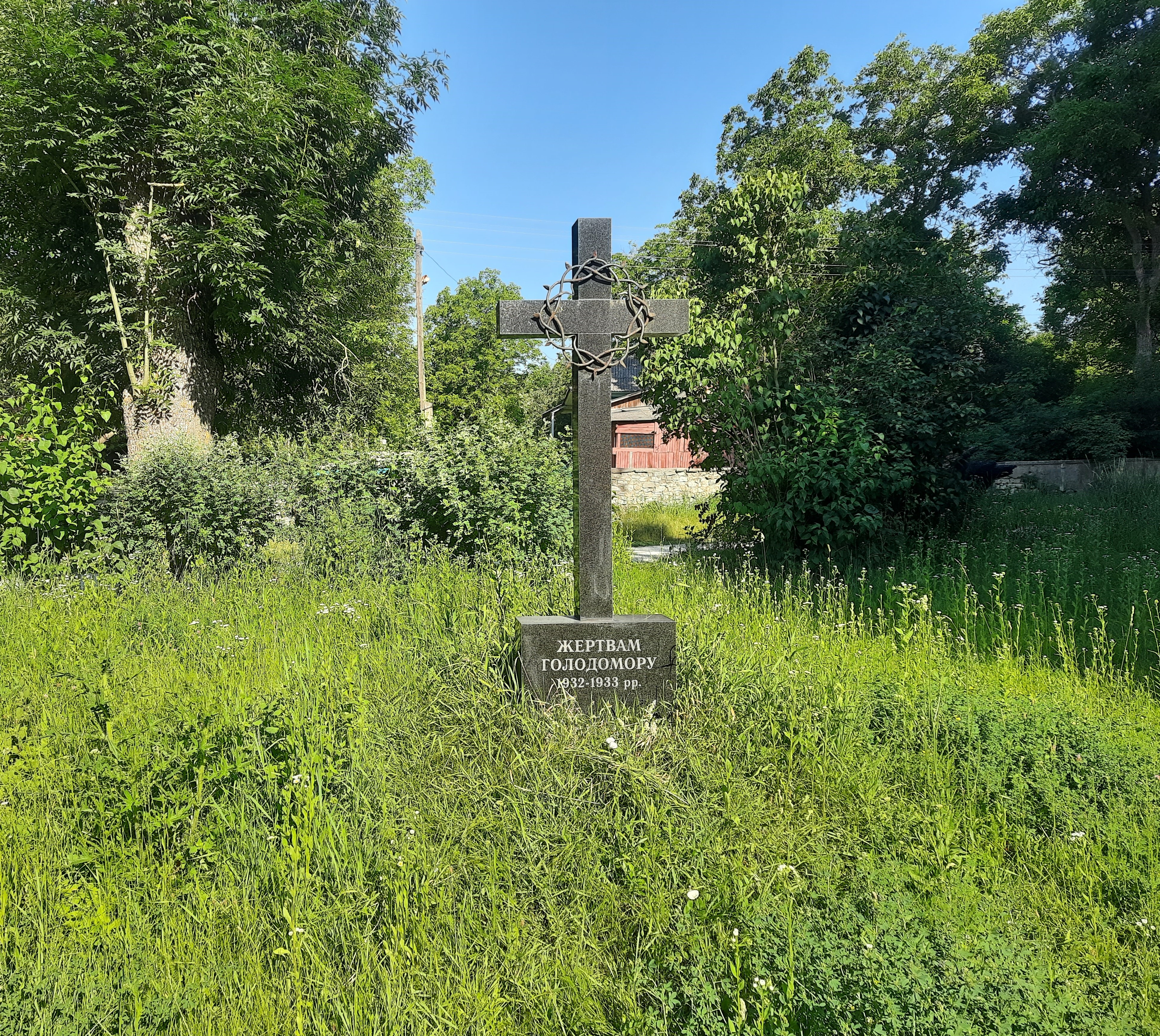

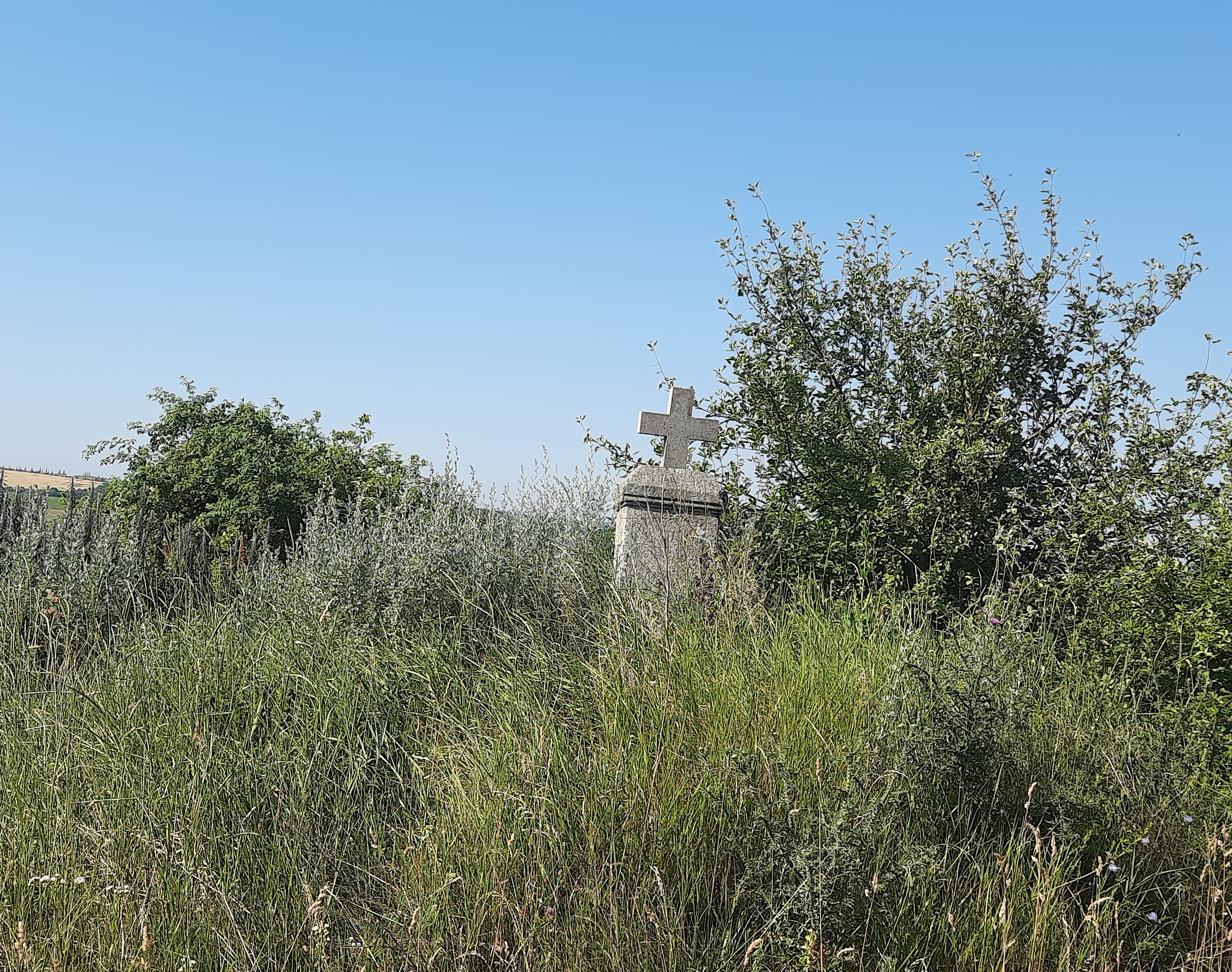
