= Dereviane, Rivne Oblast =

Dereviane Дерев'яне́
- Village
- Location of Dereviane in Ukraine
- Coordinates: 50°44′35″N 25°54′58″E
- Country: Ukraine
- Oblast: Rivne Oblast
- District: Rivne Raion
- Hromada: Zoria rural hromada
- Founded: 1445

Area
  - Total: 1.3 km^{2} (0.50 sq mi)
- Elevation: 187 m (614 ft)

Population (2001)
  - Total: 757
  - Density: 580/km^{2} (1,500/sq mi)
- Time zone: UTC+2 (EET)
  - Summer (DST): UTC+3 (EEST)
- Postal code: 35312
- Area code: +380 3622
- Website: http://rada.gov.ua/

Dereviane (Ukrainian: Дерев'яне́) is a village in the Rivne Raion (district) of Rivne Oblast (province) in western Ukraine. Its population is 757 as of the 2001 Ukrainian Census. Dereviane is accessed via the H 22, and is located 29.3 km northwest of Rivne, and 1.0 km northwest of Klevan and 49.4 kilometres southeast of Lutsk along the H 22.

== Local Government ==
The Village Rada. October Square 1, Village Zoria, Rivne Raion, Rivne Oblast, Ukraine, 35314 Ph.: +380-27-95-88

== Famous people from Dereviane ==
- Gavrýlo Fedorovich Shilo (Ukrainian: Гаврило Федорович Шило), Ukrainian linguist and lexicographer was born in 1910 in Dereviane.
- Andrew P. Layko (Ukrainian: Андрі́й Па́влович Лайко), Ukrainian military personnel, soldier of Ukrainian People's Army, chorąży of Anders' Army, participant Battle of Monte Cassino was born in 1897 in Dereviane.
