= Kolodiivka, Khmelnytskyi Oblast =

Rural locality in Khmelnytskyi Oblast, Ukraine

Kolodiivka Колодіївка
- Village
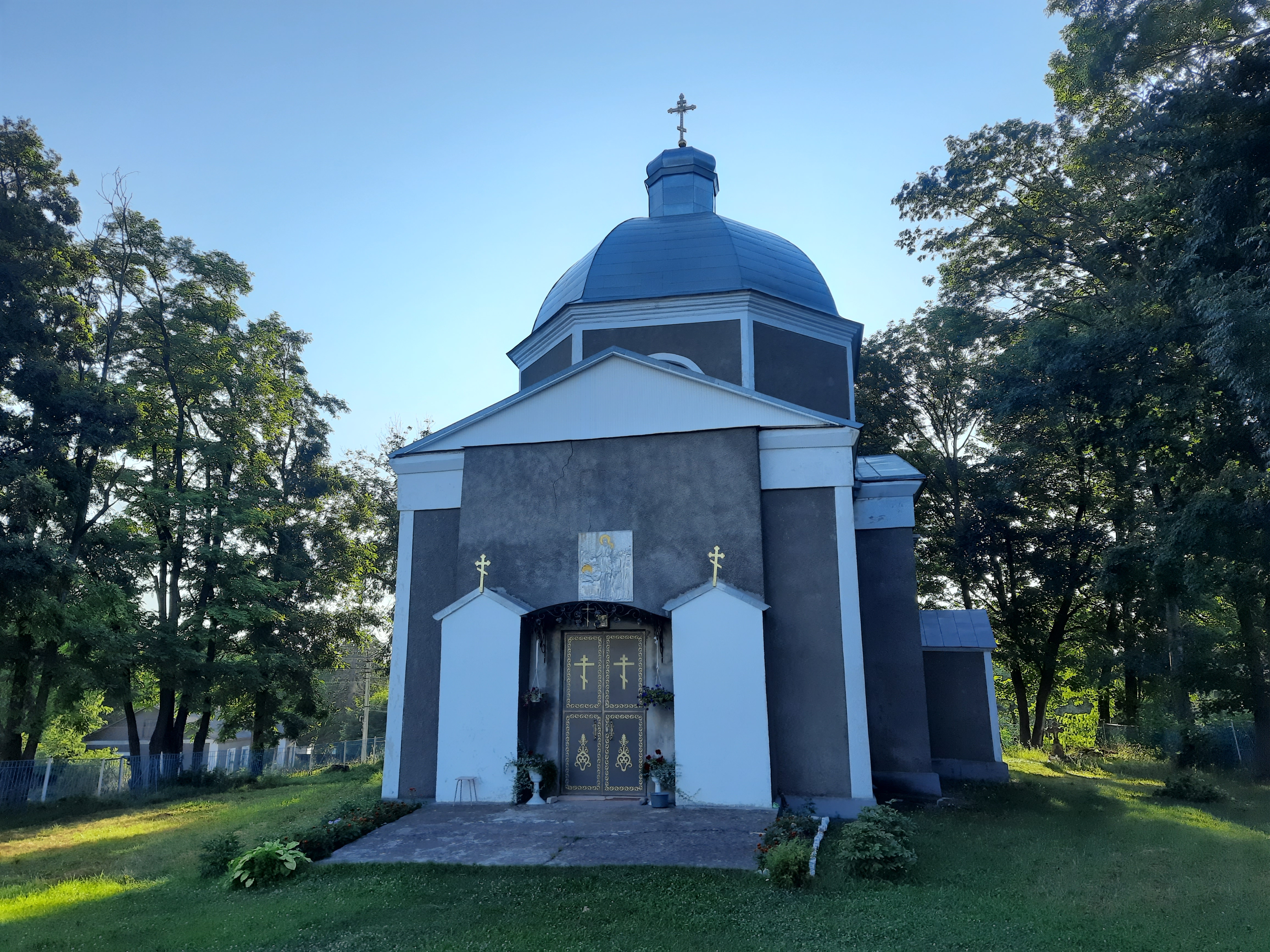

- Location of Kolodiivka in Khmelnytskyi Oblast Kolodiivka (Khmelnytskyi Oblast)
- Coordinates: 48°36′53″N 26°55′11″E
- Country: Ukraine
- Oblast: Khmelnytskyi Oblast
- Raion: Kamianets-Podilskyi Raion
- Hromada: Kytaihorod rural hromada

Area
  - Total: 4.082 km^{2} (1.576 sq mi)
- Elevation: 273 m (896 ft)

Population (2001)
  - Total: 1,042
  - Density: 255.3/km^{2} (661.1/sq mi)
- Time zone: UTC+2 (EET)
  - Summer (DST): UTC+3 (EEST)
- Postal code: 32398
- Area code: +380 3849
- Website: http://rada.gov.ua/

Kolodiivka (Ukrainian: Колодіївка) is a village in Kamianets-Podilskyi Raion (district) of Khmelnytskyi Oblast in western Ukraine. It belongs to Kytaihorod rural hromada, one of the hromadas of Ukraine. The village's population was 1,042 as of the 2001 Ukrainian census.

It is located in the southernmost portion of the oblast on the Dnister River at an elevation of 273 m (896 ft). The village maintains its own local government as the Kolodiivka Rural Council (Ukrainian: Колодіївська сільська рада, romanized: Kolodiivska silska rada), which consists of 21 locally elected deputies.
