= Tovtry (geographic region) =

Tovtry (Ukrainian: Товтри, Ukrainian pronunciation: [ˈtɔu̯trɪ]), also known as Medobory, is a belt of strongly dissected limestone ridges extending northwest-southeast across the Podolian Upland. With a length of nearly 250 km, the ridge extends from Pidkamin near Brody in the north through Zbarazh, Skalat, Kamianets-Podilskyi and reach the Prut River in Moldova.

== Name ==
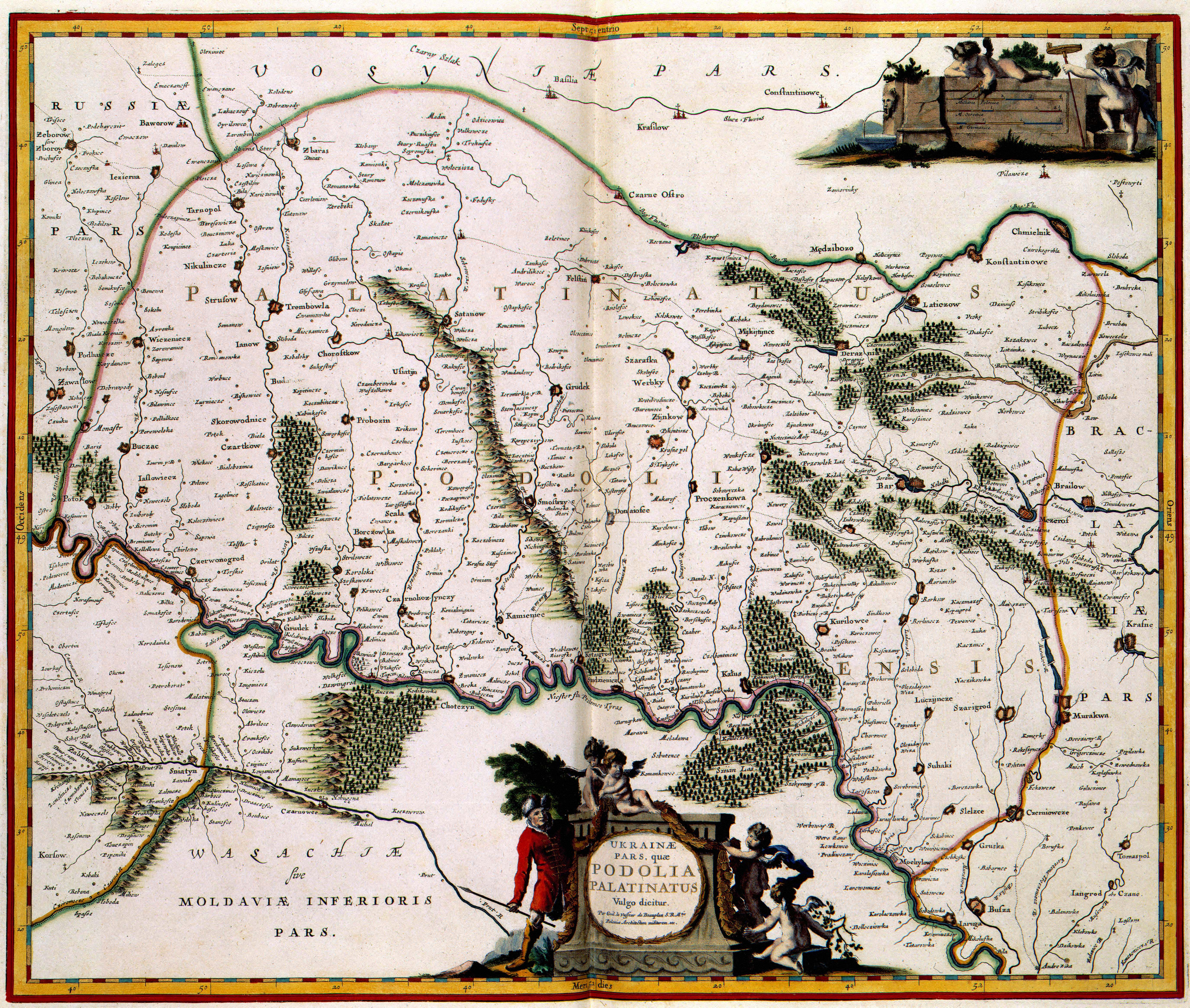
17th-century map of Podolia, showing the Tovtry ridge (marked as Montes Niedobur - "Medobory") in the middle

The name of Tovtry is believed to have Thracian origin and means "end of a sharp edge", deriving from the characteristic shape of the heights. In Latin the ridge was historically known as turtur mons.

== Geology ==
Formed as barrier reefs during the Neogene, the Tovtry are marked by karst features and contain numerous caves. The ridge consists of three main ranges and reaches maximum height of 430 meters, standing 50-100 meters above the surrounding plateau and providing a picturesque landscape marked with blue-gray and white cliffs and gullies created by the Zbruch and other rivers. The western slopes of Tovtry tend to be much steeper than the eastern ones.

== Nature ==
The slopes of Tovtry are covered with oak, beech, hornbeam, hazel and other trees and create a strict contrast with the surrounding farmland areas. Many plants growing in the area are used for production of honey, which caused the ridge to be known as "Honey Mountains" (медові гори).

== Human structures ==
The section of Tovtry between Sataniv and Husiatyn on the right (western) bank of the Zbruch is marked by the presence of megalithic structures and man-made caves stemming from the Medieval and Early modern era. According to one theory, the area served as a major centre of Slavic paganism during the Kyivan Rus era during the 10-13th centuries, following the expulsion of volkhvs from Kyiv by prince Volodymyr. A notable artifact discovered in the area is the Zbruch Idol, believed to depict the Slavic god Svetovit. During the latter period local caves were inhabited by hermit monks.

== Gallery ==
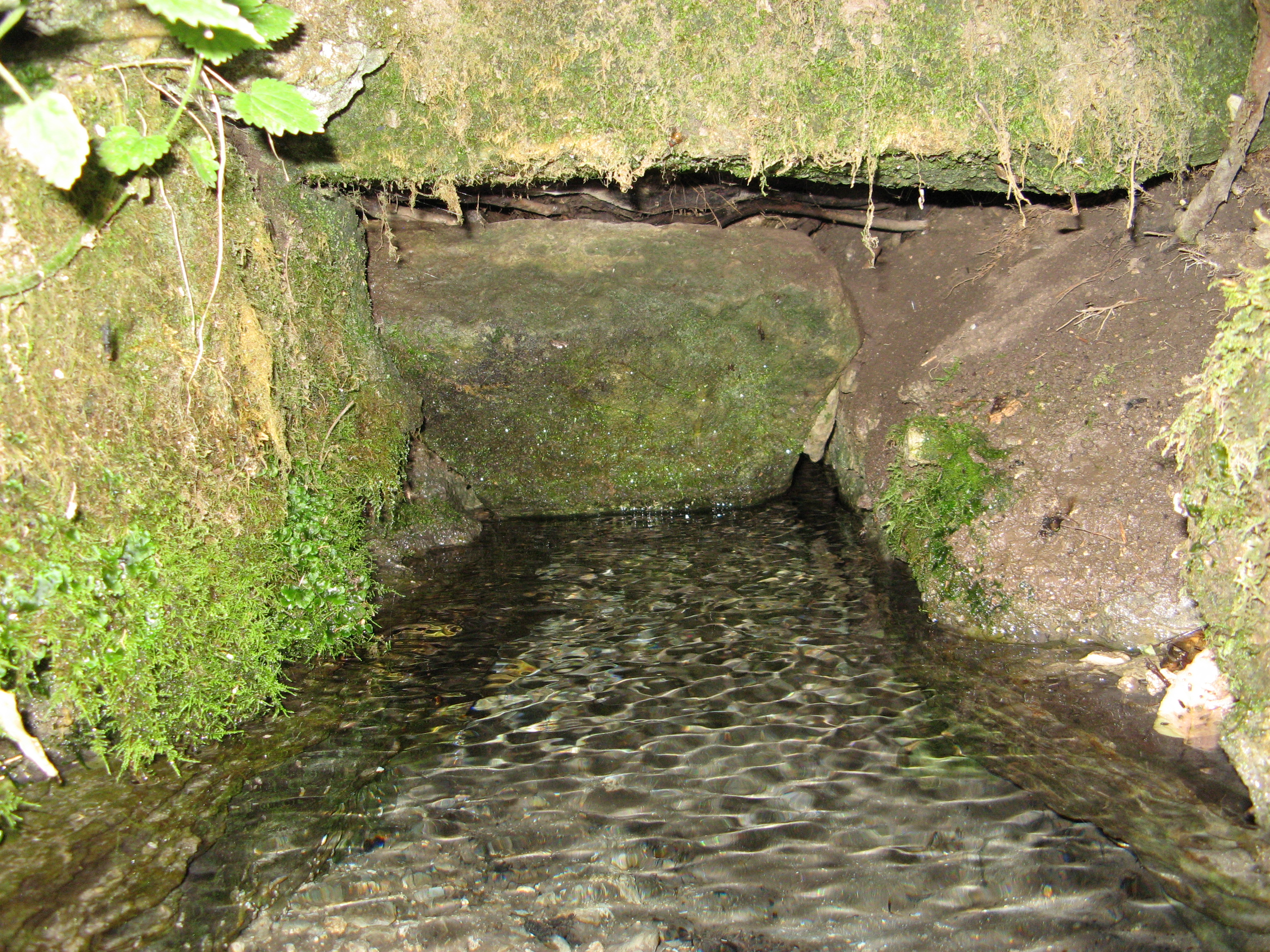
A water spring in Medobory

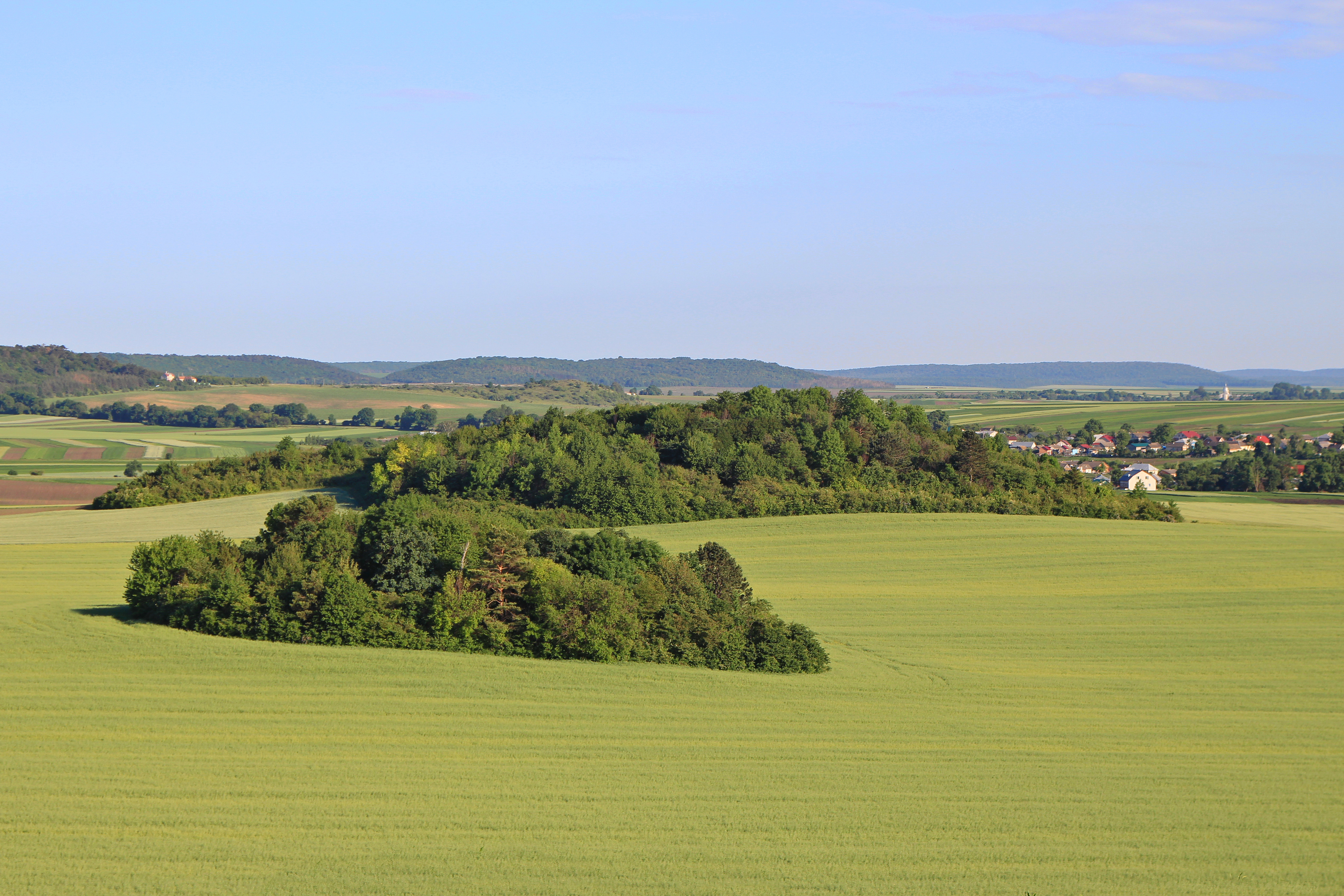
Tovtry in Khmelnytskyi Oblast

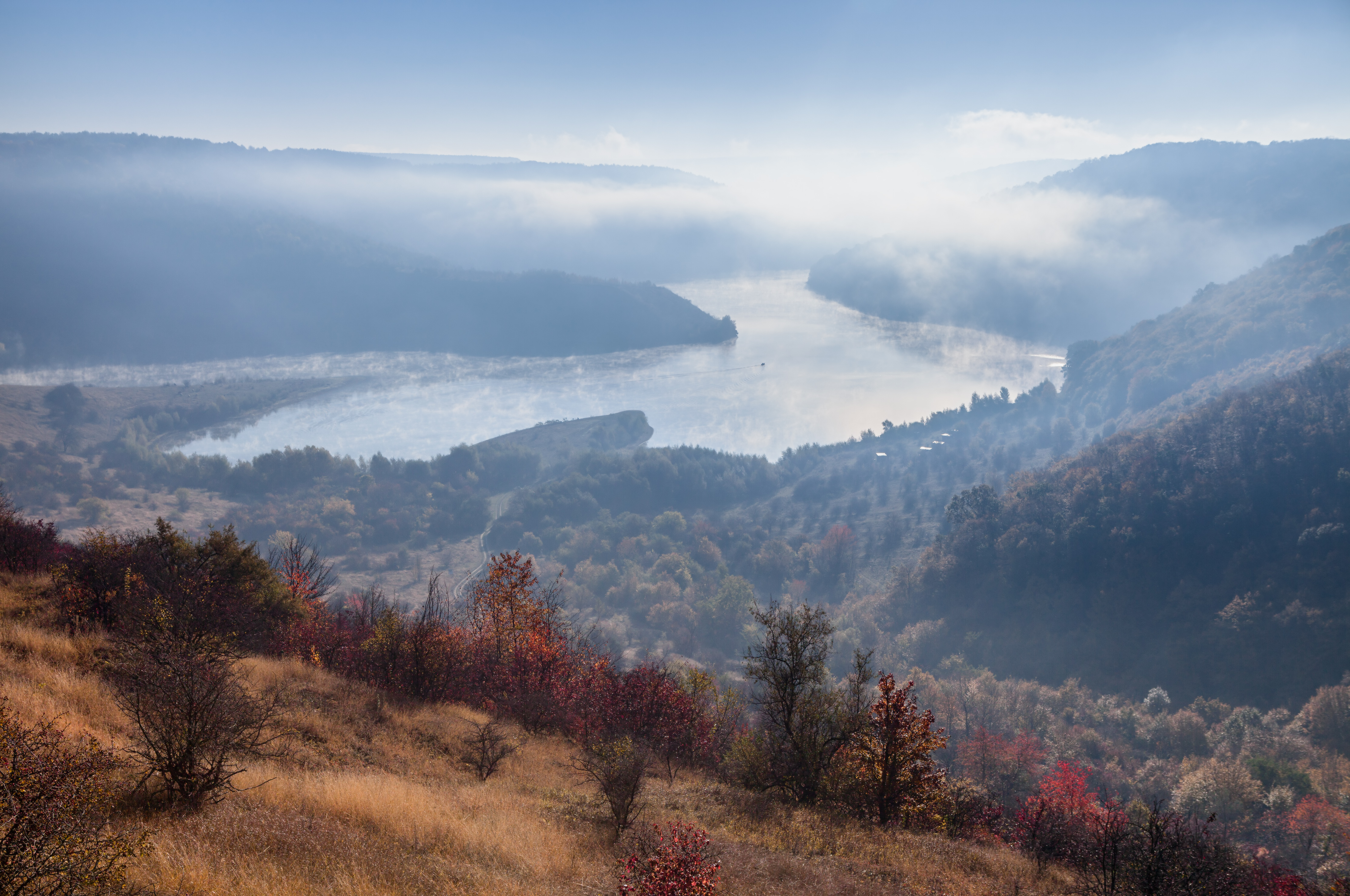
A landscape of Podolian Tovtry

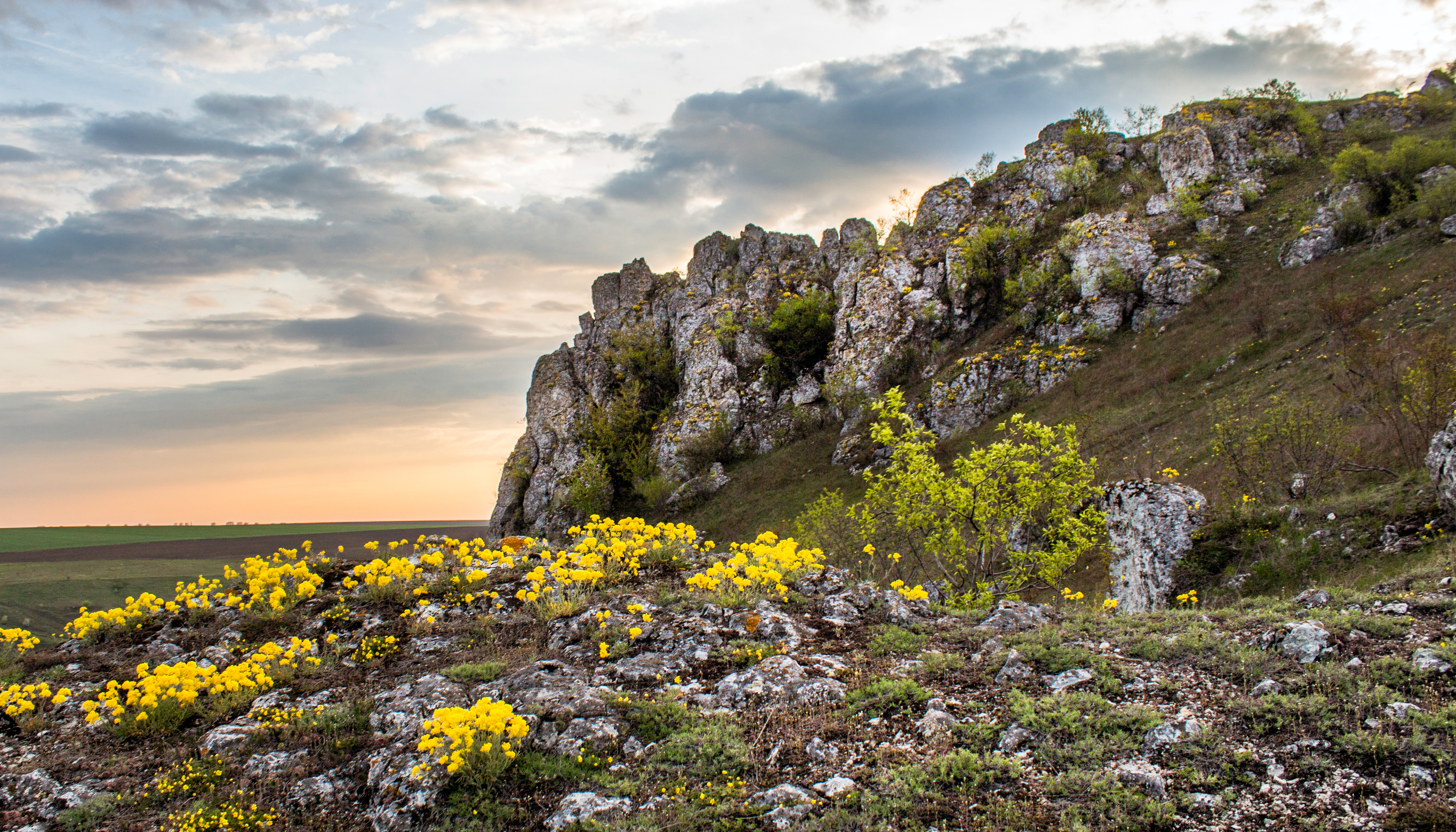
A view of Tovtry near Chemerivtsi

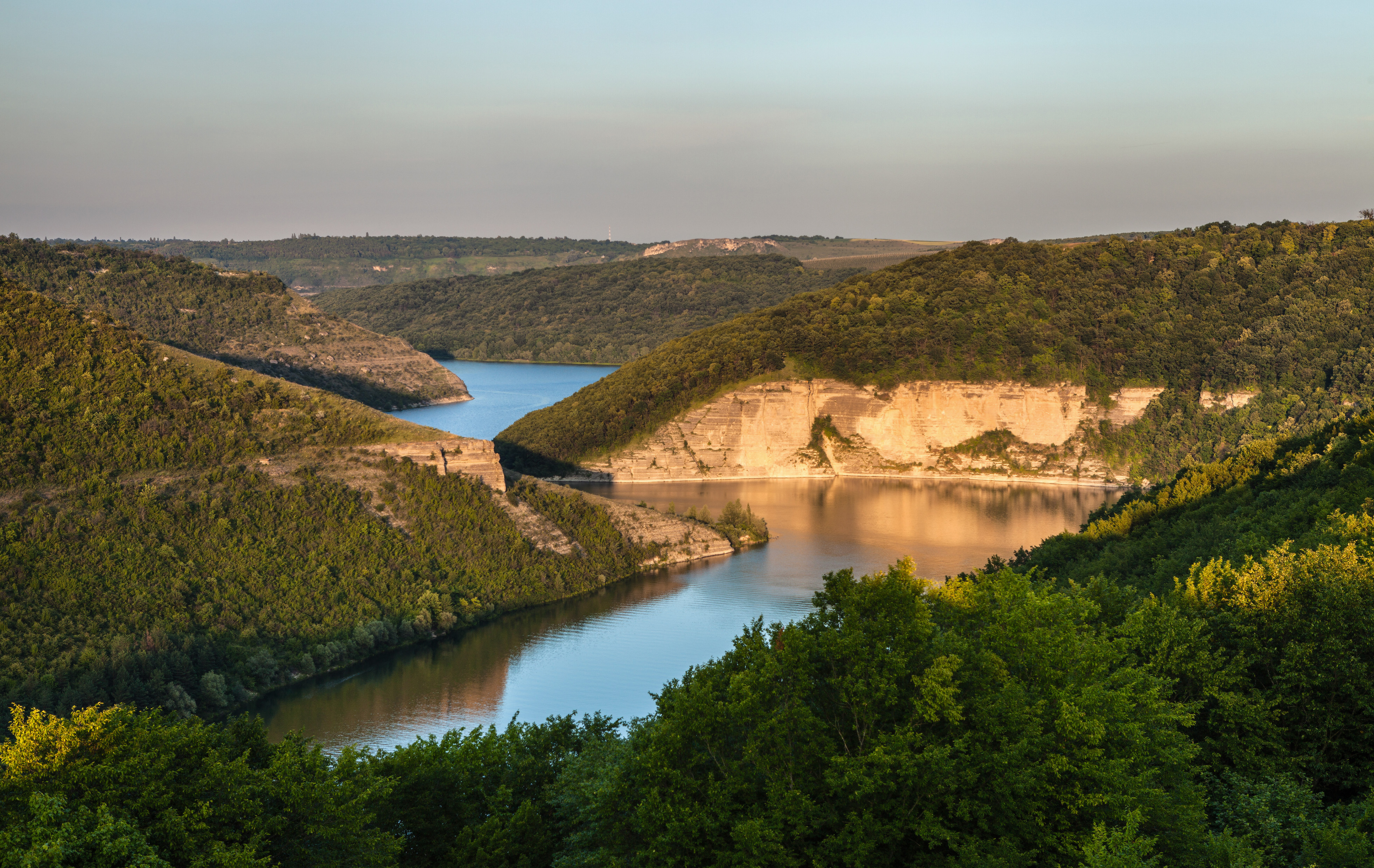
Valley of Ternava river

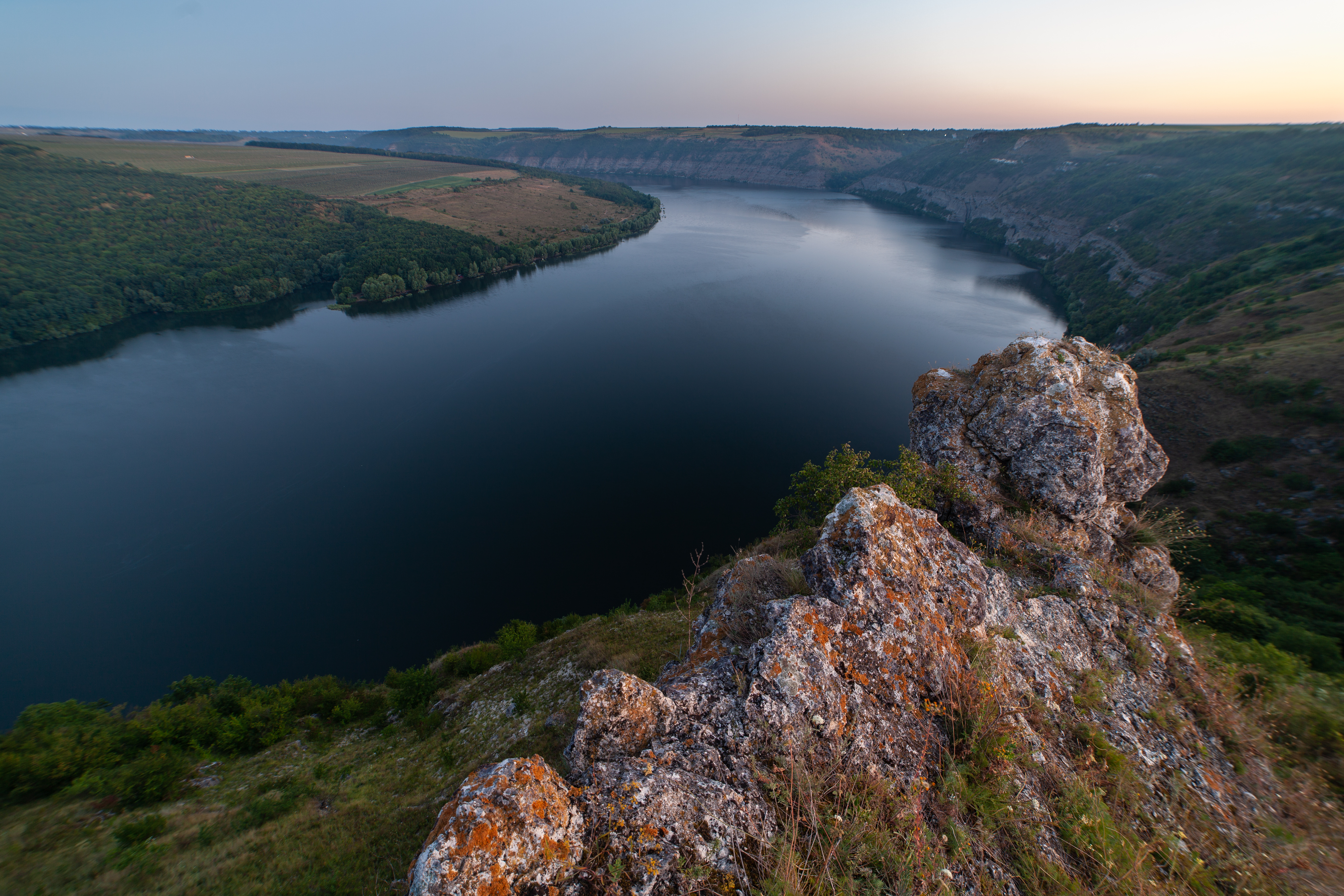
Rock formations over the Dniester

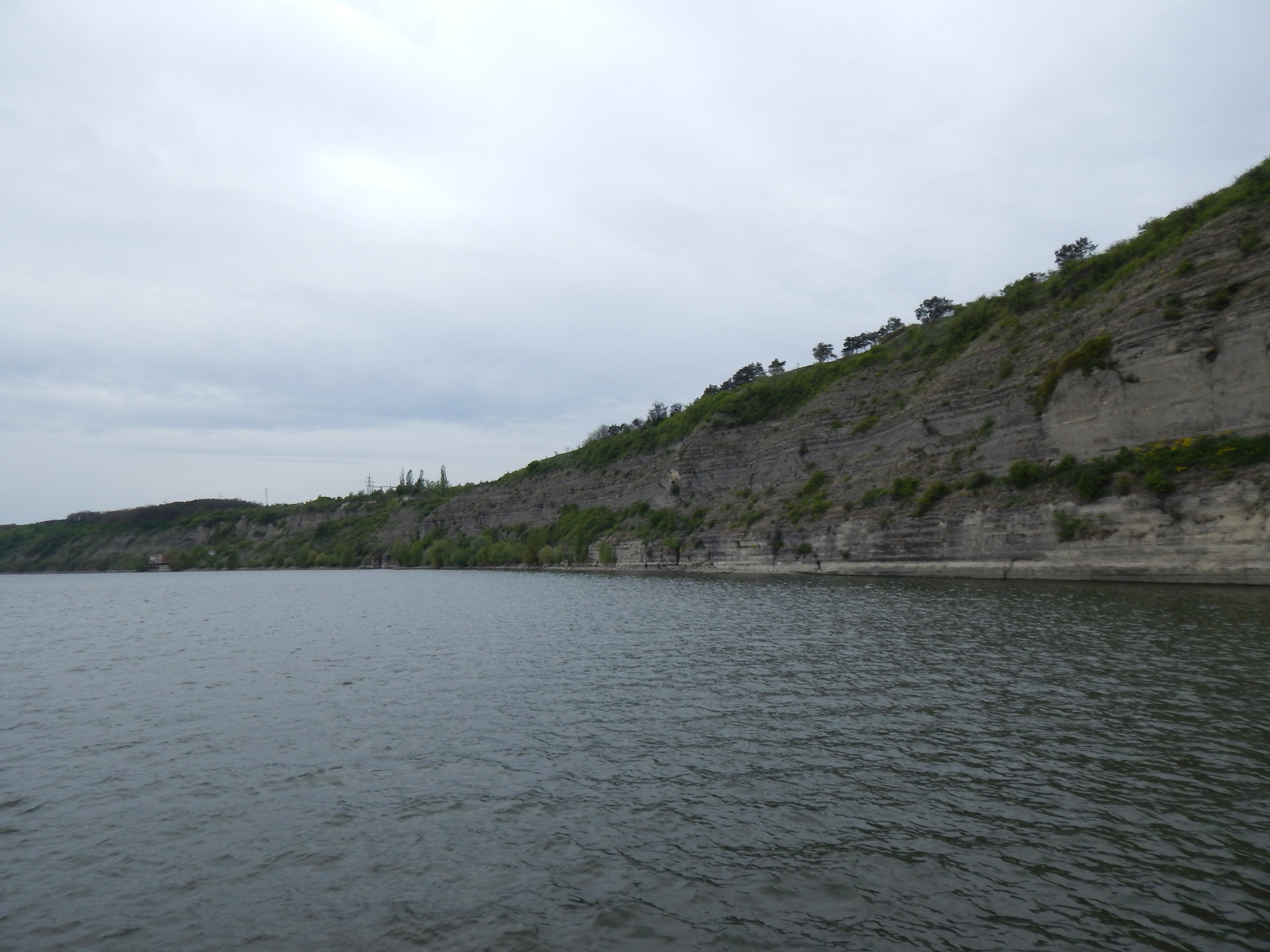
Slope of the Dniester Canyon formed by the ridge

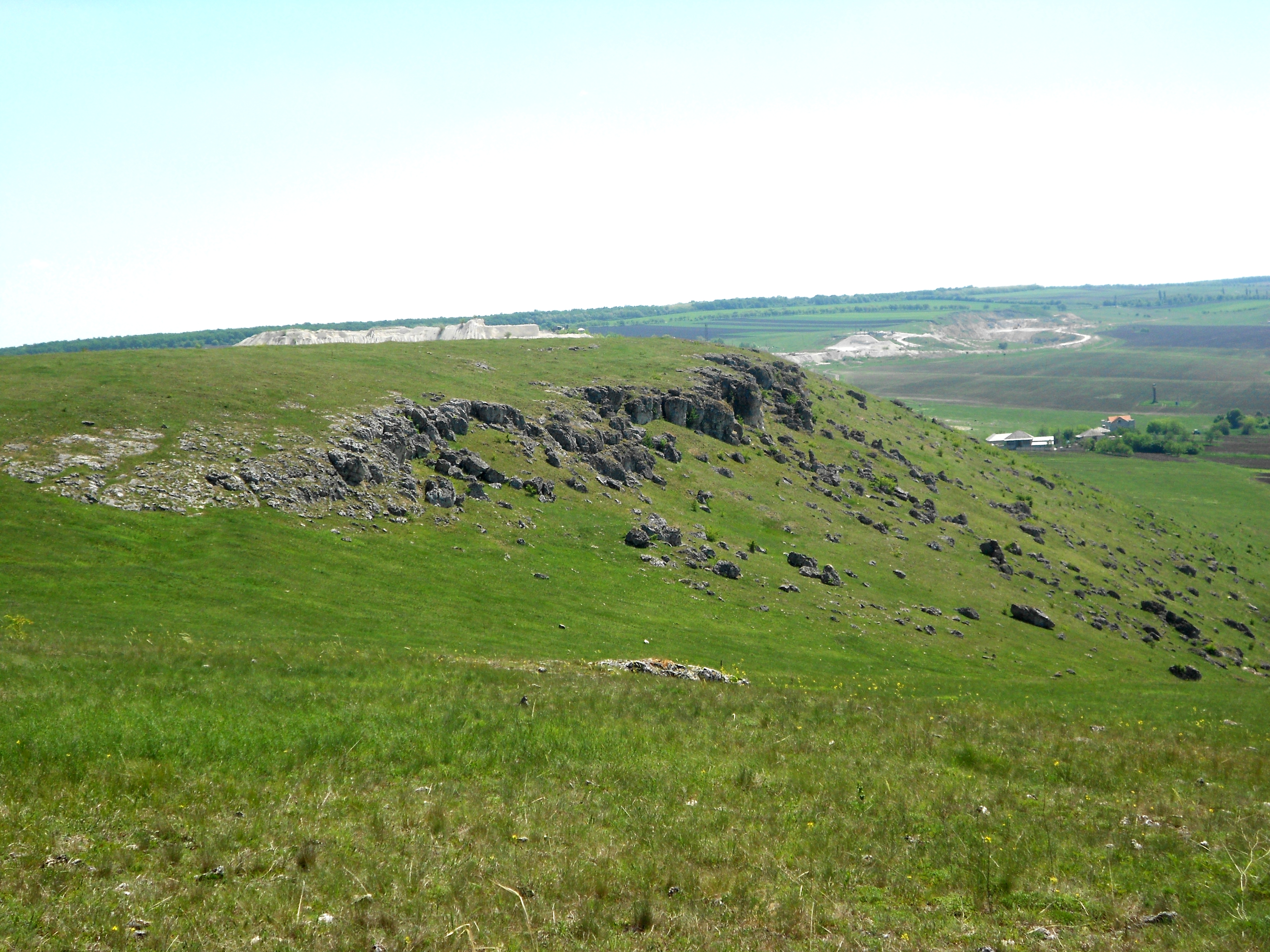
Tovtry near Edinet, Moldova

== See also ==
- Optymistychna Cave
- Medobory Nature Reserve
- Podilski Tovtry National Nature Park

== Sources ==
- Tovtry in Encyclopedia of Ukraine
