= Battle of Brovary =

Battle in the 2022 invasion of Ukraine

- Part of the northern front of the 2022 Russian invasion of Ukraine
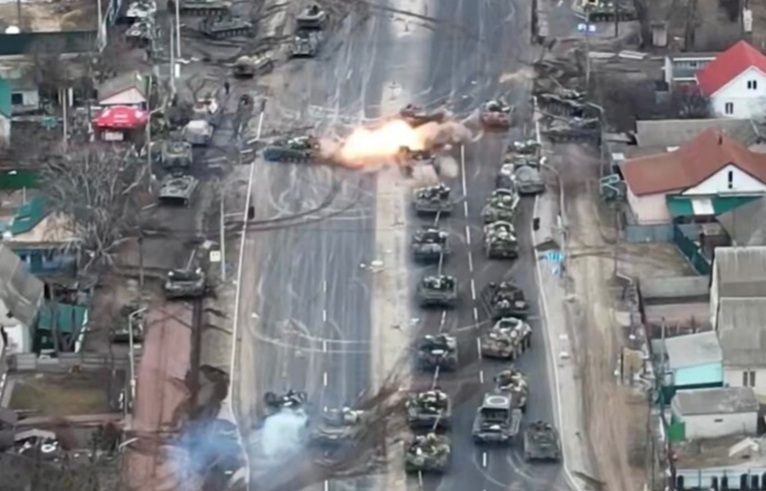
- A Russian tank column ambushed by Ukrainian troops in the village of Skybyn near Brovary, 10 March 2022
Date	9 March – 12 March 2022 (3 days)
Location	Brovary, Kyiv Oblast, Ukraine 50°30′41″N 30°47′25″E
Result	Ukrainian victory

Belligerents
Russia	Ukraine

Commanders and leaders
Andrei Zakharov †	Roman Darmohrai

Units involved
90th Guards Tank Division	72nd Mechanized Brigade; Azov Regiment; 49th Infantry Battallion; Territorial Defence

During the Russian invasion of Ukraine, a military engagement took place at Brovary, an eastern suburb of Kyiv, the capital city of Ukraine. Russian forces advanced west from southern Chernihiv Oblast and were engaged by Ukrainian forces. Russian forces withdrew from the area by 1-2 April 2022.

== Prelude ==
On the first day of invasion on 24 February 2022, Russian forces struck Brovary with missiles, targeting military barracks of the Ukrainian Army. As a result of the strikes, 6 people were killed and 12 wounded.

On 28 February Russian aviation attacked Brovary, killing one and wounding 5 people. On the same day, Russian columns entered the territory of Brovary Raion, occupying the villages of Mokrets, Bervytsia and Zavorychi and moving in the direction of Kyiv-Chernihiv and Kyiv-Sumy highways.

By early March, fighting was taking place in the territories of Baryshivka, Kalyta and Velyka Dymerka hromadas. As a result, Russian troops were able to occupy Bohdanivka, Zalissia and Velyka Dymerka, approaching the immediate vicinity of Brovary.

== Battle ==
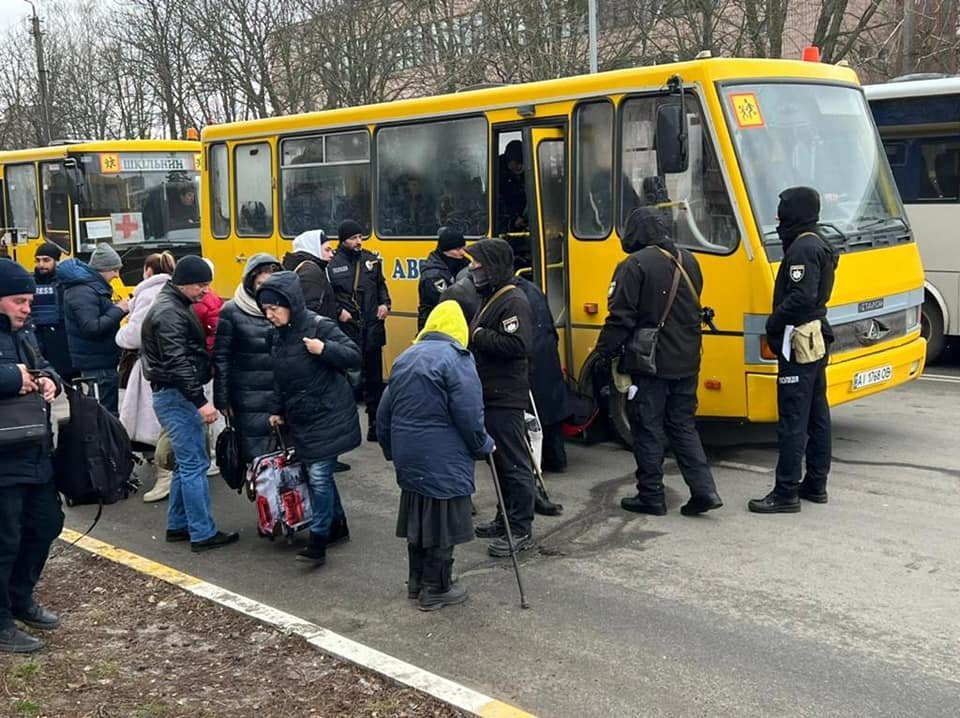
Ukrainian civilians evacuating Brovary on 13 March 2022

On the evening of 9 March 2022, a column of Russian armored vehicles advanced into Brovary from the north via Highway M01. The column, consisting of the 6th and 239th Tank Regiments of the 90th Guards Tank Division, moved very slowly and included a number of obsolete vehicles, such as older T-72 tanks, advancing without infantry support. In addition, the convoy was headed by self-propelled artillery such as TOS-1, which were especially vulnerable targets.

The command of the 72nd Mechanized Brigade's 3rd Mechanized Battalion, led by major Roman Darmohrai, organized the defence of Brovary and the nearby villages of Pukhivka, Rozhivka and Kalynivka, preparing firing positions and ambushes against advancing Russian troops. Equipped with 32 BMP-2 infantry fighting vehicles, the battalion had at its disposal a 120 mm mortar battery, as well as several DShK machine guns, NLAW and FGM-148 Javelin anti-tank systems. Additionally, two RK-3 Corsar and two Stuhna anti-tank systems were concentrated in the area.

On 10 March, at Skybyn village on the northern outskirts of Brovary, the 1st and 3rd mechanized battalions of the 72nd Brigade encountered elements of the 6th Tank Regiment, part of the Russian 90th Tank Division. Warned about the Russian advance by local inhabitants, Ukrainian forces saw an opportunity to ambush the Russian troops and attacked. Using artillery and antitank missiles, the Ukrainians disabled several tanks and armored personnel carriers. A Ukrainian soldier later stated that the ambushers initially targeted the first and last vehicles in the convoy to trap the rest in the middle. The attack was not entirely successful, as the Ukrainians were unable to cut off the Russians' route of retreat. However, the Russian column suffered heavy losses and was forced to withdraw. Ukrainian officials claimed that the commander of the 6th Tank Regiment, Colonel Andrei Zakharov, was killed in the skirmish. Some Russian soldiers reportedly fled on foot into the nearby woods and villages.

As a result of the fighting on 10 March, Russian forces lost 19 tanks destroyed or damaged, with the remaining 49 vehicles being forced to retreat. Additionally, 3 Russian IFVs, one BTR-82A and up to 55 soldiers, including the regiment's commander colonel Zakharov were eliminated. The Ukrainian side lost one soldier killed in action and 5 wounded. Despite the retreat of the 90th Guards Tank Division, heavy fighting erupted in villages east of the ambush site, where fighting lasted for several days between Russian and Ukrainian troops. Russian survivors of the ambush shot civilians in the villages, suspecting them of aiding the local defenders.

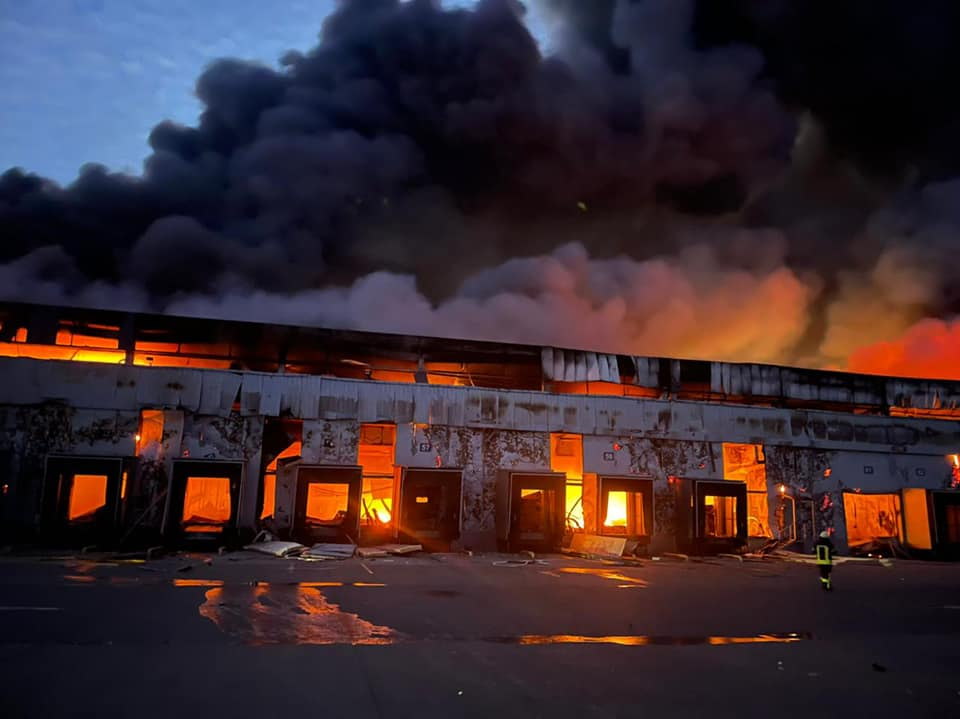
Food warehouse in Kvitneve village after the strike on 12 March

On 12 March, a Russian strike destroyed a food warehouse in Kvitneve village near Brovary; at the time, it was one of the largest food storage facilities in Europe. 50,000 tons of food were destroyed. This could have been an attempt to cut access to food for Kyiv. Russia claimed it had disabled the Ukrainian military's main centre for radio intelligence in Brovary with a high-precision strike. On the same day, the mayor of Brovary, Ihor Sapozhko said fighting was taking place nearly 25 kilometers from the city, claimed the Russians had suffered heavy casualties, and was quoted as saying: "We are ready for them."

== Aftermath ==
On 29 March, Russia shelled the Brovary area. A warehouse was set ablaze and nearby villages sustained heavy damage.

=== Russian withdrawal and Ukrainian counterattack ===
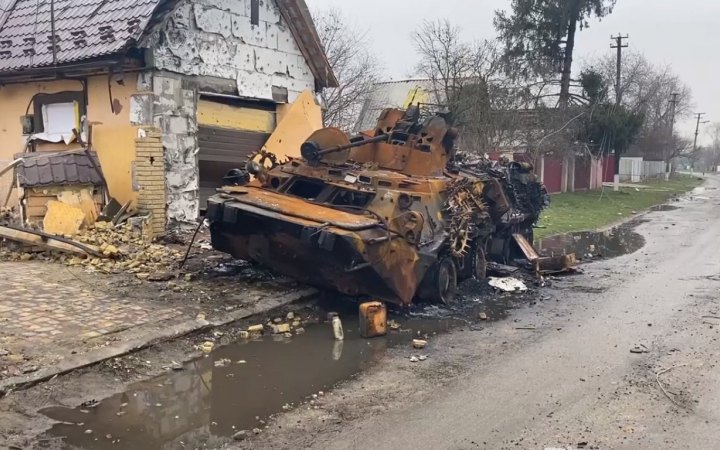
An abandoned Russian armoured vehicle in the village of Ploske near Brovary

On 30 March, а Telegram channel stated that Ukrainian forces had pushed back Russian troops and recaptured the villages of Ploske, Svitylnia, and Hrebel'ky, with ongoing clashes in Nova Basan.

On 1 April, the Ukrainian military claimed to have recaptured the villages of Rudnya, Shevchenkove, Bobryk, Stara Basan, Nova Basan, Makiyivka, Pohreby, Bazhanivka, Volodymyrivka, Shnyakivka, Salne, Sofiyivka, and Havrylivka, following the departure of Russian forces. Sapozhko claimed that Russian forces had "almost left" the entire Brovary district, with Ukrainian forces engaging in "mopping up" operations.

On 2 April 2022 the whole of Kyiv Oblast was declared free of Russian troops by the Ukrainian Ministry of Defense.
