= Litky =

Litky (Ukrainian: Літки) may refer to the following places in Ukraine:

- Litky, Khmelnytskyi Oblast, village in Khmelnytskyi Raion
- Litky, Kyiv Oblast, village in Brovary Raion
- Litky, Zhytomyr Oblast, village in Korosten Raion
