= 18th Army Corps (Ukraine) =

Ukrainian Ground Forces formation

- 18-й армійський корпус
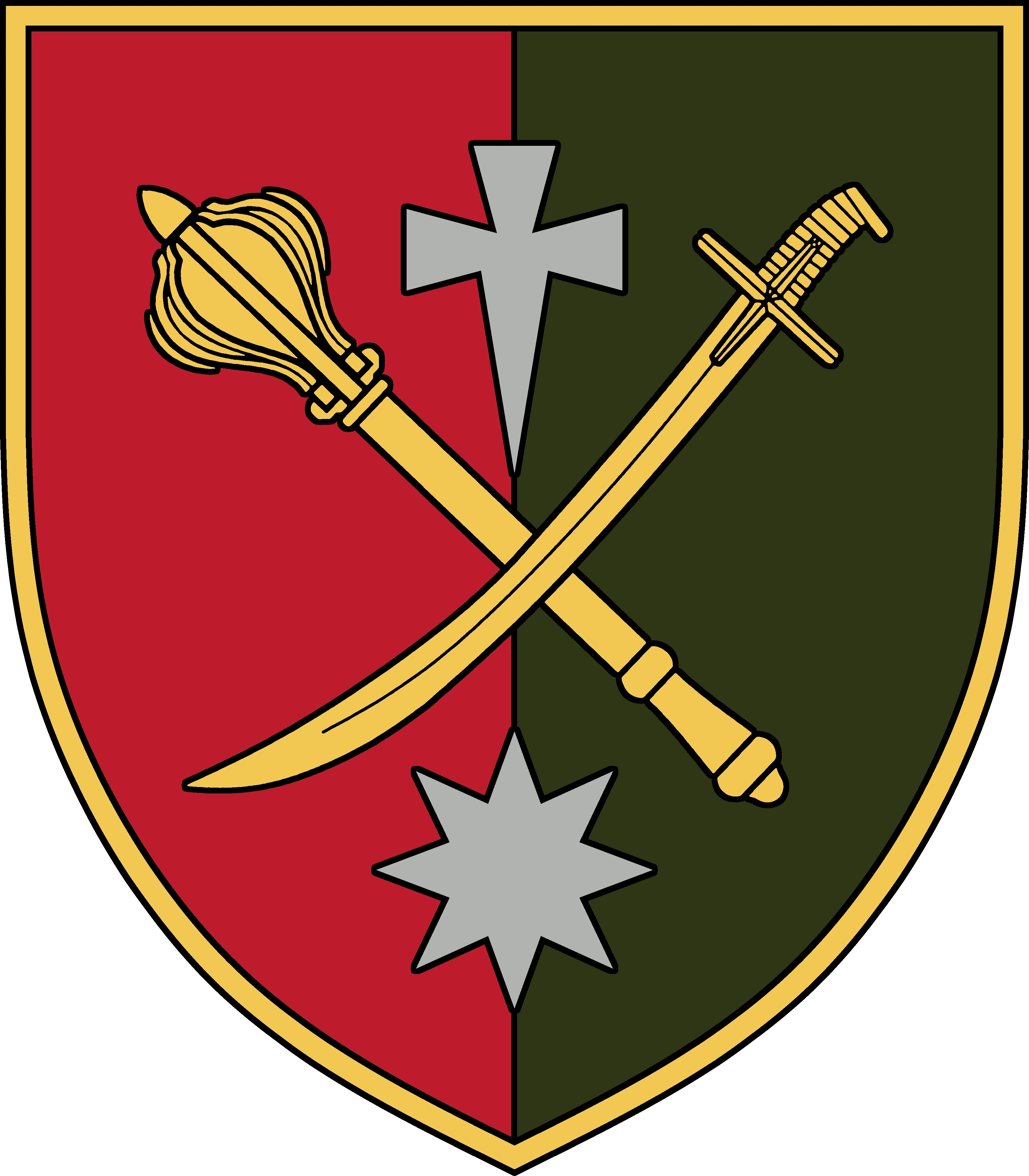
- Active: March 2025 – present
- Country: Ukraine
- Allegiance: Armed Forces of Ukraine
- Branch: Ukrainian Ground Forces
- Type: Mechanized Infantry
- Size: Corps
- Part of: Operational Command West
- Garrison/HQ: Cherkasy Oblast
- Mottos: Sapiens vincit (Latin); The wise wins.
- Engagements: Russo-Ukrainian War
- Website: Official Facebook page

Commanders
- Current commander: Col. Roman Darmohrai

Insignia
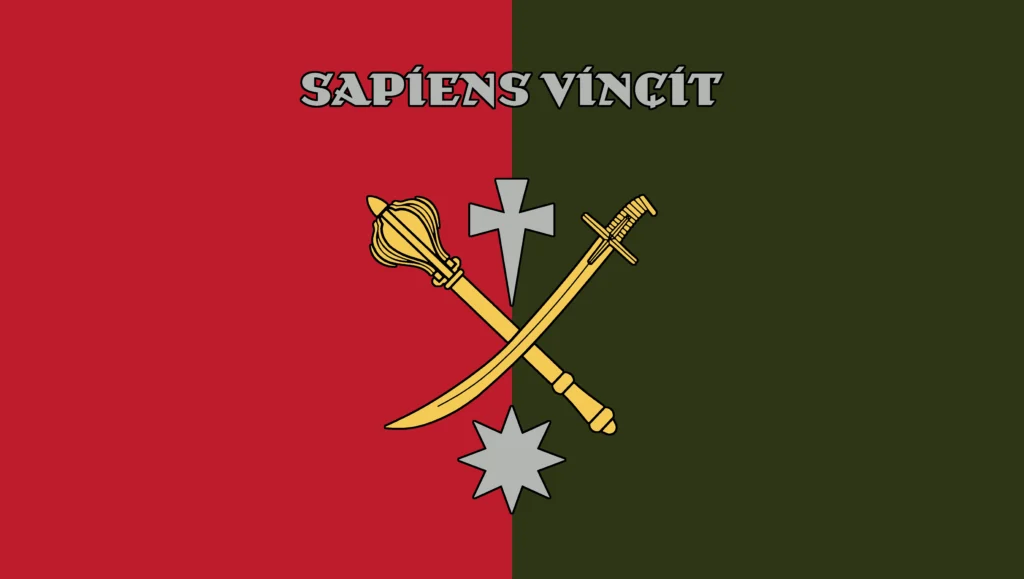
- Battle flag

The 18th Army Corps (Ukrainian: 18-й армійський корпус) is a Corps of the Ukrainian Ground Forces.

== History ==
The 18th Army Corps was formed as part of Ukraine's ongoing defense reforms. They aimed to improve command structures and operational readiness amid the Russian invasion of Ukraine (2022). On April 12, 2025, the commander of the 10th Mountain Assault Brigade, Colonel Roman Darmohrai, was appointed as the commander of the Corps. Darmohray transferred his previous position to the brigade’s Chief of Staff, Colonel Volodymyr Potyeashkin.

David Axe claimed that the 18th Army Corps was responsible for holding a defensive line in the Sumy region in August 2025, but that its 156th Brigade had been deployed to the Pokrovsk front in September.

== Structure ==
Soldier of the 22nd Battalion

As of 2026 the corps structure is as follows:

- 18th Army Corps
  - Corps Headquarters
    - Management
    - Commandant Platoon
  - 1st Heavy Mechanized Brigade
  - 21st Mechanized Brigade
  - 22nd Unmanned Systems Battalion
  - 47th Mechanized Brigade
  - 47th Artillery Brigade
  - 52nd Reconnaissance Battalion
  - 66th Mechanized Brigade
  - 83rd Morale Support Center
  - 98th Support Battalion
  - 99th Anti-Tank Battalion
  - 104th Territorial Defense Brigade
  - 106th Territorial Defense Brigade
  - 129th Communications Battalion
  - 156th Mechanized Brigade
  - 517th Maintenance Battalion
  - 532nd Security Battalion
  - 1180th Anti-Aircraft Missile Defense Artillery Battalion
  - State Secret Protection Center
  - Logistics Battalion
