= Zelene =

Zelene (Ukrainian: Зелене, English: 'green') may refer to several places in Ukraine:

== Places ==
Crimea

- Zelene, Bakhchysarai Raion, Crimea, village in Bakhchysarai Raion
- Zelene, Nyzhnohirskyi Raion, Crimea, village in Nyzhnohirskyi Raion

Ivano-Frankivsk Oblast

- Zelene, Ivano-Frankivsk Oblast, village in Verkhovyna Raion

Kyiv Oblast

- Zelene, Kyiv Oblast, village in Brovary Raion

Odesa Oblast

- Zelene, Odesa Oblast, village in Bilhorod-Dnistrovskyi Raion

=== Volyn Oblast ===
- Zelene, Volyn Oblast, village in Lutsk Raion

Zaporizhzhia Oblast

- Zelene, Polohy Raion, Zaporizhzhia Oblast, village in Polohy Raion
- Zelene, Novomykolaivka settlement hromada, Zaporizhzhia Raion, Zaporizhzhia Oblast, village in Zaporizhzhia Raion
- Zelene, Vilniansk urban hromada, Zaporizhzhia Raion, Zaporizhzhia Oblast, village in Zaporizhzhia Raion

== See also ==
- Zelena
