= Zelene, Kyiv Oblast =

Village in Kyiv Oblast, Ukraine

Zelene Зелене
- Village
- Location within Kyiv Oblast Location within Ukraine
- Coordinates: 50°21′26″N 32°01′21″E
- Country: Ukraine
- Oblast: Kyiv Oblast
- Raion: Brovary Raion
- Hromada: Zghurivka settlement hromada

Area
  - Total: 0.728 km^{2} (0.281 sq mi)
- Elevation: 118 m (387 ft)

Population
  - Estimate (2020): 7
- Time zone: UTC+2 (EET)
  - Summer (DST): UTC+3 (EEST)
- Postal Code: 07653
- Area code: +380 4570

Zelene (Ukrainian: Зелене) is a village in Brovary Raion, Kyiv Oblast (region) of Ukraine. It is part of Zghurivka settlement hromada, one of the hromadas of Ukraine.

Until 18 July 2020, Zelene was located in Zghurivka Raion. The raion was abolished that day as part of the administrative reform of Ukraine, which reduced the number of raions of Kyiv Oblast to seven. The area of Zghurivka Raion was merged into Brovary Raion.
