= Kalynivka settlement hromada =

Kalynivka settlement hromada (Ukrainian: Калинівська селищна громада) may refer to either of:

- Kalynivka settlement hromada, Fastiv Raion, Kyiv Oblast
- Kalynivka settlement hromada, Brovary Raion, Kyiv Oblast
