= St. George's Church, Zavorychi =

Church in Zavorychi, Ukraine

Coordinates: 50°42′14″N 31°09′03″E

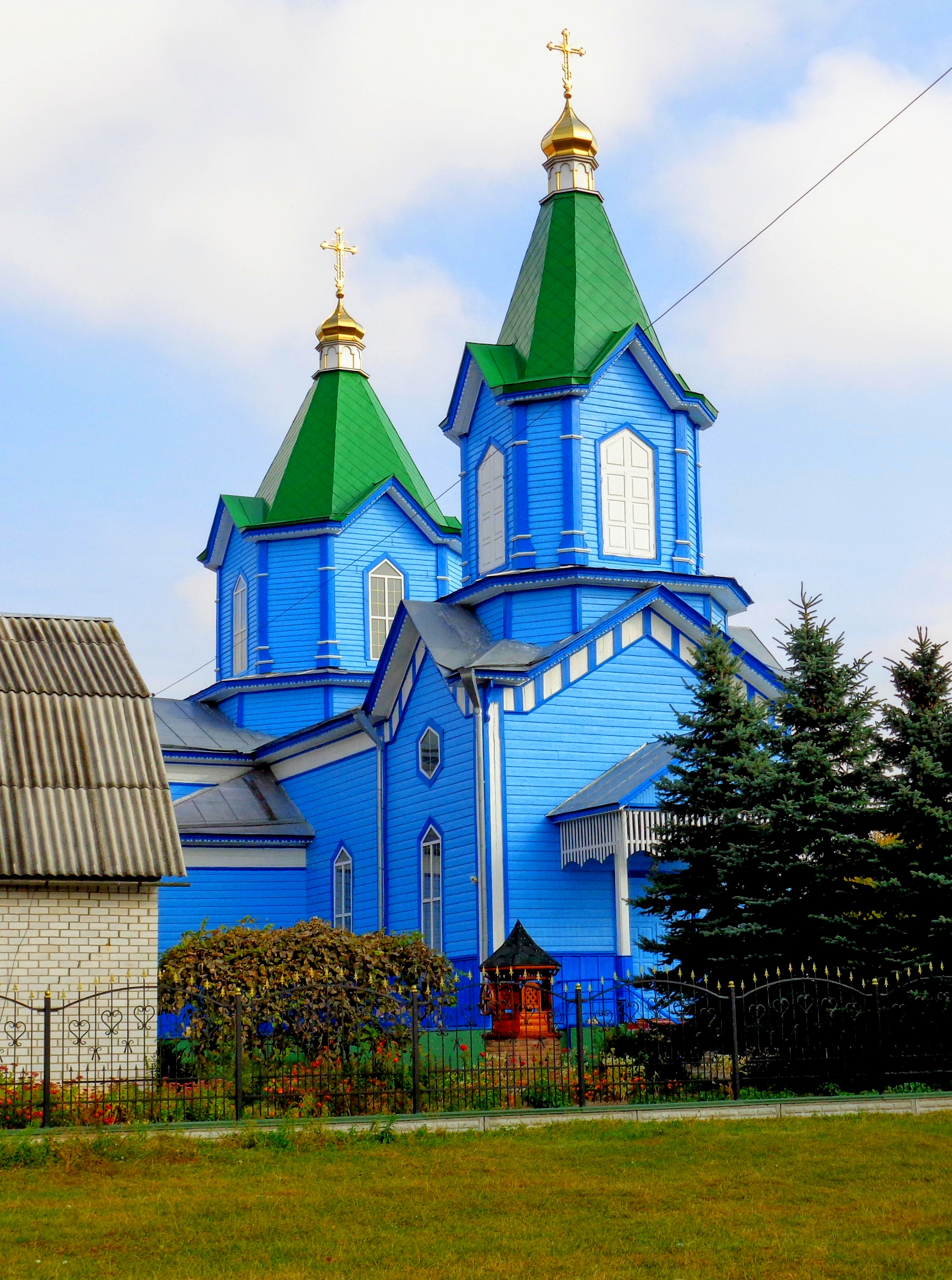
St. George's Church

St. George's Church (Ukrainian: Георгіївська церква) was a wooden Orthodox church in the village of Zavorychi, Brovary Raion, Kyiv Oblast, Ukraine.

== History ==
The church was built in 1873.

On 7 March 2022, during the 2022 Russian invasion of Ukraine, the church was destroyed by Russian forces.
