= Zavorychi =

Village in Kyiv Oblast, Ukraine

- Village
- Ukrainian: Заворичі
- Flag Coat of arms

- Location within Ukraine Location within Kyiv Oblast
- Coordinates: 50°42′20″N 31°7′58″E
- Country: Ukraine
- Oblast: Kyiv Oblast
- Raion: Brovary
- Population: 2,241

Zavorychi (Ukrainian: Заворичі) is a village in Brovary Raion (district) of Kyiv Oblast (province) in northern Ukraine. It belongs to Kalyta settlement hromada, one of the hromadas of Ukraine. The population was 2,241 at the 2001 Ukrainian census.

The settlement existed at least from 980s, the oldest mention under modern name dated back to 1618.

Local wooden Orthodox St. George's Church from 1873 was destroyed by Russian forces on March 7, 2022, during the 2022 Russian invasion of Ukraine.

== Links ==
- Media related to Zavorychi at Wikimedia Commons
