= Hoholiv =

Village in Kyiv Oblast, Ukraine

Hoholiv Гоголів
- Village
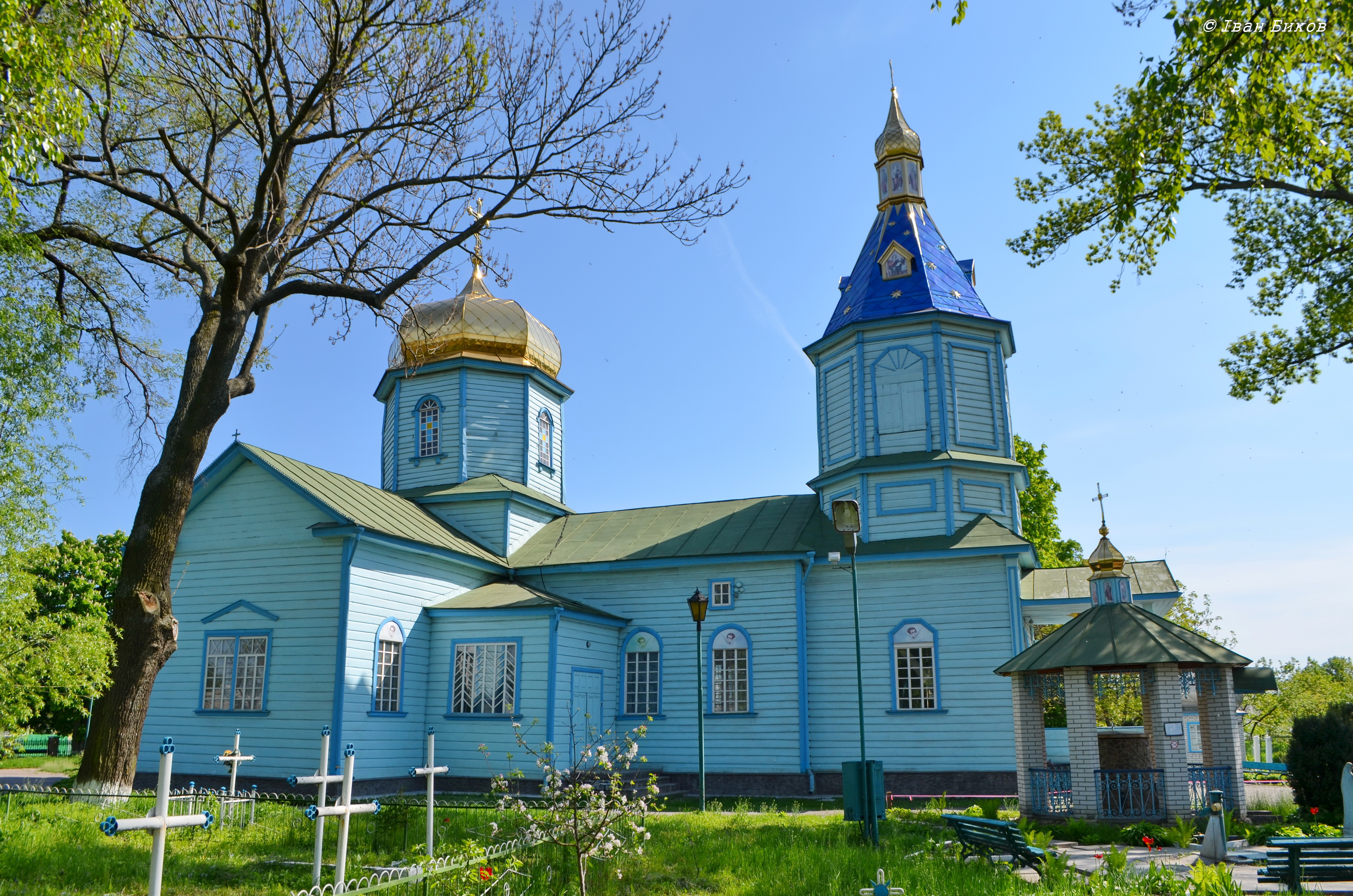
- The Church of the Nativity of the Virgin in Hoholiv

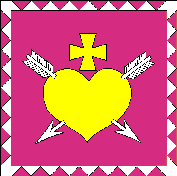
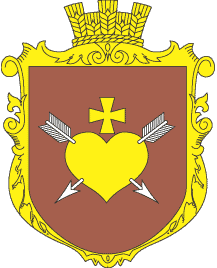
- Flag Coat of arms

- Location within Kyiv Oblast Location within Ukraine
- Country: Ukraine
- Oblast: Kyiv Oblast
- Raion: Brovary Raion
- First mentioned: 1148

Population (2023)
  - Total: 4,809
- Website: gogoliv.org (archived)

Hoholiv (Ukrainian: Гоголів) is a former Cossack town, and present-day village, in Brovary Raion, Kyiv Oblast of Ukraine. It belongs to Velyka Dymerka settlement hromada, one of the hromadas of Ukraine.

== History ==
Some historians trace the origins of the town to the town Nosov on the Rud river, mentioned in ancient Rus' chronicles around 1148 CE.

=== 17th to 19th centuries ===
Intensive development of the town began at the beginning of the 17th century when it was mentioned in the sources of Polish–Lithuanian Commonwealth under the name Chocholiw. At that time it was a big free Cossack town situated on the trade roots near Kyiv.

In 1649 Hoholiv Cossack sotnia (military troop of a hundred men) was formed to fight for freedom and civil liberties in the Cossack army of Bohdan Khmelnytsky.

After the incorporation of the lands of Cossack Hetmanate into the Tsardom of Russia in the second half of the 17th century chronicles of that period mention Cossack insurgency against the czarist government of that time near the village. A lot of people were killed by troops of the Muscovite Army who oppressed the insurgents.

During the 17th to 19th centuries, the town was part of the Russian Empire. Almost all citizens were registered in the imperial registry as Cossacks - that is more free than enslaved Cossack peasants, which constituted the majority of the Ukrainian population at that time.

=== 20th century ===
After the dissolution of the Russian Empire, the Russian Civil War, and the creation of the Soviet Ukraine, Hoholiv lost its status as a town and became a village.
