= 156th Mechanized Brigade =

Ukrainian Ground Forces unit

- 156-та окрема механізована бригада
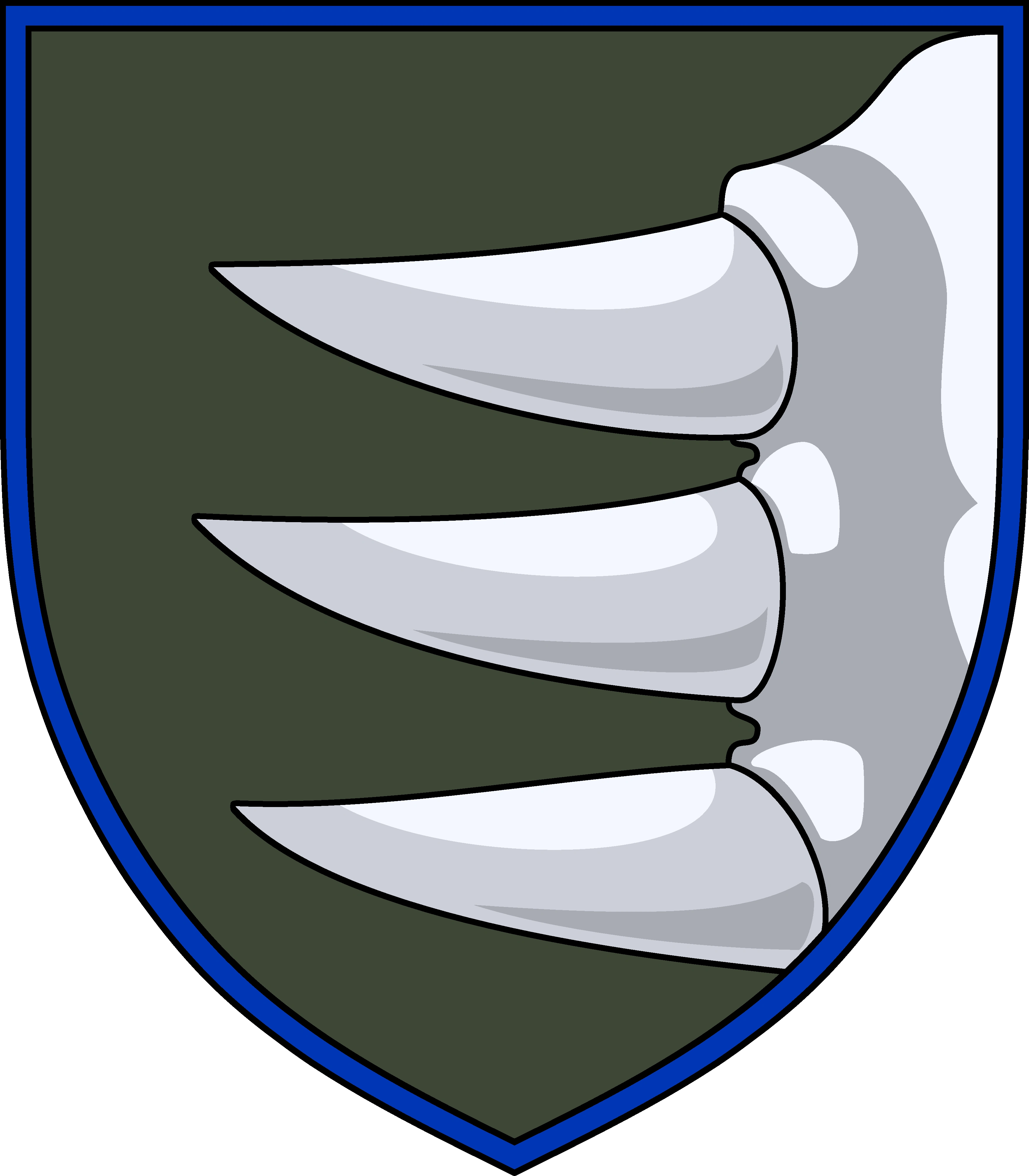
- Active: August 12, 2024 – present
- Country: Ukraine
- Allegiance: Armed Forces of Ukraine
- Branch: Ukrainian Ground Forces
- Type: Mechanized Infantry
- Size: Brigade
- Part of: Operational Command West: 18th Army Corps
- Garrison/HQ: Uzhhorod, Zakarpattia Oblast
- Engagements: Russo-Ukrainian war: Full scale invasion
- Website: Official Facebook page

Commanders
- Current commander: Col. Yuriy Hupalyuk

BM-21 Hrad of the Brigade launching rockets during training

The 156th Separate Mechanized Brigade (MUN A5003) is a unit of the Ukrainian Ground Forces.

== History ==
According to David Axe, as of October 2024, the 156th Brigade was one of fourteen 2,000-man brigades that had recently been formed by the Ukrainian Ground Forces. Most of these brigades, including the 156th, were formed as infantry brigades, but by October 2024, Ukrainian officials had announced the 156th would be upgraded to a mechanized brigade.

In January 2025, following the problems with mass desertions during the formation of the 155th Brigade, a special group of the General Staff headed by Colonel Oleh Apostol, Deputy Commander-in-Chief of the Armed Forces of Ukraine, began an inspection in the 156 Brigade and identified a number of significant shortcomings. The General Staff stated that mistakes that took place during the formation and training of the 155th have been taken into account, and measures are being taken to prevent them in the future.

== Structure ==
156th Mechanized Brigade
  - Brigade Headquarters
    - Command Platoon
    - Brigade Administration
  - 1st Mechanized Battalion
  - 2nd Mechanized Battalion
  - 3rd Mechanized Battalion
  - Motorized Battalion
  - Tank Battalion
  - Artillery Group
    - Headquarters and Target Acquisition Battery
    - Artillery divizion
    - Rocket Artillery Battery
    - Anti tank Company
  - Air Defence Battalion
  - Drone Battalion
  - Reconnaissance Company
  - Maintenance Battalion
  - Logistic Battalion
  - Control battalion
  - Engineering Company
  - Electronic Warfare Company
  - Medical Company
