= Berezan urban hromada =

Berezan urban hromada Березанська міська громада
- Hromada
- Seal
- Interactive map of Berezan urban hromada
- Country: Ukraine
- Oblast: Kyiv Oblast
- Raion: Brovary Raion
- Admin. center: Berezan

Area
  - Total: 210.2 km^{2} (81.2 sq mi)

Population (2020)
  - Total: 21,921
  - Density: 104.3/km^{2} (270.1/sq mi)
- Settlements: 10
- Cities: 1
- Villages: 9

Berezan urban hromada (Ukrainian: Березанська міська громада) is a hromada of Ukraine, located in Brovary Raion, Kyiv Oblast. Its administrative center is the city Berezan.

It has an area of 210.2 square kilometres (81.2 mi^{2}) and a population of 21,921, as of 2020.

The hromada contains 10 settlements: 1 city (Berezan), and 9 villages:

- Hryhorivka
- Dubove
- Lekhnivka
- Nedra
- Pylypche
- Sadove
- Khmeliovyk
- Yabluneve
- Yareshky

== See also ==
- List of hromadas of Ukraine
