= Brovary urban hromada =

Brovary urban hromada Броварська міська громада
- Hromada
- Interactive map of Brovary urban hromada
- Country: Ukraine
- Oblast: Kyiv Oblast
- Raion: Brovary Raion

Area
  - Total: 125.2 km^{2} (48.3 sq mi)

Population (2020)
  - Total: 119,573
  - Density: 955.1/km^{2} (2,474/sq mi)
- Settlements: 4
- Cities: 1
- Villages: 3

Brovary urban hromada (Ukrainian: Броварська міська громада) is a hromada of Ukraine, located in Brovary Raion, Kyiv Oblast. Its administrative center is the city Brovary.

It has an area of 125.2 square kilometres (48.3 mi^{2}) and a population of 119,573, as of 2020.

The hromada contains 4 settlements: 1 city (Brovary), and 3 villages:

- Kniazhychi
- Peremozhets
- Trebukhiv

== See also ==
- List of hromadas of Ukraine
