= Brovary railway station =

Railway station in Brovary, Ukraine

Brovary Бровари
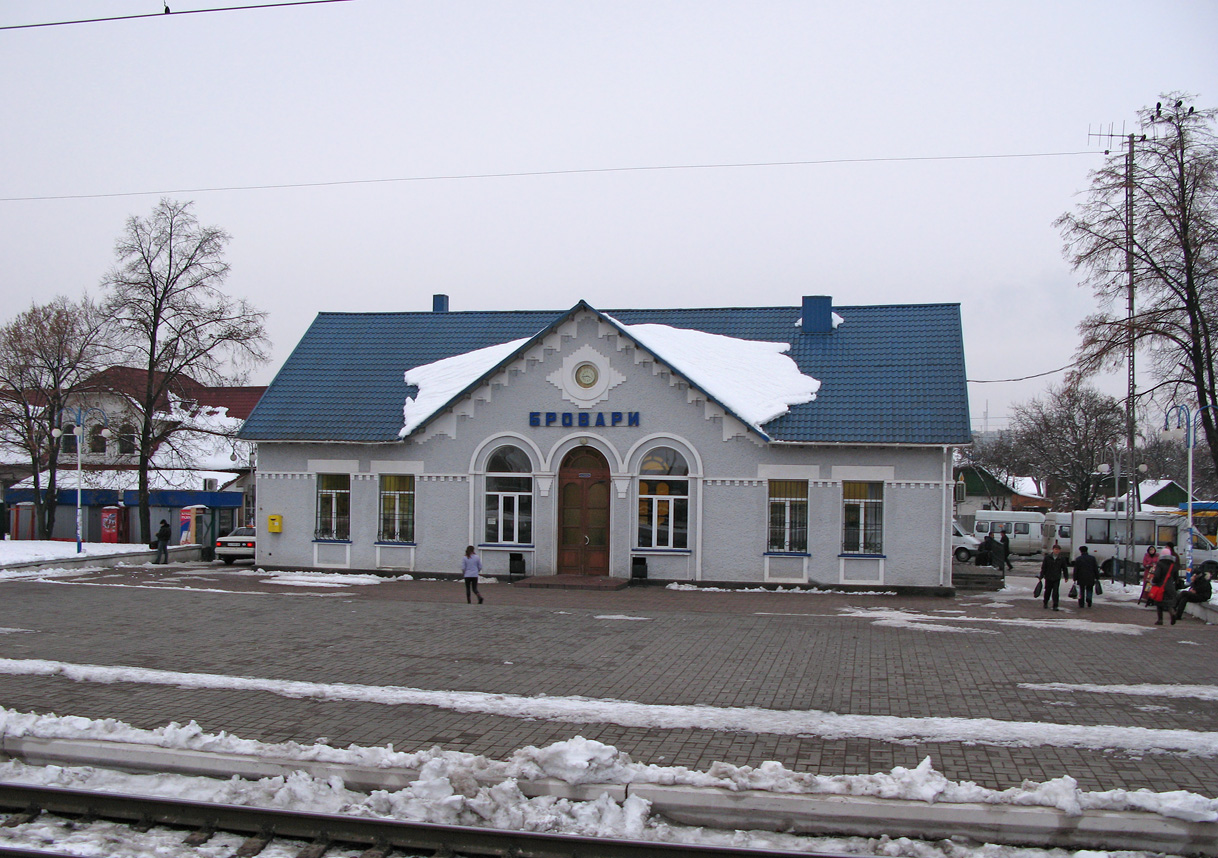
- Station Building

General information
- Coordinates: 50°30′51.8″N 30°48′47.1″E
- Owner: Southwestern Railways
- Platforms: 4
- Tracks: 2

History
- Opened: August 15, 1868

Services
Preceding station	Southwestern Railways	Following station
Knyazhichi towards Nizhyn	Nizhyn–Kyiv line	Kvitnevy towards Kyiv
Location

Brovary (Ukrainian: Бровари) is a railway station located in Brovary, Ukraine.
