= Zghurivka Raion =

Former subdivision of Kyiv Oblast, Ukraine

Zghurivka Raion Згурівський район
- Raion
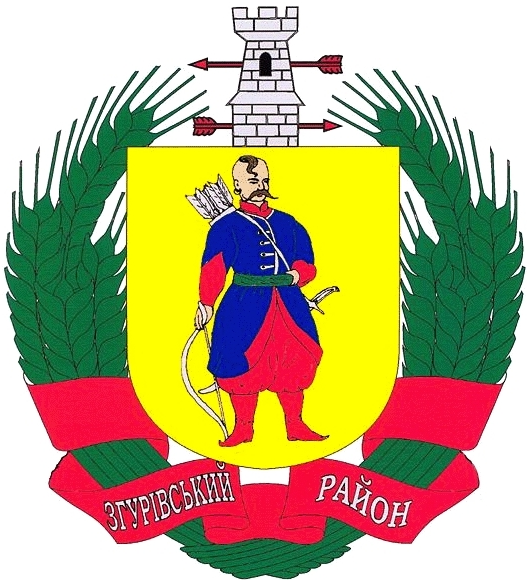
- Flag Coat of arms

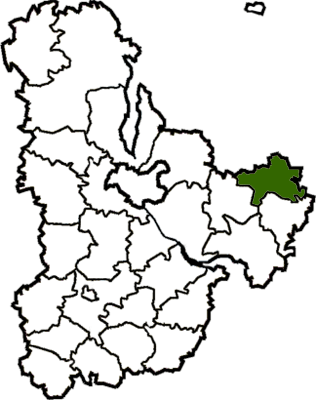
- Coordinates: 50°28′19″N 31°47′39″E
- Country: Ukraine
- Region: Kyiv Oblast
- Disestablished: 18 July 2020
- Admin. center: Zghurivka
- Subdivisions: List: — city councils; — settlement councils; — rural councils; Number of localities: — cities; — urban-type settlements; 40 — villages; — rural settlements

Population (2020)
  - Total: 15,503
- Time zone: UTC+02:00 (EET)
  - Summer (DST): UTC+03:00 (EEST)
- Area code: +380

Zghurivka Raion (Ukrainian: Згурівський район) was a raion (district) in Kyiv Oblast of Ukraine. Its administrative center was the urban-type settlement of Zghurivka. The raion was abolished on 18 July 2020 as part of the administrative reform of Ukraine, which reduced the number of raions of Kyiv Oblast to seven. The area of Zghurivka Raion was merged into Brovary Raion. The last estimate of the raion population was 15,503 (2020 est.).

At the time of disestablishment, the raion consisted of one hromada, Zghurivka settlement hromada with the administration in Zghurivka.
