= 47th Artillery Brigade =

- 47 окрема артилерійська бригада імені Семена Лощенка
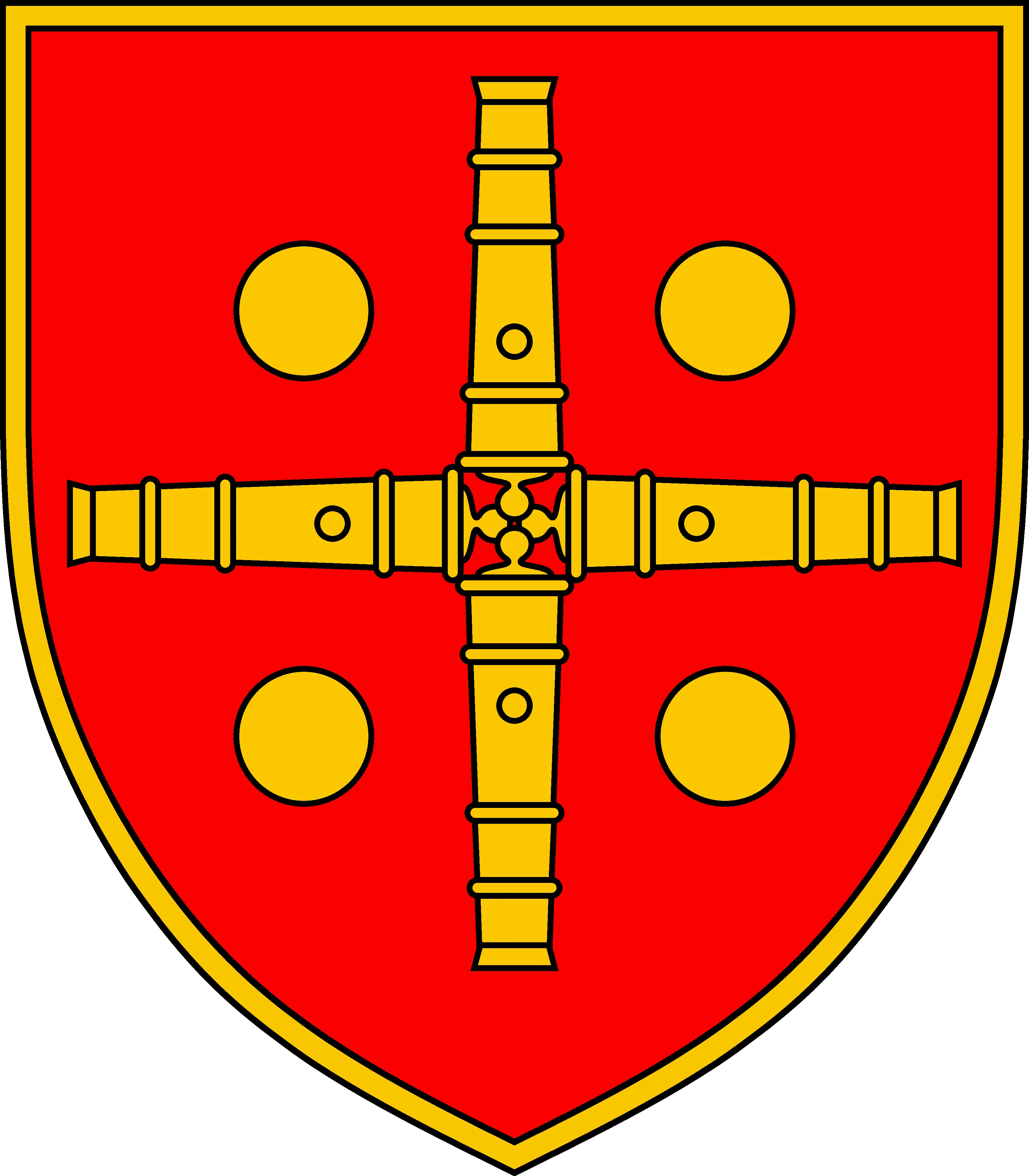
- Founded: 2022
- Country: Ukraine
- Allegiance: Armed Forces of Ukraine
- Branch: Ukrainian Ground Forces
- Type: Rocket and Artillery Forces
- Role: Field artillery
- Size: Brigade
- Part of: Operational Command East; 18th Army Corps
- Garrison/HQ: Kharkiv
- Nickname: Semen Loshhenko Brigade
- Patron: Semen Matvijovych Loshhenko
- Mottos: Find and destroy
- Engagements: Russo-Ukrainian War; Russian invasion of Ukraine
- Decorations: For Courage and Bravery
- Website: Official Facebook page

Commanders
- Current commander: Colonel Artem Ahatiy

The 47th Separate Artillery Brigade named after Semyon Loschenko (MUN A7113) is a brigade level military unit of the Ukrainian Ground Forces, a part of the 18th Army Corps and operationally subordinated to the Operational Command East. The Brigade was established in October 2022 and is based in Kharkiv.

== History ==
It was established in October 2022 amidst the Russian invasion of Ukraine and was fully staffed by January 2023. Soldier Kalinichenko Andriy Mykolayovych, a driver-electrician of an artillery battery of the brigade was killed in action on 14 November 2022.

In June 2023, the brigade carried out strikes against Russian forces in the area of Velyka Novoselka, destroying a Russian 2S3 Akatsiya self-propelled artillery piece. It also discovered a and destroyed a Russian BM-27 Uragan 220mm MLRS using French CAESAR self-propelled howitzer. On 7 July 2023, its forces destroyed a Russian Tornado MLRS using an M142 HIMARS. On 2 September 2023, the brigade received commendation from Volodymyr Zelenskyy for its defensive operations in Zaporizhzhia Oblast, Donetsk Oblast and Sumy Oblast. In December 2023, its forces were operating along the frontlines. In February 2024, the brigade was utilizing 2S22 Bohdana to strike Russian positions.

In March 2024, its equipment was protected with nets against the constant threat of kamikaze drones. In August 2024, its forces struck and destroyed a Russian tank. On 14 August 2024, its forces struck and destroyed a Russian ammunition transport vehicle. In November 2024, a soldier of the brigade, Vyacheslav Puntus was killed in action. In late December 2024, a soldier of the brigade, Serhiy Lastivka was killed in combat along the frontlines. On 8 February 2025, its forces destroyed a Russian cannon and a field ammunition depot.

On 23 February 2026 the unit was awarded the Presidential Award For Courage and Bravery by the President of Ukraine Volodymyr Zelenskyy.

On 7 April 2026 the unit was awarded the honoary title named after Semen Loshhenko by President Volodymyr Zelenskyy.

== Equipment ==
Model	Image	Origin	Type	Number	Details
Artillery
152 mm howitzer 2A65 Msta-B		Soviet Union	152.4 mm howitzer artillery	5+	
2A36 Giatsint-B		Soviet Union	152mm Field gun	10+	
MT-12 Rapira		Soviet Union	100-mm anti-tank gun		
M142 HIMARS		United States	Light multiple rocket launcher		
2S22 Bohdana		Ukraine	155 mm self-propelled howitzer	4+	
CAESAR		France	155 mm self-propelled howitzer		
Armored vehicles
BRDM-2		Soviet Union	Amphibious armoured reconnaissance vehicle		
Transport vehicles
Volkswagen Transporter (T4)		Germany	Light commercial vehicle		
Unmanned Aerial Vehicle
DJI Mavic		China	FPV drone		

== Structure ==
47th Artillery Brigade

  - Unit Headquarters commandant Platoon
  - 1st Artillery Division
  - 2nd Artillery Division
  - 3rd Artillery Division
  - 4th Artillery Division
  - Artillery Reconnaissance Battalion
  - Engineering Company
  - Maintenance Company
  - Logistical support Company
  - Signal Company
  - Radar Company
  - Medical Company
  - CBRN Protection Company

== See also ==
- 15th Artillery Reconnaissance Brigade
- 55th Artillery Brigade
