= Kalyta =

Rural locality in Kyiv Oblast, Ukraine

Kalyta Калита
- Rural settlement
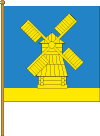
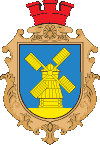
- Flag Coat of arms

- Location of Kalyta in Ukraine Kalyta (Ukraine)
- Coordinates: 50°45′01″N 31°01′35″E
- Country: Ukraine
- Oblast: Kyiv Oblast
- Raion: Brovary Raion
- Founded: 1600
- Town status: 1973

Government
  - Town Head: Stanislav Moroz

Area
  - Total: 11.27 km^{2} (4.35 sq mi)

Population (2001)
  - Total: 4,982
  - Density: 442.1/km^{2} (1,145/sq mi)
- Time zone: UTC+2 (EET)
  - Summer (DST): UTC+3 (EEST)
- Postal code: 07420
- Area code: +380 4594
- Website: rada.gov.ua

Kalyta (Ukrainian: Калита) is a rural settlement in Brovary Raion (district) of Kyiv Oblast (province) in northern Ukraine. It hosts the administration of Kalyta settlement hromada, one of the hromadas of Ukraine. Kalyta's population was 4,982 as of the 2001 Ukrainian Census. Current population: 4,716 (2022 estimate).

== History ==
The town of Kalyta is said to have been founded in 1600, although the first written mention of the town dates Kalyta to 1628, seen in an old Polish illustration. During the middle of the 17th century, the local organization of the Elected Cossacks were based in Kalyta.

Until 26 January 2024, Kalyta was designated urban-type settlement. On this day, a new law entered into force which abolished this status, and Kalyta became a rural settlement.

== Symbol ==
Kalyta was settled on a raised landscape, which allowed the town's inhabitants to build windmills which would produce grain for all of the nearby settlements. At the turn of the 20th century, townsfolk stated that there was a total of 62 windmills in Kalyta. The town's coat of arms, respectfully, features a windmill.
