= Litky, Kyiv Oblast =

Rural locality in Kyiv Oblast, Ukraine

Litky
- Village
- Ukrainian: Літки
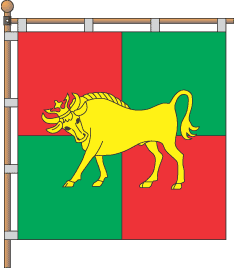
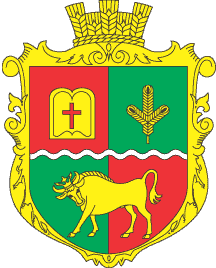
- Flag Coat of arms

- Location within Ukraine Location within Kyiv Oblast
- Coordinates: 50°43′N 30°46′E
- Country: Ukraine
- Oblast: Kyiv Oblast
- Raion: Brovary Raion
- Hromada: Zazymia rural hromada
- Population: 2,149
- Website: Unofficial site

Lítky (Ukrainian: Літки), in ancient times Litkovychi (Ukrainian: Літковичі, Velyki Litkovychi, Velyki Litky) is a Ukrainian selo, (a market town from the 17th century to 1923) (Note: The exact date is unknown.) located on the Desna River in Brovary Raion (district) of Kyiv Oblast (province), 29 km (18 mi) to north east from the Ukrainian capital, Kyiv. It belongs to Zazymia rural hromada, one of the hromadas of Ukraine.

== History ==
It is believed that Litkovychi with neighboring Zazymia were founded in 1128 by Vsevolod Gorodetsky (Prince of Oster, son-in-law of Grand Prince of Kyiv Vladimir II Monomakh, husband of his daughter Ahafiya). The first recorded mention of Litkovychi in the historical sources was written in 1426.

During the times of the Grand Duchy of Lithuania and the Polish–Lithuanian Commonwealth, Litky was a nobility residence of Ukrainian boyars and Polish szlachta in Oster Starostwo and called 'Little Oster'. After the Khmelnytsky Uprising it was known as a market town.

After 1664 the market town came under the power of the Vydubychi Monastery. On 10 February 1687, Theodosius Uglytsky founded in St. Nicholas Church of Litkovychi the Brotherhood and Guild. The guild first consisted of blacksmiths, coopers, and saddlers. Brotherhood and Guild had symbols and traditions.

Litky is the birthplace of Vasyl Hryhorovych-Barskyi (Ukrainian 18th-century writer, scholar, traveler), his famous brother-architect Ivan Hryhorovych-Barskyi and Sofia Punko-Chumachenko (mother-in-law of Ukrainian President Victor Yuschenko).

On 28 August 1911, Tsar Nicholas II visited Litky and received a gift — boots — from the local masters. In response, the Shoe Guild received an award from the Tsar — the gold watch.
