= Zazymia rural hromada =

Zazymia rural hromada Зазимська селищна громада
- Hromada
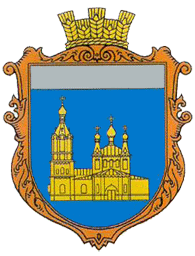
- Seal
- Interactive map of Zazymia rural hromada
- Country: Ukraine
- Oblast: Kyiv
- Raion: Brovary

Area
  - Total: 255.8 km^{2} (98.8 sq mi)

Population (2020)
  - Total: 9,190
  - Density: 35.9/km^{2} (93.0/sq mi)
- Settlements: 7
- Villages: 7

Zazymia rural hromada (Ukrainian: Зазимська селищна громада) is a hromada of Ukraine, located in Brovary Raion, Kyiv Oblast. Its administrative center is the village of Zazymia.

It has an area of 255.8 square kilometres (98.8 mi^{2}) and a population of 9,190, as of 2020.

The hromada contains 7 settlements, which are all villages:

- Zazymia
- Litky
- Litochky
- Pohreby
- Pukhivka
- Rozhny
- Sobolivka

== See also ==
- List of hromadas of Ukraine
