= Shevchenkove, Brovary Raion, Kyiv Oblast =

Village in Kyiv Oblast, Ukraine

Shevchenkove Шевченкове
- Village
- Flag Coat of arms
- Interactive map of Shevchenkove
- Location within Kyiv Oblast
- Coordinates: 50°38′44″N 31°02′42″E
- Country: Ukraine
- Oblast: Kyiv Oblast
- District: Brovary Raion
- Established: 1654

Area
  - Total: 443 km^{2} (171 sq mi)
- Elevation /(average value of): 110 m (360 ft)

Population
  - Total: 2,913
  - Density: 6.58/km^{2} (17.0/sq mi)
- Time zone: UTC+2 (EET)
  - Summer (DST): UTC+3 (EEST)
- Postal code: 07434
- Area code: +380 4594

Shevchenkove (Ukrainian: Шевченкове) is a village in Brovary Raion, Kyiv Oblast, Ukraine, at about 43.9 kilometres (27.3 mi) northeast by east from the centre of Kyiv city. It belongs to Velyka Dymerka settlement hromada, one of the hromadas of Ukraine.

On 1 April 2022, the Ukrainian military announced that its forces had restored control over Shevchenkove, following a Russian withdrawal from the area.
