= Berezan, Kyiv Oblast =

City in Kyiv Oblast, Ukraine

Berezan Березань
- City
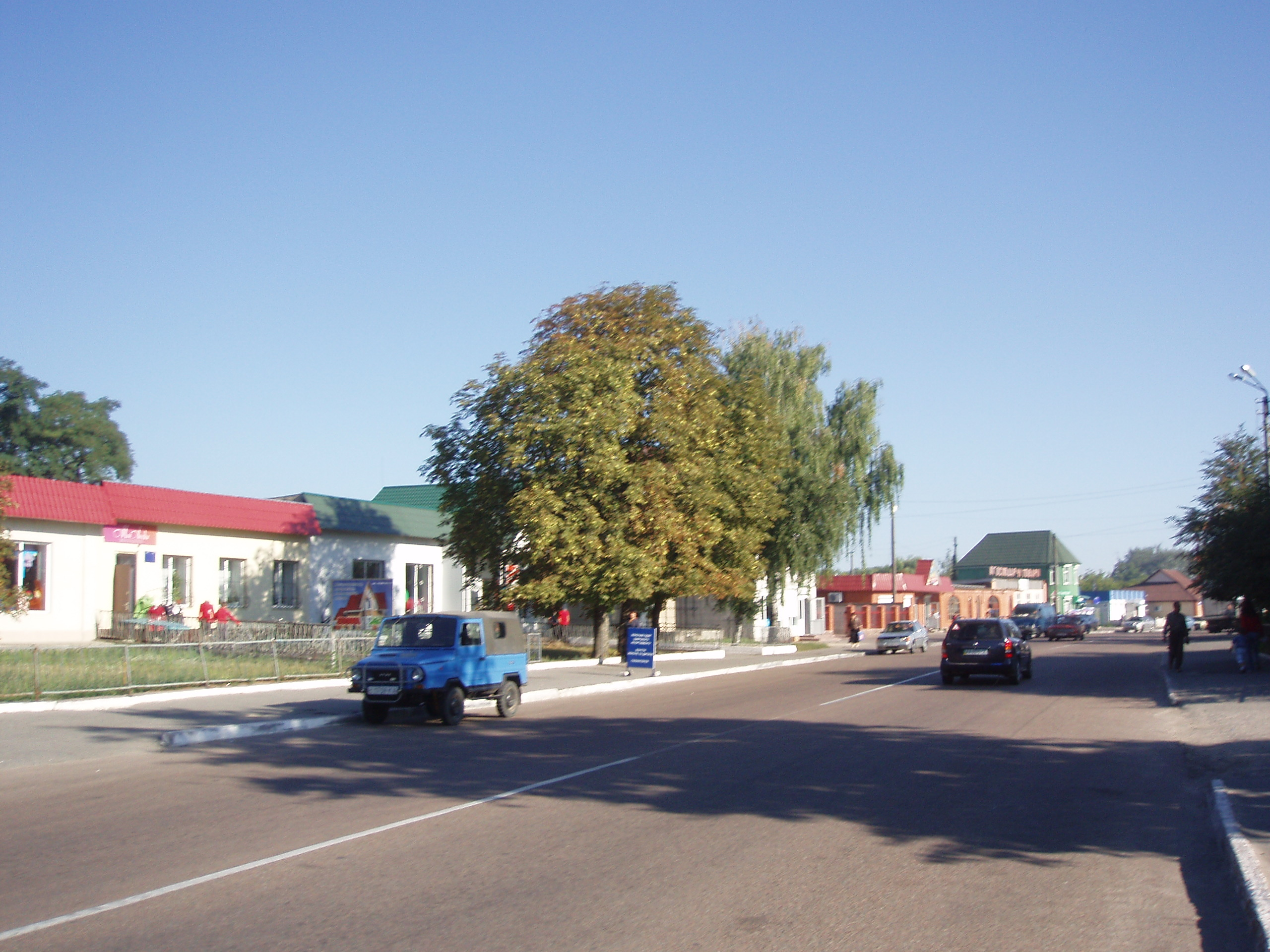
- The center of Berezan

- Flag Coat of arms
- Interactive map of Berezan
- Location within Ukraine
- Coordinates: 50°19′11″N 31°28′12″E
- Country: Ukraine
- Oblast: Kyiv Oblast
- Raion: Brovary Raion
- Hromada: Berezan urban hromada
- First reference: 1616
- Incorporated (town): 1981

Government
  - Mayor: Volodymyr Tymchenko

Area
  - Land: 32.92 km^{2} (12.71 sq mi)

Population (2022)
  - Total: 16,047
- Postal code: 07540 — 07543
- Area code: +380 4576
- Website: http://www.berezan.com.ua

Berezan (Ukrainian: Березань, IPA: [bereˈzɑnʲ]; Polish: Berezań; Yiddish: בערעזאַן; Russian: Березань) is a city in Brovary Raion, Kyiv Oblast (region) of Ukraine. It hosts the administration of Berezan urban hromada, one of the hromadas of Ukraine. Population: 16,047 (2022 estimate).

There is an important railway junction in the city. By rail, the distance to Kyiv is 65 km.

== History ==
Berezań was first mentioned in Kyiv Voivodeship chronicles in 1616.

According to the main version, the name Berezań comes from the name of the Berezanka river that runs near the city. Similar to another river that is also close to the town of Cuchoberezica. These rivers are named after natural conditions. On the banks of the river Berazanka there are birch forests (Brzozy in Ukrainian: Bereza). At Suchoberezice - dry shores. Now, in the past, Berezanka is called Nadra. In the lustration from 1620 it is written that in the towns of the Perejasław starosty, Berezani, Byków, Jabłonowo and Myrgorod, celit is produced, which brings abundant income annually. The files of the Lublin Tribunal from the end of the 16th and beginning of the 17th centuries inform that Berezań actively accepted refugees from right-bank Ukraine, mostly from Chodorków.

The files of the Lublin Tribunal from the end of the 16th and beginning of the 17th centuries indicate that Berezań actively accepted refugees from the right-bank of Ukraine, mostly from Chodorków.

In the first half of the 17th century, before the Chmielnicki uprising, until 1620 Berezań was the town of the Perejasław starosty and belonged to Janusz Ostrowski. After his death, the towns of Berezań, Byków, Jabłonów, Myrgorod, formerly separated from the Perejasław starosty and by order of Sigismund III Vasa, were handed over to Jan Czernyszewski for the production of celite.

In 1621, by another royal order, the production of celite in the Kyiv province and throughout Ukraine was transferred to the bailiff Bartłomiej Obałkowski. In the 1630s, Berezań becomes the center of the Berezan Cossacks' Hundred of the Perejasław Regiment. At the very beginning of the Chmielnicki uprising, the hetman turned to Prince Jeremia Wiszniowiecki, who was then standing in a camp near Berezan. The messengers brought the prince a letter from Chmielnicki in which he explained the reasons for the insurrection and encouraged Wiśniowiecki not to engage in fights between the Ukrainian Cossacks and the Polish Crown troops.

In 1674, Hetman Ivan Samoilovych, with his universal, handed over Pereyaslav colonel Dmytrashko-Raicha the lands he had already bought, including the town of Berezan.

In 1688, another hetman, Ivan Mazepa, once again confirmed with his order the right to the ownership by Raicha. According to a list of estates, which was drawn up in all ten regiments of left-bank Ukraine in the years 1729–1731, there were 37 manors in Berezan and it was owned by the family of Colonel Dmytrashko-Raicha.

In 1764, the Pereyaslav regiment, which included the hundred of Berezan, was incorporated into the newly created Ukrainian governorates. After the liquidation of the regimental system in left-bank Ukraine and the reorganization of the Ukrainian administration into the Kyiv, Chernihiv and Novgorod-Siwerski viceroyalties in 1782, Berezan was included in the Pereyaslav district of the Kyiv Viceroyalty.

In 1796, the governorate system was re-established, so Berezan became part of the Pereyaslav county until its division in 1802 into Chernigov and Poltava governorates.

From 1802, Berezań belonged to the Pereyaslav district of the Poltava Governorate. As a result of another administrative reform in the years 1922–1923, when povits were converted into districts, Berezan became a local center of the Kyiv district. In 1932, after the districts were liquidated, Berezan became a district center of the newly formed Kyiv region.

From 1962 to 1965, the town of Berezan was part of Pereyaslav-Khmelnytskyi district of Kyiv region. In 1994, Berezan was transferred to the category of cities of regional importance of Kyiv region.

In 1843, well-known poet and painter Taras Shevchenko visited Berezan, where he wrote his work "Dug up grave".

in 1927, in the city of Berezan, director Arnold Kurdiuk made one of the first full-length films, "Jamalma".

Until 18 July 2020, Berezan was incorporated as a city of oblast significance. In July 2020, as part of the administrative reform in Ukraine, which reduced the number of raions of Kyiv Oblast to seven, the city of Berezan was merged into Brovary Raion.

== Geography ==
The climate is temperate-continental, with a warm summer that lasts, and sometimes moderately unstable winters, with little snowfall. The soil is mostly black earth, fertile, there is little lime, slate and sun. The city is surrounded by coniferous and mixed forests, birch groves. The town is rich in water resources: two rivers Nedra and Trubiż-prytoki dnieper, numerous ponds and the Central Lake. There are layers of peat and clay suitable for the production of brick, fine-grained sands, sources of mineral water, from which beer was previously produced.

== Gallery ==
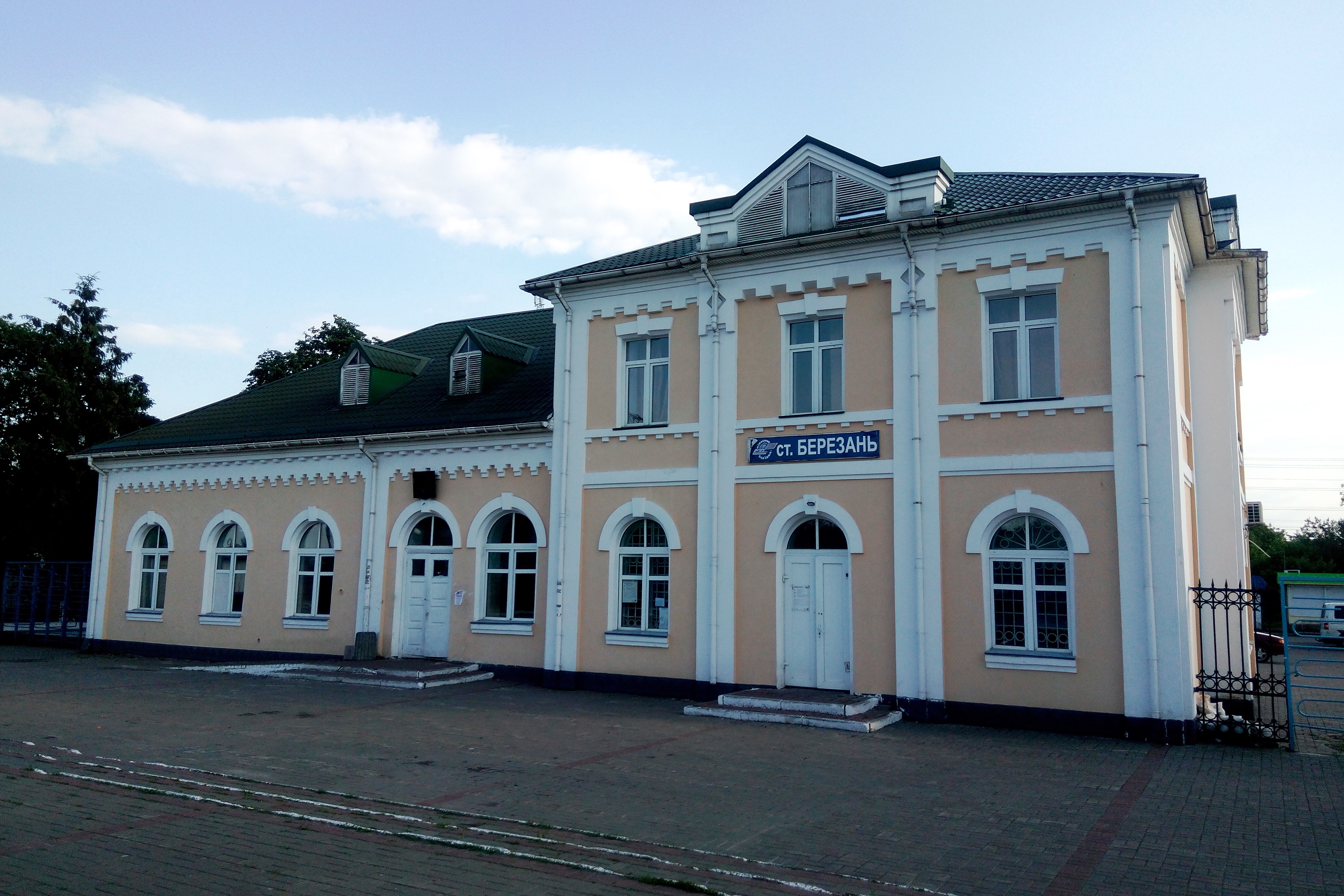
Berezan railway station

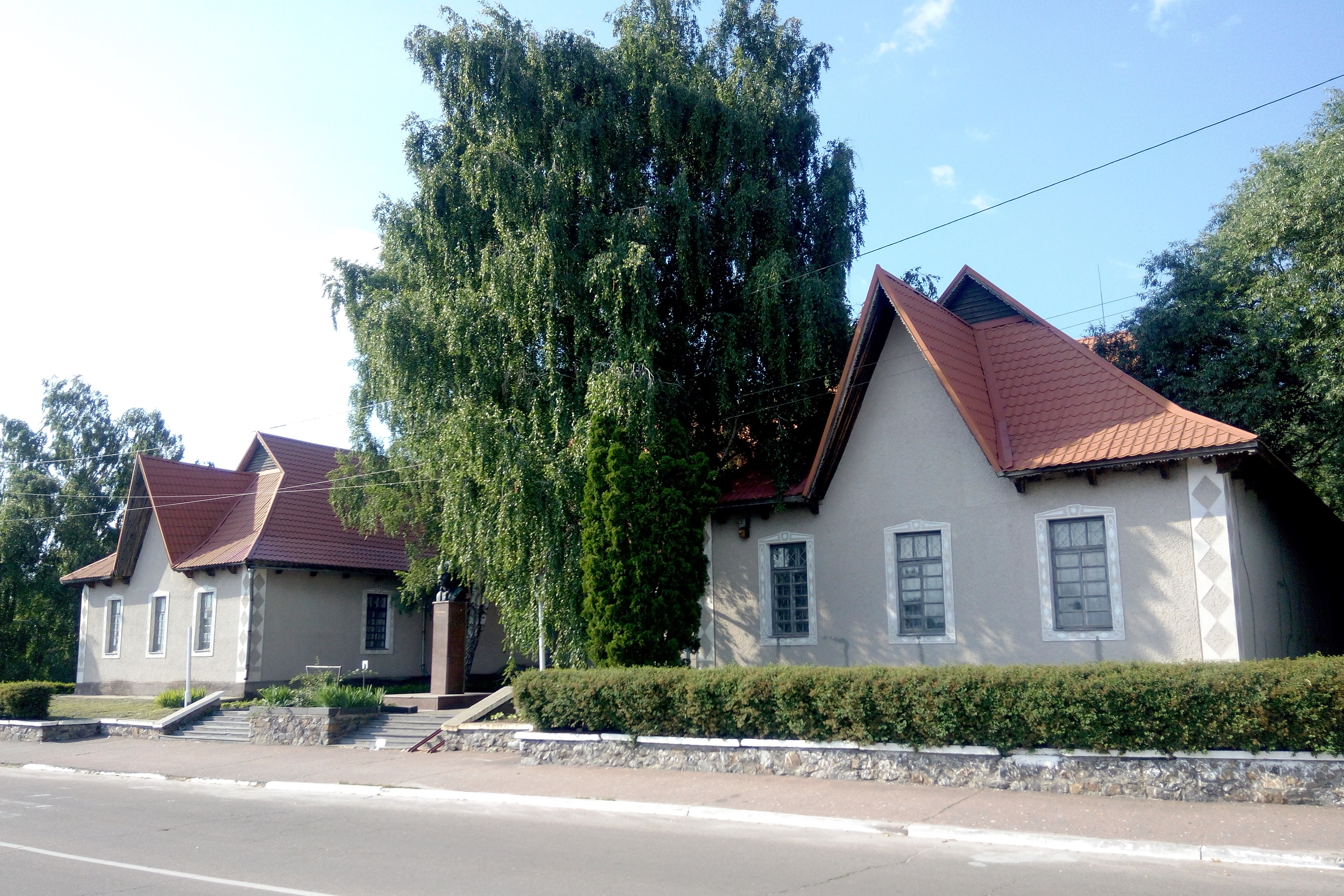
Local museum

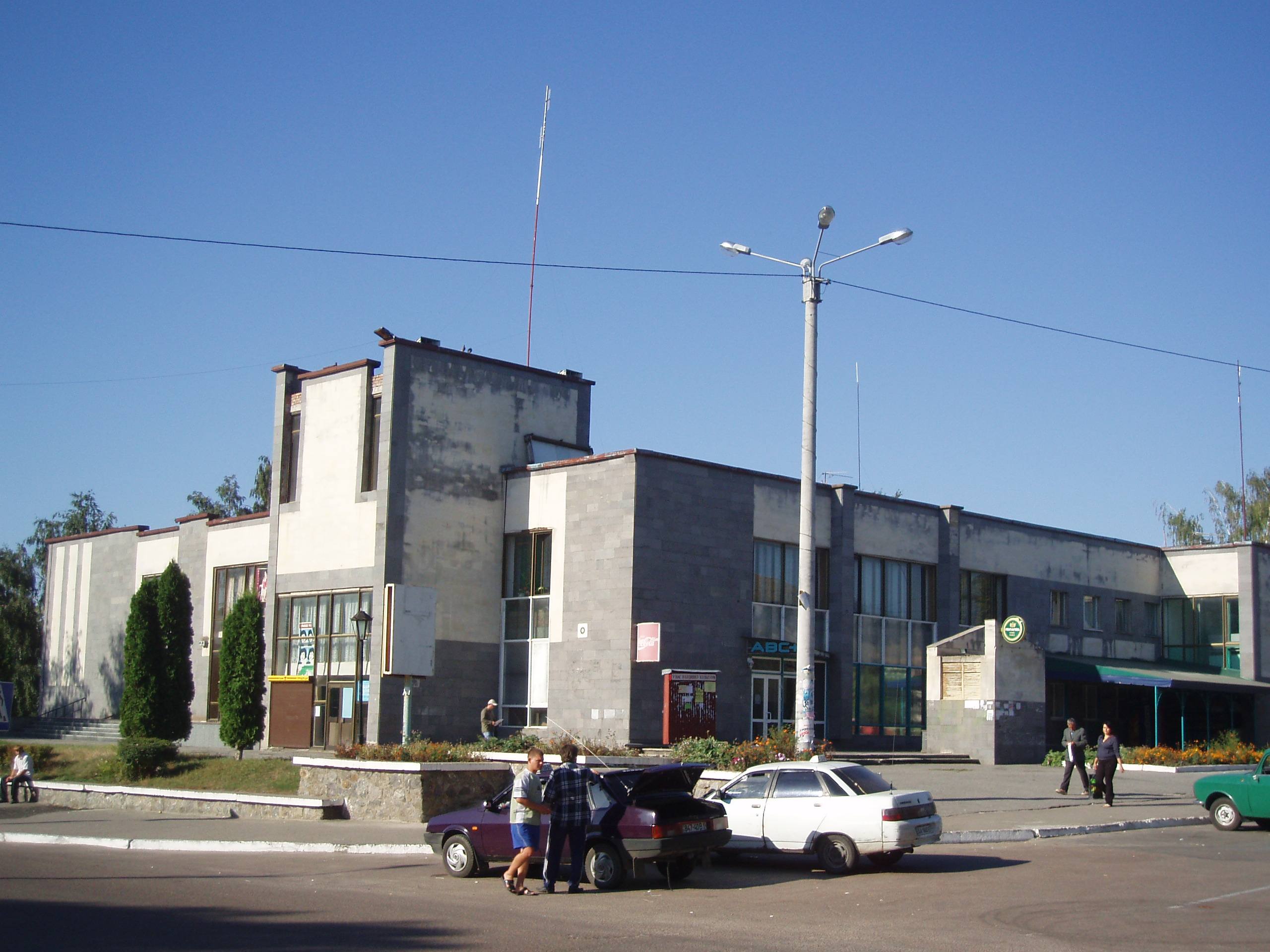
Berezan House of Culture

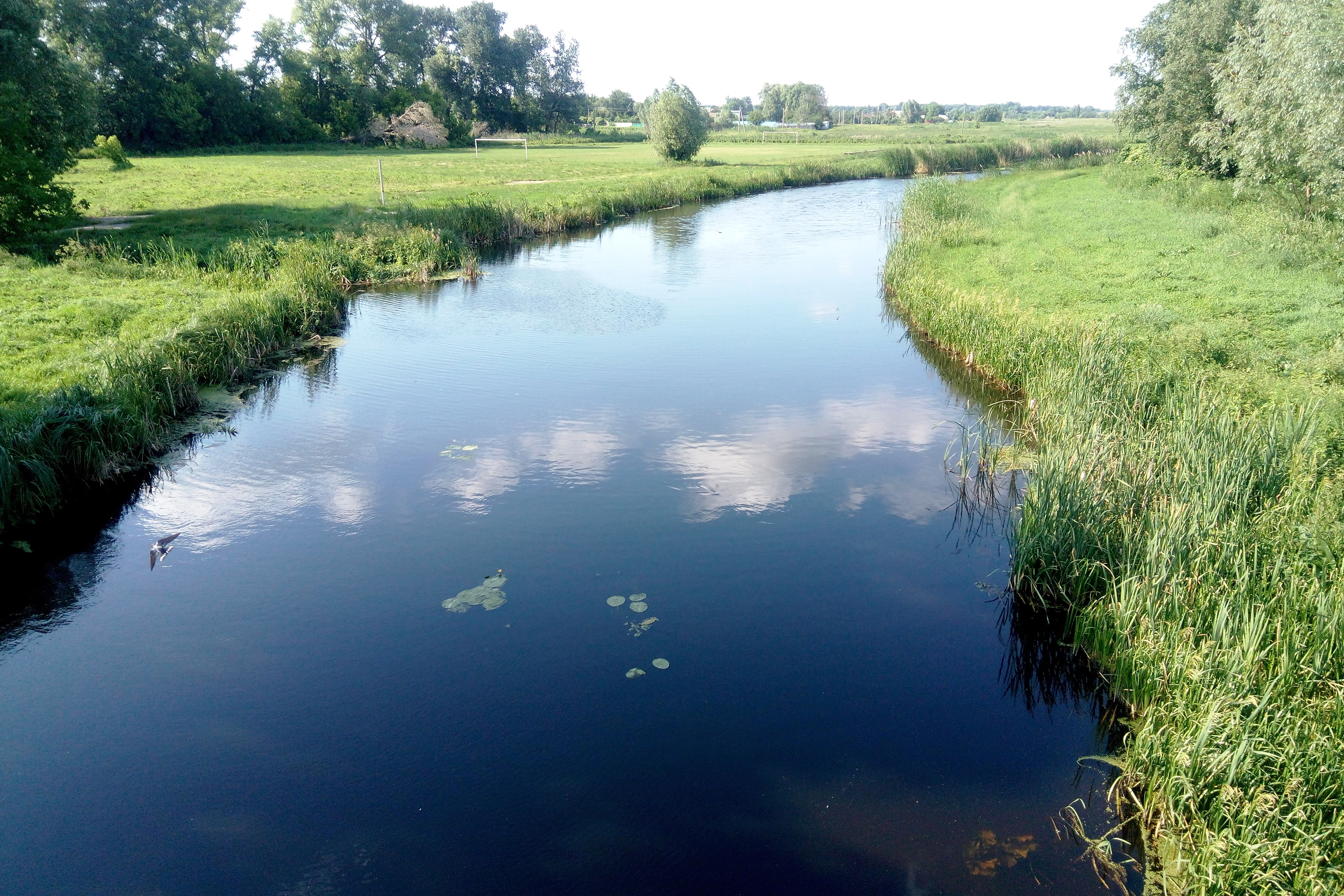
Nedra river in Berezan

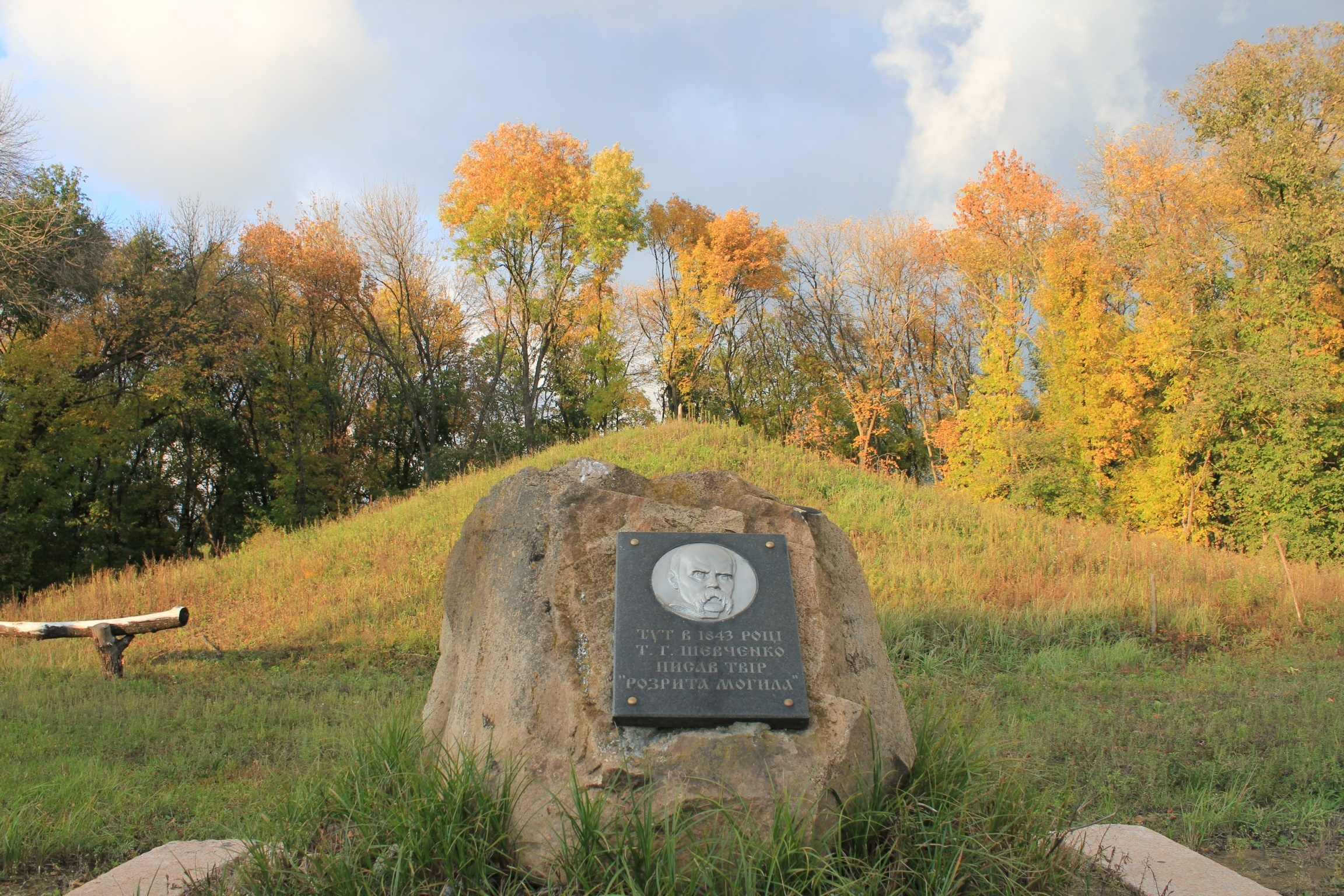
Taras Shevchenko memorial mound

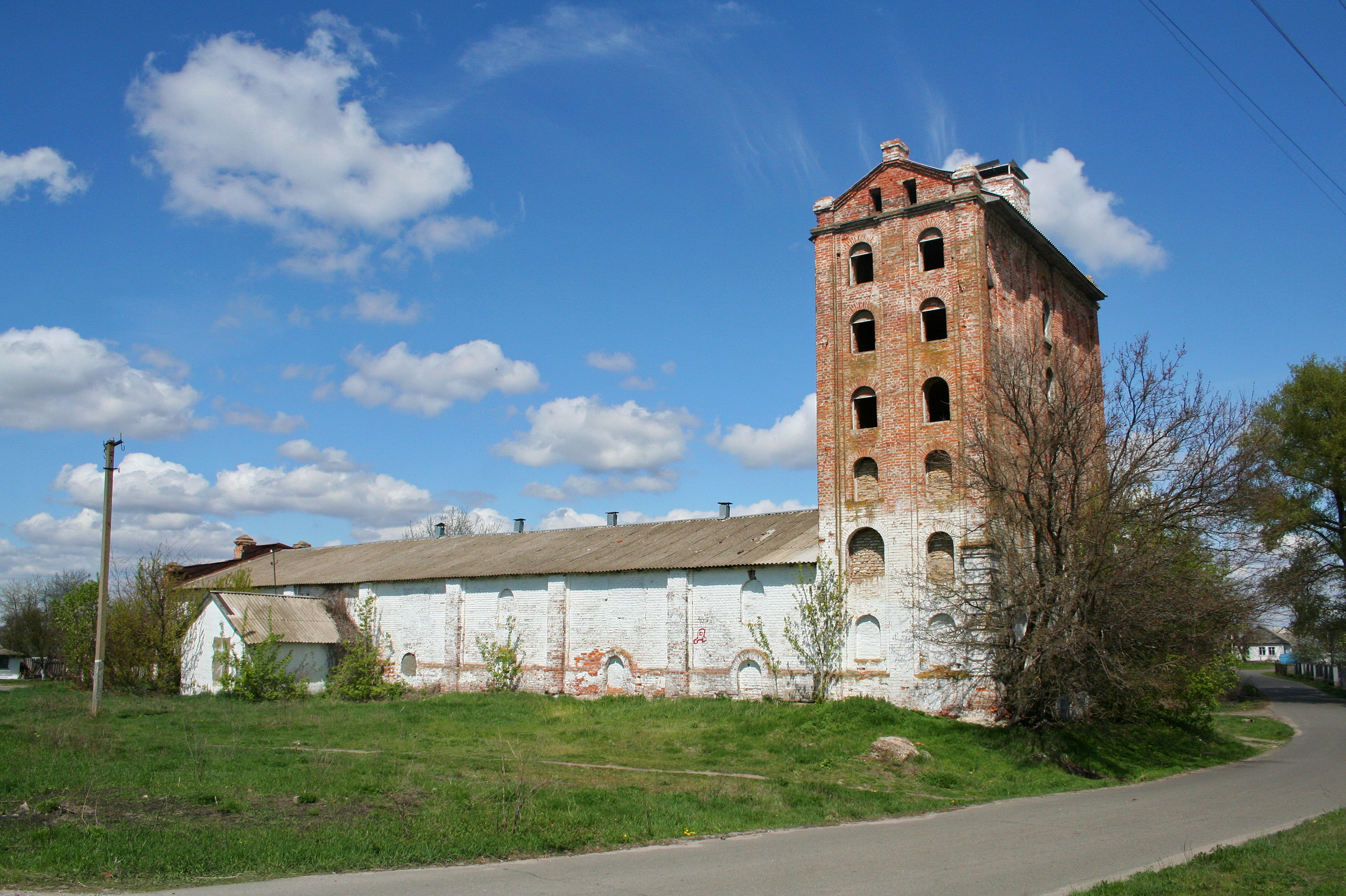
Old brewery
