= Zghurivka =

Rural locality in Kyiv Oblast, Ukraine

Zghurivka Згурівка
- Rural settlement
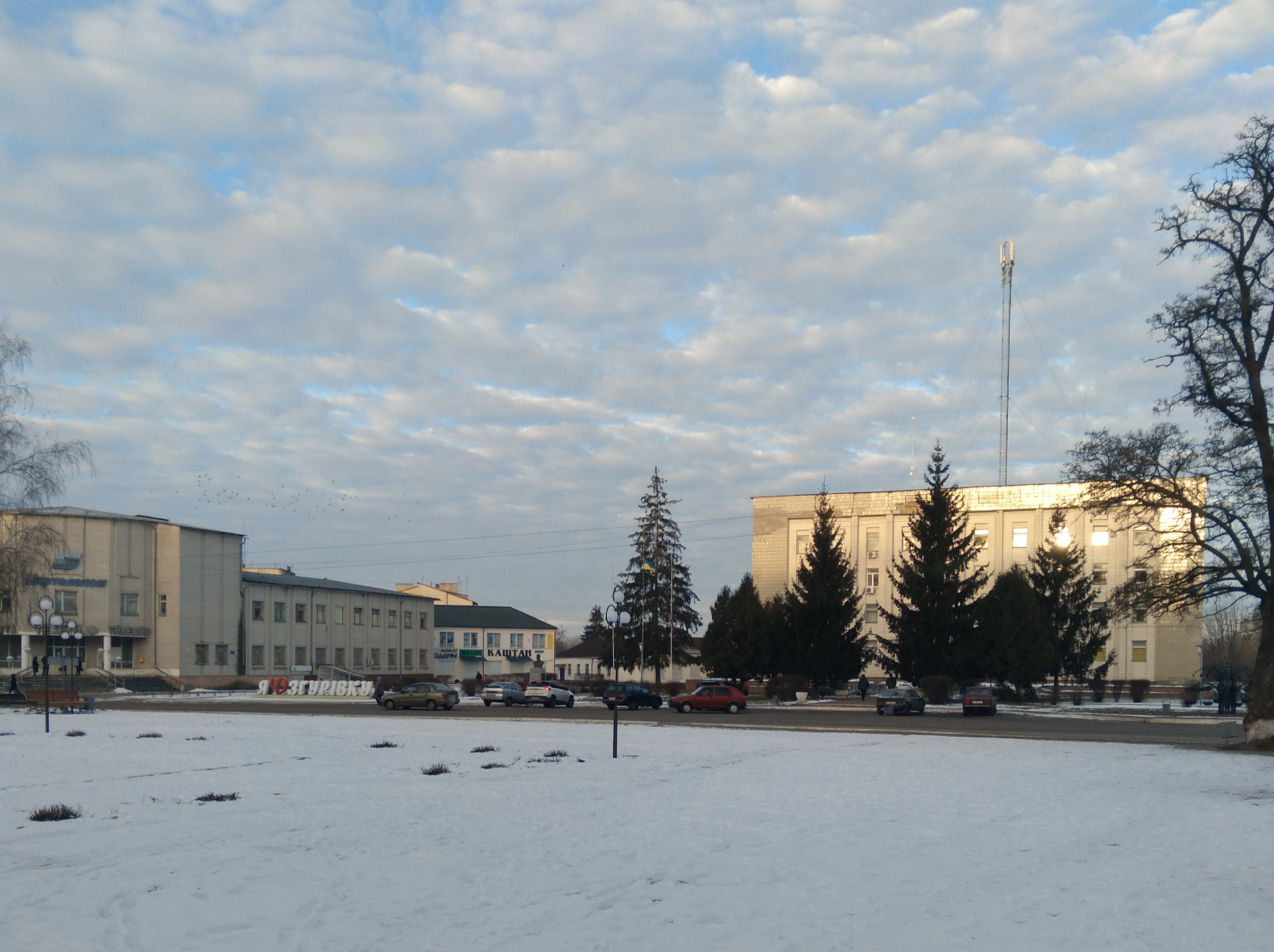
- Zghurivka Center in early 2023

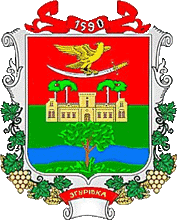
- Coat of arms

- Location within Kyiv Oblast Location within Ukraine
- Coordinates: 50.497594°N 31.773917°E
- Country: Ukraine
- Oblast: Kyiv Oblast
- Raion: Brovary Raion
- Hromada: Zghurivka settlement hromada

Population
  - Estimate (2022): 4,868
- Time zone: UTC+2 (EET)
  - Summer (DST): UTC+3 (EEST)
- Postal Code: 07600

Zghurivka or Zhurivka (Ukrainian: Згурівка, Ukrainian pronunciation: [zˈɦurʲiu̯kɐ]; Russian: Згуровка) is a rural settlement in Brovary Raion, Kyiv Oblast, Ukraine. It hosts the administration of Zghurivka settlement hromada, one of the hromadas of Ukraine. Population: 4,868 (2022 estimate). In 2001, population was 6,615.

== Geography ==
Zghurivka is located on the Supiy river in the Dnieper Lowland.

== History ==
Until 18 July 2020, Zghurivka was the administrative center of Zghurivka Raion. The raion was abolished that day as part of the administrative reform of Ukraine, which reduced the number of raions of Kyiv Oblast to seven. The area of Zghurivka Raion was merged into Brovary Raion.

Until 26 January 2024, Zghurivka was designated urban-type settlement. On this day, a new law entered into force which abolished this status, and Zghurivka became a rural settlement.

== Economy ==
Zghurivka is a centre of sugar industry.
