= Brovary =

City in Kyiv Oblast, Ukraine

Brovary Бровари
- City
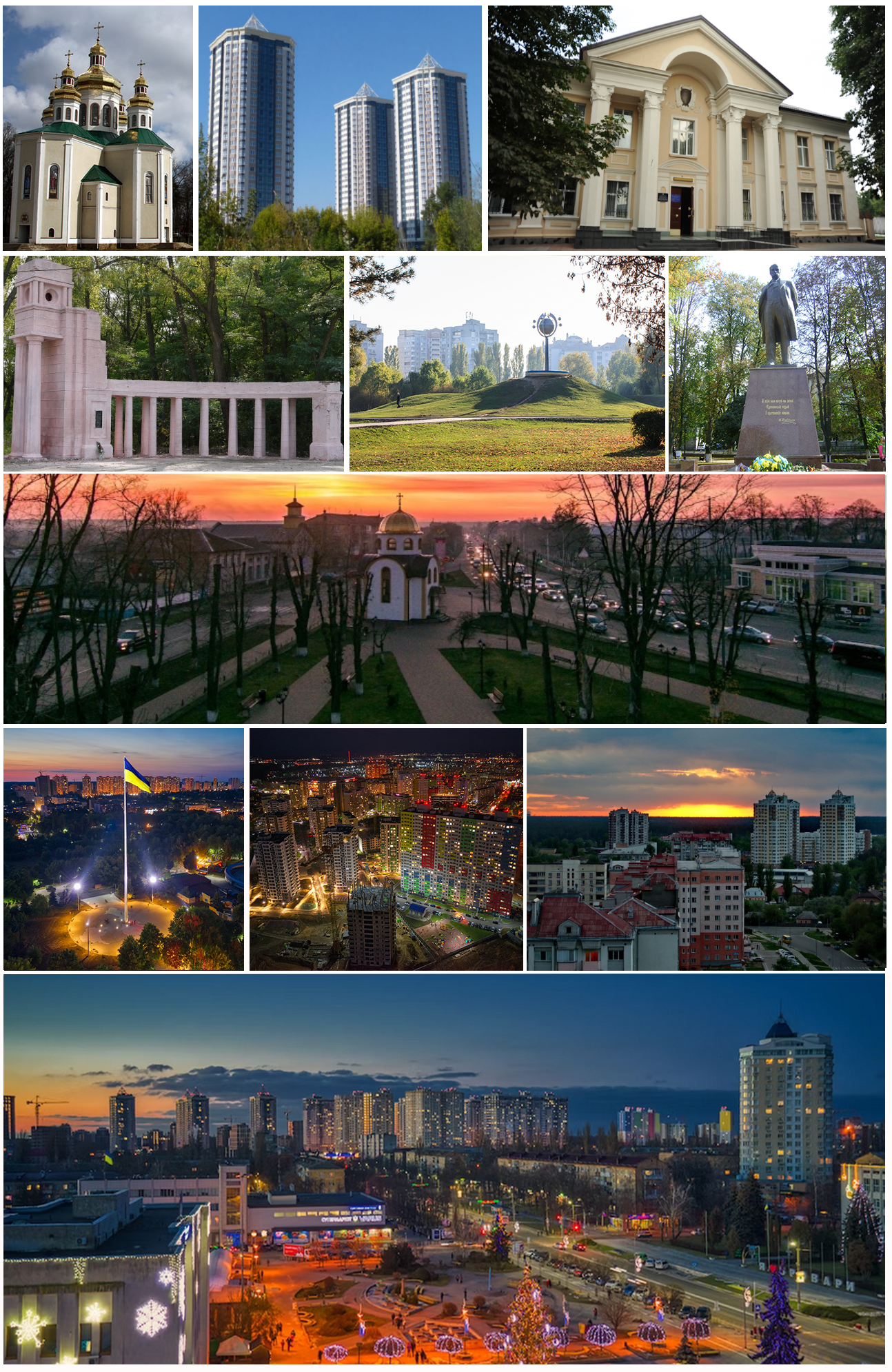
- Top to bottom, left to right: Saints Peter and Paul Church; Zelenyi Quarter; Prosecutor's Office; Entrance to the Boryspil International Airport; Victory Park; Monument to Taras Shevchenko; Shevchenko Square; Flag in the Victory Park; Kyivska Street; Neighborhood of Hrushevskoho Street; View of the City Centre

- Flag Coat of arms
- Interactive map of Brovary
- Location within Kyiv Oblast Location within Ukraine
- Coordinates: 50°30′40″N 30°47′24″E
- Country: Ukraine
- Oblast: Kyiv Oblast
- Raion: Brovary Raion
- Hromada: Brovary urban hromada

Government
  - Mayor: Ihor Sapozhko

Population (2022)
  - Total: 109,806
  - Density: 2,534/km^{2} (6,560/sq mi)
- Time zone: UTC+2 (EET)
  - Summer (DST): UTC+3 (EEST)
- Postal code: 07400—07409
- Area code: +380 4594
- Website: brovary-rada.gov.ua

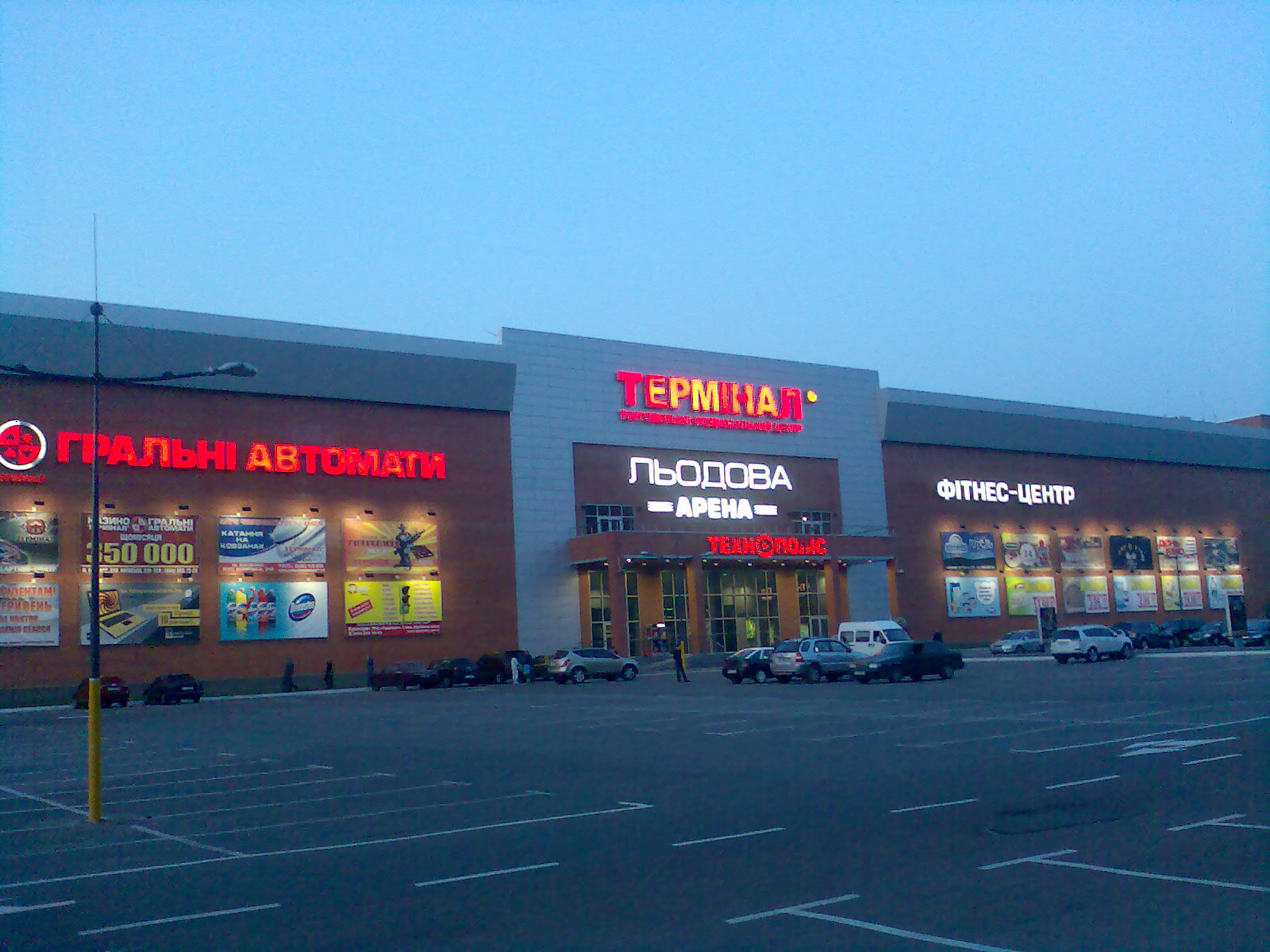
Brovary Terminal shopping mall

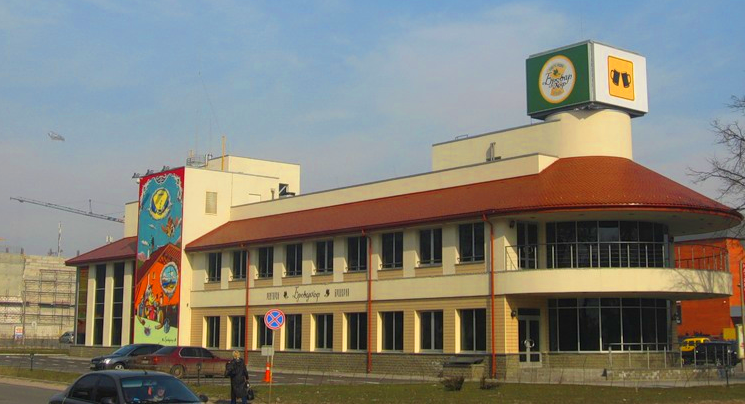
Brovary brewery

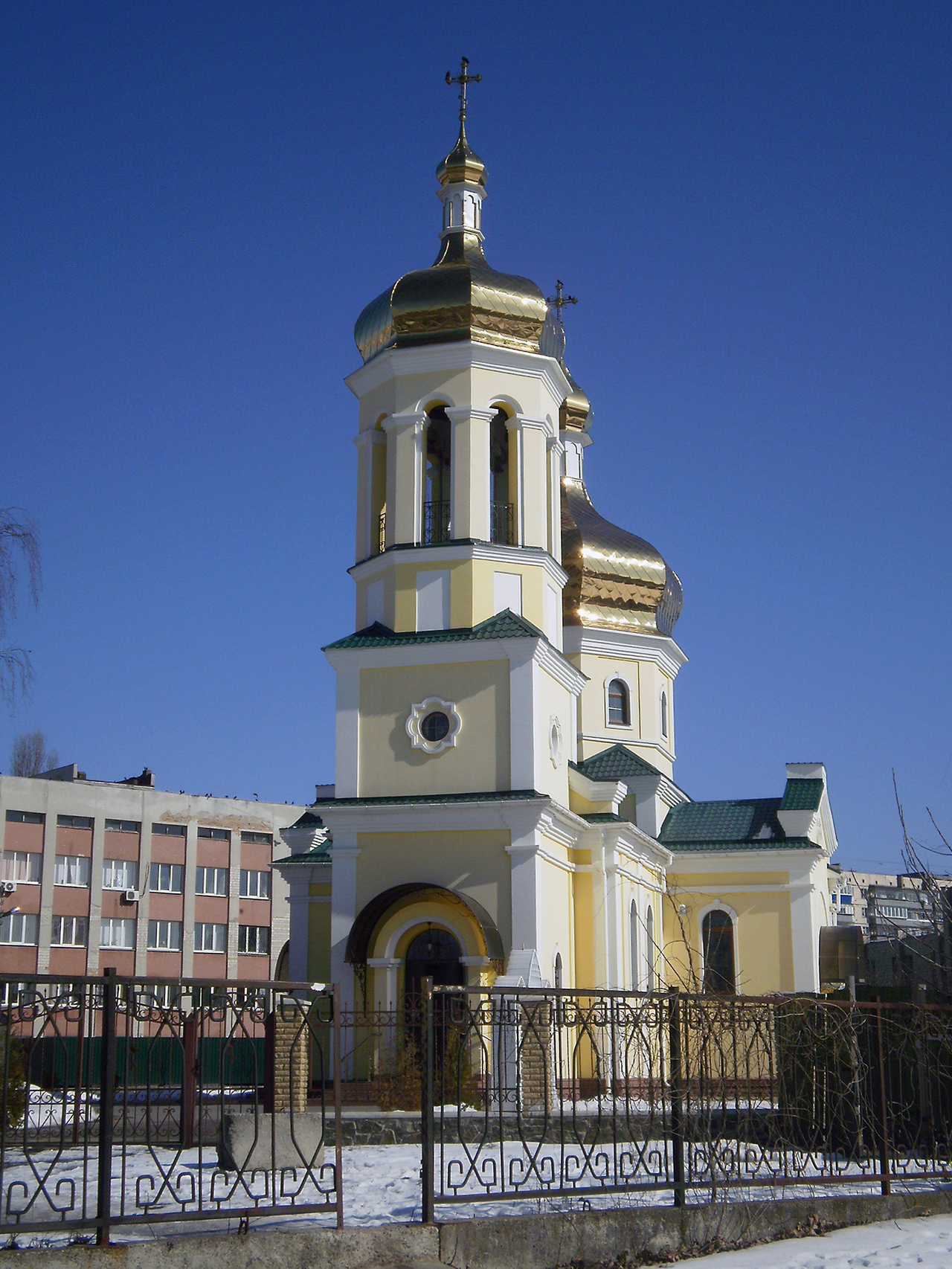
A church in Brovary

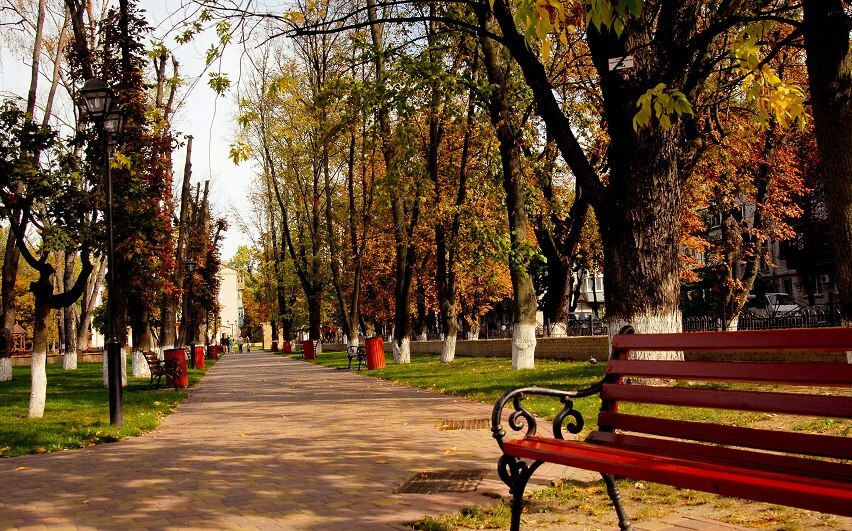
City Park

Brovary (Ukrainian: Бровари, IPA: [browɐˈrɪ]; Yiddish: בראָוואַר, romanized: Brovar) is a city in Kyiv Oblast, northern Ukraine, situated to the east of the capital Kyiv and part of the Kyiv metropolitan area. It serves as the administrative centre of Brovary Raion. Brovary hosts the administration of Brovary urban hromada, one of the hromadas of Ukraine. In 2024, about 100,000 people live in the city.

== History ==
=== Early history ===
Brovary is a historic town, first mentioned in 1630. At the time there were only 60 or 70 houses in Brovary, but in 1649 a Cossack sotnia is known to have been formed there. Cossacks took part in the Khmelnytsky Uprising under Bohdan Khmelnytsky's leadership.

Originally, the town was called Brovari (Ukrainian: Броварі), but the name was changed in 1969 to make it more similar to Russian. The name, translated from Ukrainian, means 'breweries' (and is a loanword from Dutch). The town got its name after breweries where special beer was made. Travellers who went to Kyiv often stopped in Brovary, rested, dined and drank the local beer. Many famous people visited Brovary while travelling to Kyiv. A Ukrainian poet, Taras Shevchenko, was among them. He visited this town many times in the period from 1829 to 1847. Nowadays there is a monument to Shevchenko in the place from which Brovary began its history as a town, in its old centre.

In January 1918 Brovary was a site of battles between Ukrainian troops and the Bolsheviks, and in November of the same year it was fought over by Hetman's guard and rebel forces of Anhel and Zeleny.

In 1923, Brovary became the center of Brovary Raion. In that year, Brovary had a population of 4,065 people. In 1930, the district was reworked, with its center moved to Velyka Dymerka. In 1937, this change was undone, and the center was moved back to Brovary.

Brovary received city status in 1956, and in 1972 was designated a city of oblast significance – meaning that while Brovary still served as the administrative center of Brovary Raion, it was no longer subordinated to it, instead being directly subordinated to the government of Kyiv Oblast.

=== Early 21st century ===
International ill-fame came to Brovary in April 2000 after an apartment block was hit by a stray surface-to-surface missile launched from a neighbouring army shooting range in Honcharivske during a training exercise. Three people were killed.

During the country-wide Ukrainian administrative reform of 17 July 2020, Brovary's status as a city of oblast significance was abolished, and it was returned to subordination to Brovary Raion.

=== Russian invasion of Ukraine ===
It was reported on 10 March 2022 that there had been an attack on a Russian armoured column at Skybyn, just outside Brovary, as it was trying to move in from the north. On 11 March there were fights in Brovary as Russian troops were trying to encircle Kyiv from its east.

On 2 April 2022 the whole of Kyiv Oblast, where Brovary is located, was declared liberated by the Ukrainian Ministry of Defense after Russian troops had left the area.

In August 2023, Ukrainian Institute of National Memory decided that the name of the city did not meet the spelling norms and standards of the state language (Ukrainian), meaning that Brovary will be renamed. On 20 March 2024, the Committee of the Verkhovna Rada on issues of organization of state power, local self-government, regional development and urban planning decided to propose the old name, Brovari, which corresponds to Ukrainian language standards. The ultimate decision on the renaming will be made only after a vote.

== Geography ==
Brovary is a raion centre in Kyiv Oblast. It is situated 20 kilometers from the capital of Ukraine, Kyiv. Brovary Raion lies in the areas of mixed forests. The climate here is moderately continental with the middle temperature −6 °C in January and +19 °C in July.

== Layout ==
The modern centre of Brovary is the newest part of the town. In the central park you can see monuments to the past. There is a plane and a tank. Some shops, offices and cafes are situated there also.

Traditionally the town is divided into three parts: the old town, the new town, and the industrial part. There are many plants and factories in the town, producing knitting, furniture, machine tools, plastic materials and other goods. There are ten secondary schools, two music schools, a school of Arts, and three libraries in Brovary. In the city center lies "Prometey", the historical museum in Gagarin street, which attracts many visitors. If you are fond of sports, you may go to the swimming pools or to the "Spartak" stadium, or even enter the sport college.

== Culture ==
During the month of September the citizens of Brovary mark the Holiday of the Town's Day. This is the time when everyone can watch and listen to concerts of musicians and singers, and see performances by dancers who live in the district. On this day, all the competitions are for show. (but Brovary itself is known to be a sports town, where a lot of sportsmen have started their career)

== Economy ==
In the 21st century, Brovary is Ukraine's shoe-making capital, with dozens of such companies located there. There is also a broadcasting centre for long and shortwave transmissions. The longwave transmitter, which works on 207 kHz, uses as its antenna two 259.6 m (852 ft) tall guyed mast radiators each equipped with a cage antenna at their lower part.

The city also houses a railway station.

== Sports ==
Brovary is also an important sport centre of Ukraine. Several world and Olympic champions were born and/or began their career here. Ukraine's national mint facility is located in Brovary.

Oleksandra Kononova won three medals at the 2010 Paralympic games in Vancouver and became the 2010 Ukrainian sports personality of the year.

== Demographics ==
As of the 2001 Ukrainian census, Brovary had a population of 86,839 people. In terms of self-reported ethnic background, 84% of people in Brovary said they were Ukrainians, 14% said they were Russians, and 0.9% Belarusians.

Population history
Year	1769	1897	1923	1930	2001	2022
Pop.	708	4,312	4,065	5,618	86,839	109,806
±% p.a.	—	+1.42%	−0.23%	+4.73%	+3.93%	+1.12%

== International relations ==
=== Twin towns — Sister cities ===
Brovary is twinned with:

City	Country	Year of Signing
Fontenay-sous-Bois	France	1989
Slutsk	Belarus	1992
Rockford, Illinois	United States	1995
Hengyang, Hunan	China	1995
Tacoma, Washington	United States	2017

== Notable people associated with the city ==
- Mariya Lagunova, World War II Soviet woman tank driver, honorary citizen of the city
- Oleg Velyky, handball player
- Oleh Lisohor, swimmer
