= Zelena =

Zelena may refer to:

- Zelena (Once Upon a Time)
- Zelena, Chortkiv Raion
- Zelena, Kovel Raion
- Zelena, Nadvirna Raion
- Zelena River, a river in Ukraine, a tributary of Inhulets River
