= Velyka Dymerka settlement hromada =

Velyka Dymerka settlement hromada Великодимерська селищна громада
- Hromada
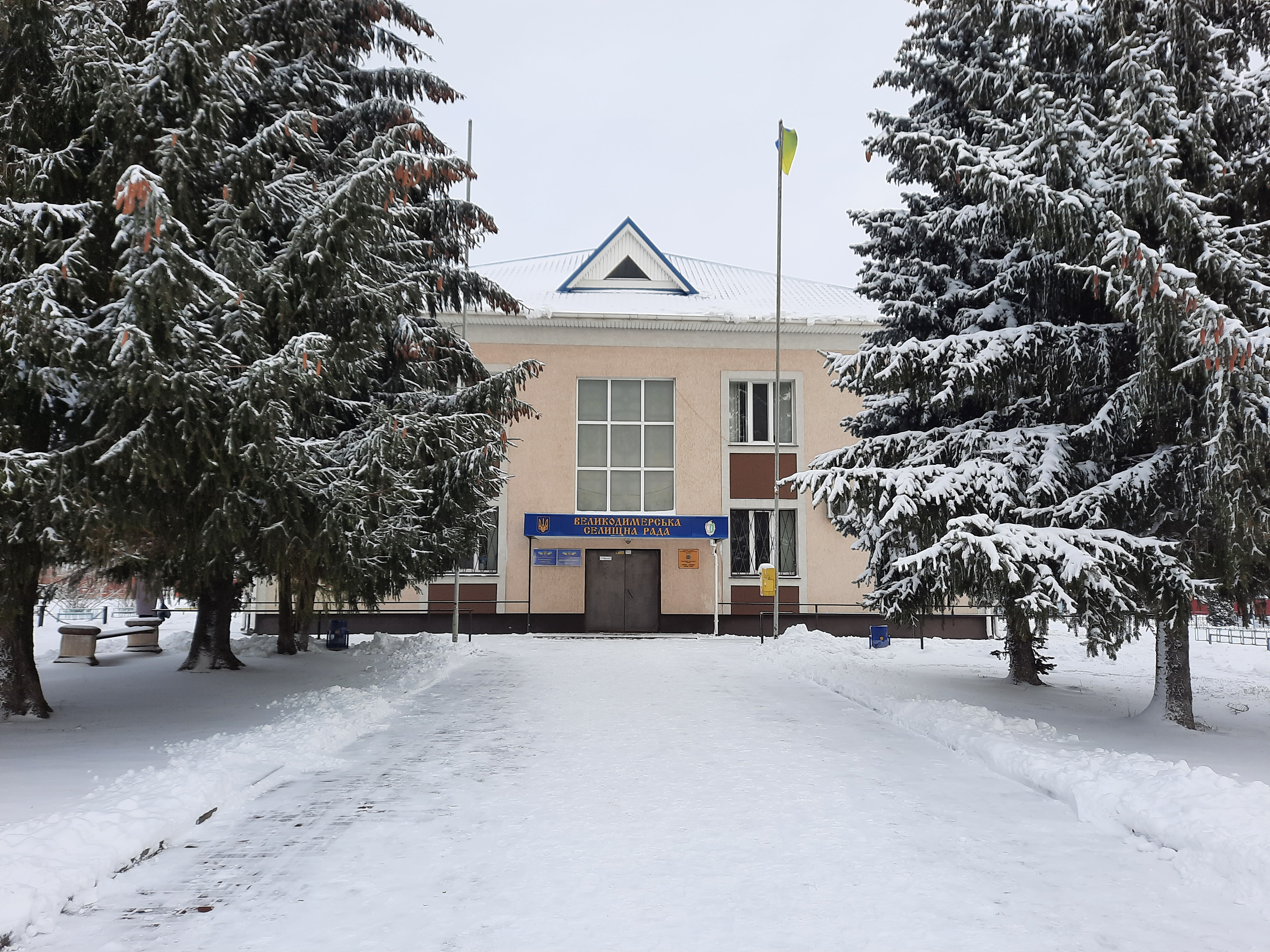

- Seal
- Interactive map of Velyka Dymerka settlement hromada
- Country: Ukraine
- Oblast: Kyiv
- Raion: Brovary

Area
  - Total: 530.3 km^{2} (204.7 sq mi)

Population (2020)
  - Total: 30,237
  - Density: 57.02/km^{2} (147.7/sq mi)
- Settlements: 23
- Villages: 22
- Towns: 1

Velyka Dymerka settlement hromada (Ukrainian: Великодимерська селищна громада) is a hromada of Ukraine, located in Brovary Raion, Kyiv Oblast. Its administrative center is the town of Velyka Dymerka.

It has an area of 530.3 square kilometres (204.7 mi^{2}) and a population of 30,237, as of 2020.

The hromada includes 23 settlements: 1 town (Velyka Dymerka), and 22 villages:

- Bobryk
- Bohdanivka
- Vilne
- Haiove
- Hoholiv
- Hrebelky
- Zherdova
- Zalissia
- Zakharivka
- Zoria
- Kulazhyntsi
- Mykhailivka
- Pershe Travnia
- Pershotravneve
- Pidlissia
- Ploske
- Pokrovske
- Rudnia
- Rusaniv
- Svitylnia
- Tarasivka
- Shevchenkove

== See also ==
- List of hromadas of Ukraine
