= Kalynivka, Brovary Raion, Kyiv Oblast =

Rural locality in Kyiv Oblast, Ukraine

Kalynivka Калинівка
- Rural settlement
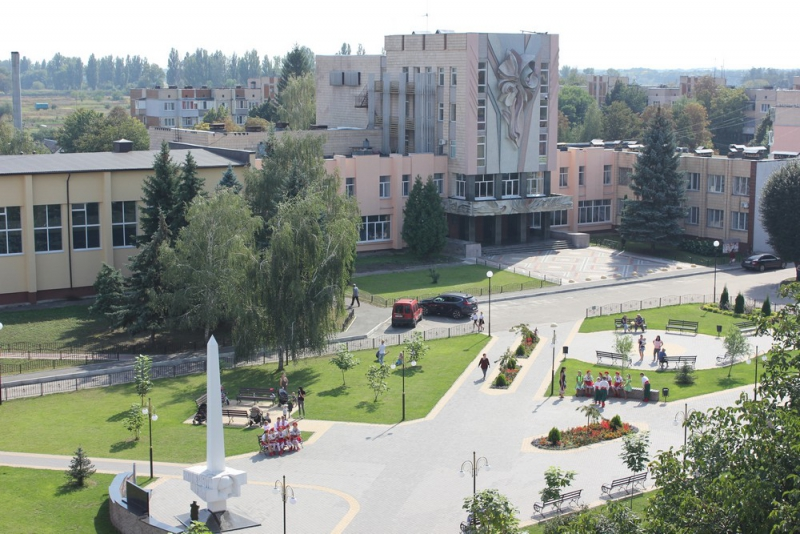

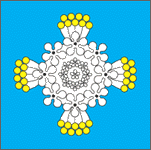
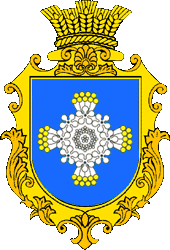
- Flag Coat of arms

- Location of Kalynivka in Kyiv Oblast Location of Kalynivka in Ukraine
- Coordinates: 50°33′33″N 30°49′16″E
- Country: Ukraine
- Oblast: Kyiv Oblast
- Raion: Brovary Raion
- Hromada: Kalynivka settlement hromada
- Founded: 1928
- Town status: January 23, 2003

Population (2022)
  - Total: 3,723
- Time zone: UTC+2 (EET)
  - Summer (DST): UTC+3 (EEST)
- Postal code: 07443
- Area code: +380 4594
- Website: http://rada.gov.ua/

Kalynivka (Ukrainian: Калинівка) is a rural settlement in Brovary Raion (district) of Kyiv Oblast (province) in northern Ukraine. It hosts the administration of Kalynivka settlement hromada, one of the hromadas of Ukraine. Its population is 6,178 as of the 2001 Ukrainian Census. Kalynivka was founded in 1928 as a village, and it retained its village status until it was upgraded to that of an urban-type settlement on January 23, 2003. Population: 3,723 (2022 estimate).

Until 26 January 2024, Kalynivka was designated urban-type settlement. On this day, a new law entered into force which abolished this status, and Kalynivka became a rural settlement.
