= Litky, Khmelnytskyi Oblast =

Village in Khmelnytskyi Oblast, Ukraine

Litky Літки
- Location of Litky Litky (Ukraine)
- Coordinates: 49°15′56″N 27°21′22″E
- Country: Ukraine
- Oblast: Khmelnytskyi Oblast
- Raion: Khmelnytskyi Raion

Population (2001)
  - Total: ▼390
  - Estimate (2022): ▲270
- Postal code: 32240
- Area code: +380 3856
- Climate: Cfa

Litky (Ukrainian: Літки) is a village located in Khmelnytskyi Raion, Khmelnytskyi Oblast (province) of Ukraine.

Litky was previously located in the Derazhnia Raion. The raion was abolished on 18 July 2020 as part of the administrative reform of Ukraine, which reduced the number of raions of Khmelnytskyi Oblast to three. The area of Derazhnia Raion was merged into Khmelnytskyi Raion.
