= 52nd Reconnaissance Battalion (Ukraine) =

- 52-й окремий розвідувальний батальйон
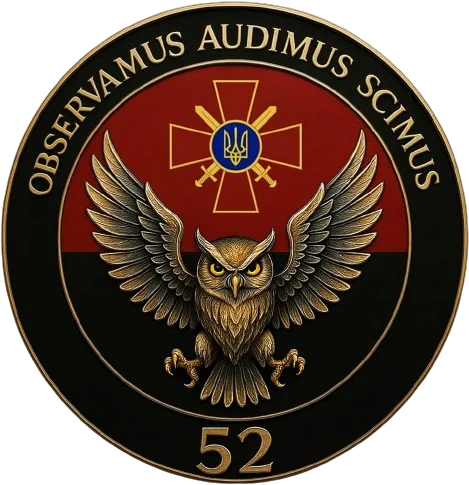
- Battalion's insignia
- Founded: 2022
- Country: Ukraine
- Allegiance: Armed Forces of Ukraine
- Branch: Ukrainian Ground Forces
- Type: Battalion, spetsnaz
- Role: Reconnaissance, counteroffensive and sabotage
- Part of: 68th Jaeger Brigade
- Garrison/HQ: Ivano-Frankivsk Oblast
- Engagements: Russo-Ukrainian War; 2022 Russian invasion of Ukraine

Insignia
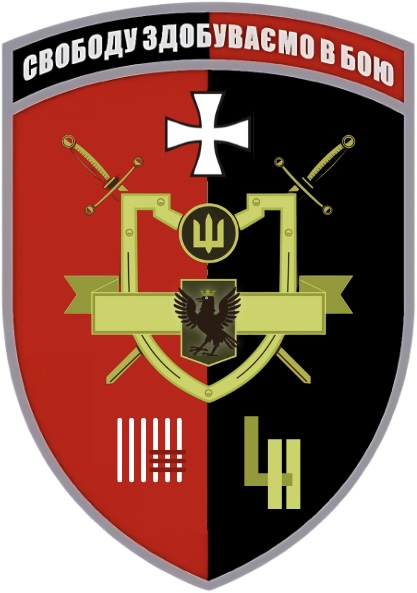
- Former Insignia

The 52nd Separate Reconnaissance Battalion (MUN A4128) is a battalion of the Ukrainian ground forces acting as an independent unit, formerly subordinated to the 68th Jaeger Brigade. It has seen combat during the Russo-Ukrainian war, initially as a rifle battalion and has been performing reconnaissance and combat operations throughout the entire front. It was established in June 2022.

== History ==
The battalion was established in June 2022 and was mainly composed of volunteers from the Carpathian region who joined the ranks of the Armed Forces of Ukraine. In the summer of 2022, it was deployed along the Ukraine-Belarus border and later saw combat during the Battle of Vuhledar, Battle of Pavlivka and the Battle of Avdiivka as part of the 68th Jaeger Brigade.

In May 2025, it received six quadcopters from the Ivano-Frankivsk Regional Military Administration.
