= Kalynivka settlement hromada, Brovary Raion, Kyiv Oblast =

Kalynivka settlement hromada Калинівська селищна громада
- Hromada
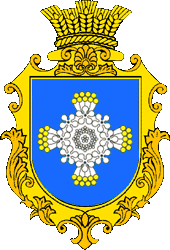
- Seal
- Interactive map of Kalynivka settlement hromada
- Country: Ukraine
- Oblast: Kyiv
- Raion: Brovary

Area
  - Total: 65.8 km^{2} (25.4 sq mi)

Population (2020)
  - Total: 8,468
  - Density: 129/km^{2} (333/sq mi)
- Settlements: 6
- Villages: 5
- Towns: 1

Kalynivka settlement hromada (Ukrainian: Калинівська селищна громада) is a hromada of Ukraine, located in Brovary Raion, Kyiv Oblast. Its administrative center is the town of Kalynivka.

It has an area of 65.8 square kilometres (25.4 mi^{2}) and a population of 8,468, as of 2020.

The hromada includes 6 settlements: 1 town (Kalynivka), and 5 villages:

- Kvitneve
- Krasylivka
- Peremoha
- Rozhivka
- Skybyn

== See also ==
- List of hromadas of Ukraine
