= Roman Darmohrai =

Ukrainian soldier (born 1993)

- Роман Дармограй
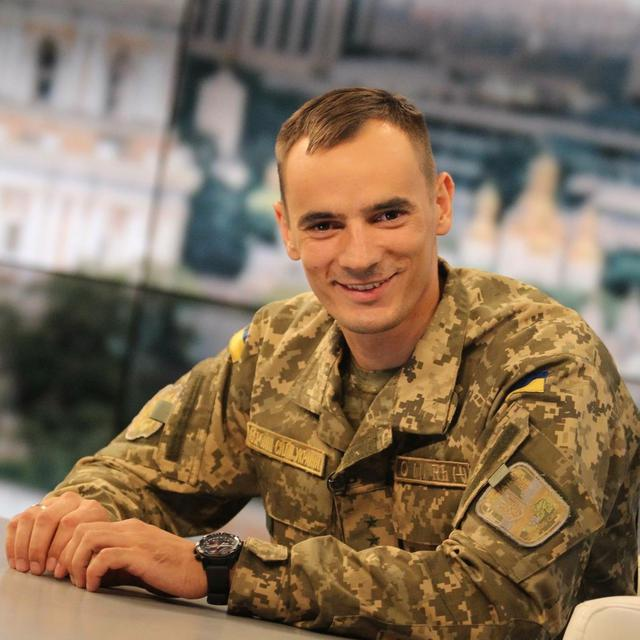
- Born: Roman Anatoliiovych Darmohrai; 22 October 1993 (age 32)
- Education: Hetman Petro Sahaidachnyi National Army Academy
- Military career
- Allegiance: Ukraine
- Branch: Armed Forces of Ukraine
- Rank: Pidpolkovnyk
- Unit: 72nd Mechanized Brigade
- Conflicts: Russo-Ukrainian War: Battle of Brovary
- Awards: Hero of Ukraine; Order of Bohdan Khmelnytskyi; Order of People's Hero of Ukraine; Defender of the Motherland Medal

Roman Anatoliiovych Darmohrai (Ukrainian: Роман Анатолійович Дармограй; born 22 October 1993) is a Ukrainian soldier, Pidpolkovnyk of the 72nd Mechanized Brigade of the Armed Forces of Ukraine, a participant in the Russian-Ukrainian war.

In 2022, he was included in Forbes' 30 Under 30: Faces of the Future.

== Biography ==
In 2015, he graduated from the Hetman Petro Sahaidachnyi National Army Academy. Since then, he has been serving in the 72nd Separate Mechanized Brigade named after the Black Cossacks, where he rose from platoon commander to deputy brigade commander. He is a participant of the ATO/JFO.

He began his military service in the 72nd Separate Mechanized Brigade "Black Zaporozhians", where he advanced from platoon commander to deputy brigade commander. He participated in the Anti-Terrorist Operation and the Joint Forces Operation. He defended Ukrainian positions near Volnovakha in 2015–2016, Avdiivka in 2016–2017, and on the Svitlodarsk bulge in 2018–2019.

=== Russian invasion of Ukraine 2022 ===
During the Russian invasion of Ukraine in 2022, he planned and organized the defense of the settlements of Pukhivka, Rozhivka and Kalynivka in the Brovary Raion of the Kyiv Oblast, creating an effective fire system for the brigade's mechanized battalion units. After almost four hours of fighting, on 9 March, 17 tanks, 3 armored personnel carriers and up to 55 enemy soldiers were destroyed.

== Awards ==
- the title of "Hero of Ukraine" with the award of the Order of the Golden Star (19 March 2022)
- Order of Bohdan Khmelnytskyi, 3rd class (1 February 2017)
- Order of People's Hero of Ukraine (2017)
- Defender of the Motherland Medal (2 December 2016)
