= Litky, Zhytomyr Oblast =

Village in Zhytomyr Oblast, Ukraine

Litky Літки
- Location of Litky Litky (Ukraine)
- Coordinates: 51°02′59″N 28°25′34″E
- Country: Ukraine
- Oblast: Zhytomyr Oblast
- Raion: Korosten Raion

Population (2001)
  - Total: 699
- Postal code: 11325
- Area code: +380 4161
- Climate: Cfa

Litky (Ukrainian: Літки) is a village located in Korosten Raion, Zhytomyr Oblast (province) of Ukraine.

Litky was previously located in the Luhyny Raion. The raion was abolished on 18 July 2020 as part of the administrative reform of Ukraine, which reduced the number of raions of Zhytomyr Oblast to four. The area of Luhyny Raion was merged into Korosten Raion.
