= Velyka Dymerka =

Rural locality in Kyiv Oblast, Ukraine

Velyka Dymerka Велика Димерка
- Rural settlement
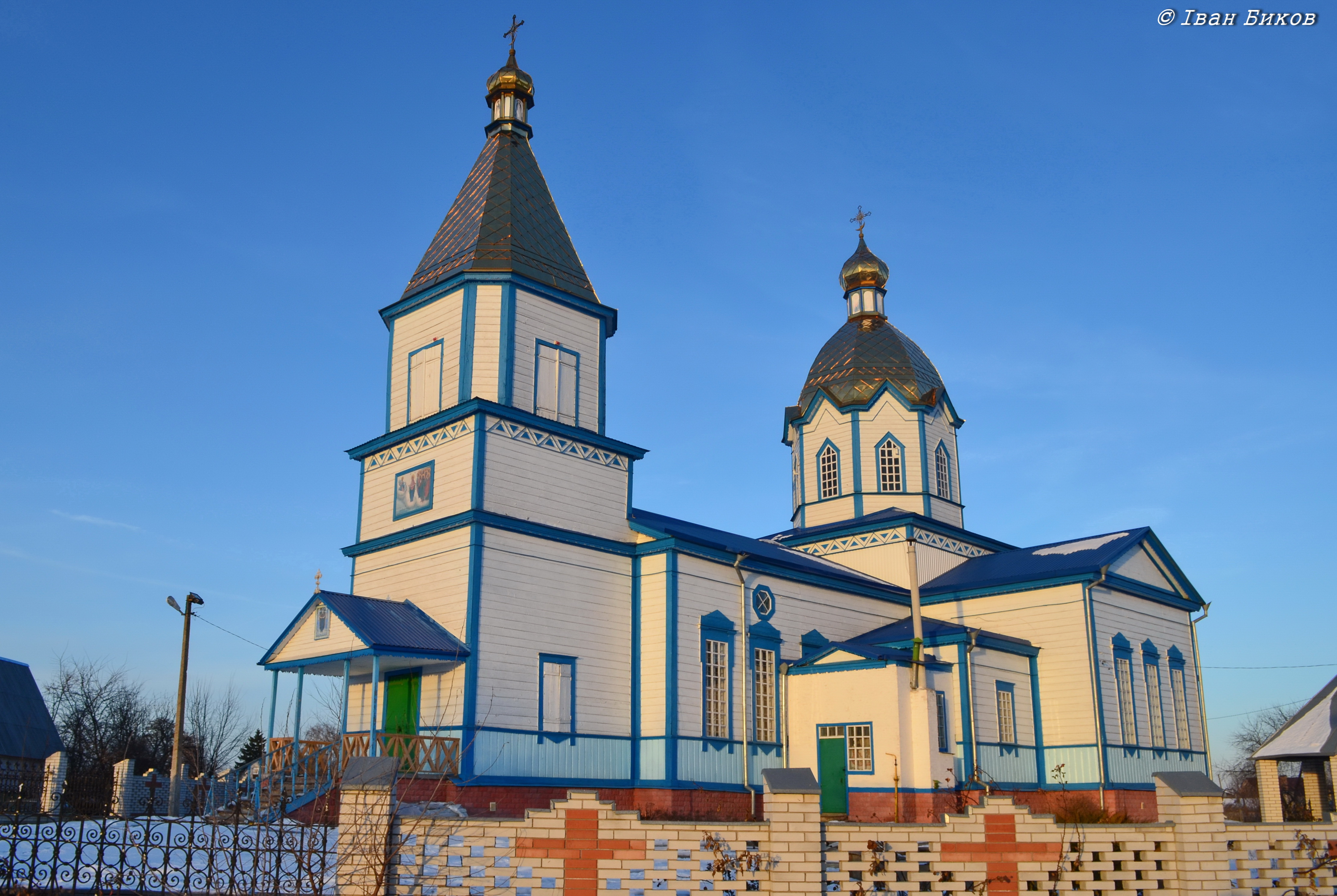
- Church of the Intercession in Velyka Dymerka

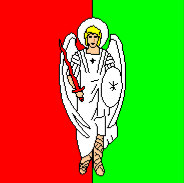
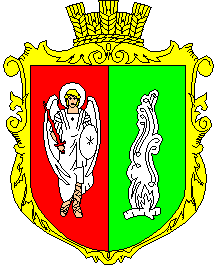
- Flag Coat of arms

- Location of Velyka Dymerka in Ukraine Velyka Dymerka (Ukraine)
- Coordinates: 50°35′34″N 30°54′37″E
- Country: Ukraine
- Oblast: Kyiv Oblast
- Raion: Brovary Raion
- Hromada: Velyka Dymerka settlement hromada
- Founded: 1552
- Town status: 2000

Government
  - Town Head: Anatoliy Bochkarov

Population (2024)
  - Total: About 9,000
- Time zone: UTC+2 (EET)
  - Summer (DST): UTC+3 (EEST)
- Postal code: 07442
- Area code: +381 4594

Velyka Dymerka (Ukrainian: Велика Димерка, Ukrainian pronunciation: [ʋeˈlɪkɐ ˈdɪmerkɐ]) is a rural settlement in Brovary Raion (district) of Kyiv Oblast (province) in northern Ukraine. Velyka Dymerka hosts the administration of Velyka Dymerka settlement hromada, one of the hromadas of Ukraine. The settlement is one of the largest localities in Brovary Raion, with a permanent population of 10,074 as of the 2001 Ukrainian Census. It has a population of 9,418 (2022 estimate).

== History ==
Velyka Dymerka is first mentioned in written sources in 1552 as Dymerka (Ukrainian: Димерка), exempt from paying taxes because of its destruction in 1482 at the hands of Tatar forces commanded by Meñli I Giray. Its name originates from the fact that the production of saltpeter and tar in the village caused smoke to constantly rise above the village. The Ukrainian word for smoke is dym (дим), hence Dymerka.

The settlement was a site of battles fought by forces of Sich Riflemen and Ukrainian People's Army against the Bolsheviks in 1917 and January 1919.

In 1923, Dymerka was renamed to Velyka Dymerka, which means "Great Dymerka". From 1930 to 1937, Velyka Dymerka served as the administrative center of Brovary Raion. During World War II, Velyka Dymerka was occupied by Nazi Germany from September 17, 1941 to September 23, 1943.

following the Russo-Ukrainian-war in 2022, Velyka Dymerka was occupied from 8th of march and freed on the 1st of april.

In 2000, the village's status was upgraded to that of an urban-type settlement. On 26 January 2024, a new law entered into force which abolished this status, and Velyka Dymerka became a rural settlement.

== People ==
- Vladimir Pecherin (1807–1885), Russian poet and political figure
- Hryhoriy Vasiura (1915–1987), Red Army lieutenant and Nazi collaborator, moved there in 1955
- Viktor Postol (1984), a Ukrainian professional boxer
