= Zghurivka settlement hromada =

Zghurivka settlement hromada Згурівська селищна громада
- Hromada
- Interactive map of Zghurivka settlement hromada
- Country: Ukraine
- Oblast: Kyiv
- Raion: Brovary

Area
  - Total: 760.3 km^{2} (293.6 sq mi)

Population (2020)
  - Total: 15,227
  - Density: 20.03/km^{2} (51.87/sq mi)
- Settlements: 41
- Villages: 40
- Towns: 1

Zghurivka settlement hromada (Ukrainian: Згурівська селищна громада) is a hromada of Ukraine, located in Brovary Raion, Kyiv Oblast. Its administrative center is the town of Zghurivka.

It has an area of 760.3 square kilometres (293.6 mi^{2}) and a population of 15,227, as of 2020.

The hromada includes 41 settlements: 1 town (Zghurivka), and 40 villages:

- Arkadiivka
- Bezuhlivka
- Velykyi Krupil
- Vyshneve
- Vilne
- Voznesensk
- Voitove
- Volodymyrske
- Horbachivka
- Hrechana Hreblia
- Zhukivka
- Zelene
- Illinske
- Krasne
- Levchenkove
- Lyzohubova Sloboda
- Liubomyrivka
- Maiske
- Mala Berezanka
- Mala Supoivka
- Malyi Krupil
- Nova Oleksandrivka
- Nova Orzhytsia
- Oleksandrynivka
- Oleksiivka
- Paiky
- Paskivshchyna
- Polkovnyche
- Svoboda
- Seredivka
- Sofiivka
- Stara Orzhytsia
- Stare
- Terleshchyna
- Turivka
- Ursalivka
- Usivka
- Cherevky
- Shevchenkove
- Shchaslyve

== See also ==
- List of hromadas of Ukraine
