= Kalyta settlement hromada =

Kalyta settlement hromada Калитянська селищна громада
- Hromada
- Interactive map of Kalyta settlement hromada
- Country: Ukraine
- Oblast: Kyiv
- Raion: Brovary

Area
  - Total: 245.2 km^{2} (94.7 sq mi)

Population (2020)
  - Total: 10,565
  - Density: 43.09/km^{2} (111.6/sq mi)
- Settlements: 6
- Villages: 5
- Towns: 1

Kalyta settlement hromada (Ukrainian: Калитянська селищна громада) is a hromada of Ukraine, located in Brovary Raion, Kyiv Oblast. Its administrative center is the town of Kalyta.

It has an area of 245.2 square kilometres (94.7 mi^{2}) and a population of 10,565, as of 2020.

The hromada includes 6 settlements: 1 town (Kalyta), and 5 villages:

- Bervytsia
- Zavorychi
- Mokrets
- Opanasiv
- Semypolky

== See also ==
- List of hromadas of Ukraine
