= Brovary Raion =

Subdivision of Kyiv Oblast, Ukraine

Brovary Raion Броварський район
- Raion
- Броварський район (Brovarskyi raion)
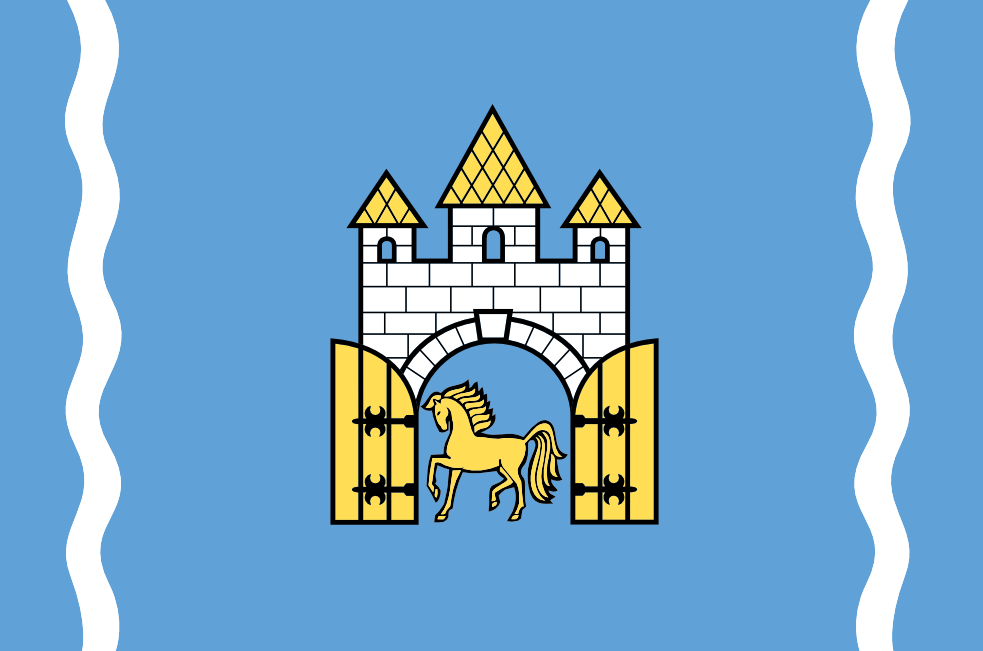
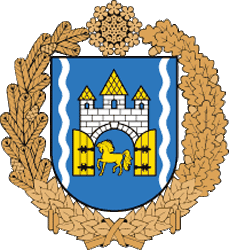
- Flag Coat of arms
- Interactive map of Brovary Raion
- Coordinates: 50°36′49″N 30°56′48″E
- Country: Ukraine
- Oblast: Kyiv Oblast
- Admin. center: Brovary
- Subdivisions: 8 hromadas

Population (2022)
  - Total: 241,777
- Time zone: UTC+02:00 (EET)
  - Summer (DST): UTC+03:00 (EEST)
- Area code: +380

Brovary Raion (Ukrainian: Броварський район) is a raion (district) in Kyiv Oblast of Ukraine. Its administrative center is the town of Brovary. Its population is 241,777 (2022 estimate).

== History ==
In 1923, Brovary Raion was established with its center in Brovary. In 1930, the raion was reworked, with its center moved to Velyka Dymerka. In 1937, this change was undone, and the center was moved back to Brovary.

Brovary was designated a city of oblast significance in 1972 - meaning that while Brovary still served as the administrative center of Brovary Raion, it was no longer subordinated to it, instead being directly subordinated to the government of Kyiv Oblast. This slightly decreased the territory of the raion.

On 18 July 2020, as part of the administrative reform of Ukraine, the number of raions of Kyiv Oblast was reduced to seven, and the area of Brovary Raion was significantly expanded. Two abolished raions, Baryshivka and Zghurivka Raions, as well as the cities of Berezan and Brovary, which were previously incorporated as a city of oblast significance and did not belong to the raion, were merged into Brovary Raion. The January 2020 estimate of the raion population was 68,688 (2020 est.).

Starting on 1 March 2022, the area of Brovary Raion became an arena of hostilities between the Ukrainian army and Russian occupation forces. Battles were fought on the territory of Baryshivka, Kalyta, and Velyka Dymerka hromadas. Residents of the surrounding villages were evacuated to Brovary. Three civilians were murdered by the Russian troops in the village of Bohdanivka of Brovary Raion.

== Subdivisions ==
=== Current ===
After the reform in July 2020, the raion consisted of 8 hromadas:

Brovary Raion subdivisions
Hromada (Community)	Admin. center	Population (2020)	Transferred/Retained from
Baryshivka settlement	Baryshivka	26,999	Baryshivka Raion;
Berezan urban	Berezan	21,921	city of oblast significance of Berezan;
Brovary urban	Brovary	119,573	city of oblast significance of Brovary;
Kalynivka settlement	Kalynivka	8,468	Brovary Raion;
Kalyta settlement	Kalyta	10,565	Brovary Raion;
Velyka Dymerka settlement	Velyka Dymerka	30,237	Brovary Raion;
Zazymia rural	Zazymia	9,190	Brovary Raion;
Zghurivka settlement	Zghurivka	15,227	Zghurivka Raion.

=== Before 2020 ===
Brovary Raion in Kyiv Oblast (1966-2020)

Before the 2020 reform, the raion consisted of four hromadas,

- Kalynivka settlement hromada with the administration in Kalynivka;
- Kalyta settlement hromada with the administration in Kalyta;
- Velyka Dymerka settlement hromada with the administration in Velyka Dymerka;
- Zazymia rural hromada with the administration in Zazymia.
