= Baryshivka Raion =

Former subdivision of Kyiv Oblast, Ukraine

Baryshivka Raion Баришівський район
- Raion
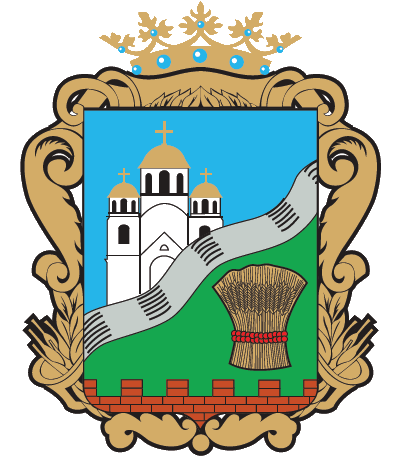
- Flag Coat of arms

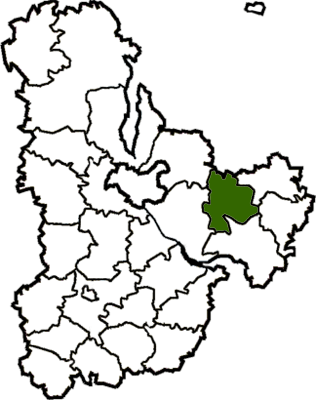
- Country: Ukraine
- Region: Kyiv Oblast
- Established: 1965
- Disestablished: 18 July 2020
- Admin. center: Baryshivka
- Subdivisions: List: 0 — city councils; 1 — settlement councils; 25 — rural councils; Number of localities: 0 — cities; 1 — urban-type settlements; 38 — villages; 0 — rural settlements

Government
  - Governor: Sergiy Borysovych Vasylskivskyi

Area
  - Total: 957.6 km^{2} (369.7 sq mi)

Population (2020)
  - Total: 34,577
  - Density: 36.11/km^{2} (93.52/sq mi)
- Time zone: UTC+02:00 (EET)
  - Summer (DST): UTC+03:00 (EEST)
- Postal index: 075
- Area code: 380
- Website: www.baryshivka.com.ua

Baryshivka Raion (Ukrainian: Баришівський район, romanized: Baryšivs'kyj rajon) was a raion in east-central Kyiv Oblast (province) of Ukraine. Its administrative center was the urban-type settlement of Baryshivka. The raions area totaled 957.6 km^{2}. The raion was formerly known as Baryshivska Rairada from 1923 to 1963. The raion was abolished on 18 July 2020 as part of the administrative reform of Ukraine, which reduced the number of raions of Kyiv Oblast to seven. The area of Baryshivka Raion was merged into Brovary Raion. The last estimate of the raion population was 34,577 (2020 est.).

== Geography ==
Baryshivka Raion was located in the east-central area of Kyiv Oblast, and had a total area of 957.6 km^{2} (about 3.46 % of the total oblast's territory).

Water covered about 10 km^{2} of raion. Through the raion flowed the tributaries of the Dnieper: Trubizh, Krasylivka, Ilta, and the Nedra rivers. Baryshivka Raion bordered the following raions: Boryspil and Yahotyn raions of Kyiv Oblast on the west, Yahotyn raion on the east, Zghurivka raion of Kyiv Oblast and Bobrovytsia raion of Chernihiv Oblast on the north, and Pereiaslav-Khmelnytskyi raion on the south.

== Demographics ==
The urban population of Baryshivka Raion included 11,300 people, and rural population included 29,700 people. The number of pensioners totaled 12,800, about 31.1% of the total population of the raion. The density of the raion's population was 42.9 p/km^{2}. The birth rate for the raion was 4 children per 1,000 inhabitants, and the mortality rate is 15 people per 1,000 inhabitants.

The ethnic composition was: Ukrainians 38,700 people (94.2 %), Russians 2,000 people (4.8 %), Belarusians 200 people (0.5 %) and others combined total 200 people (0.5 %).

== Subdivisions ==
At the time of disestablishment, the raion consisted of one hromada, Baryshivka settlement hromada with the administration in the urban-type settlement of Baryshivka.

Baryshivka Raion consisted of 1 urban-type settlement (selyshche mis’koho typu), Baryshivka; and 38 villages (selo). The settlements of Baryshivka Raion were:

- Baryshivka
- Bilshovyk
- Borschiv
- Bziv
- Chervonoarmiiske
- Dernivka
- Hostroluchchia
- Hryhorivka
- Khlopkiv
- Khmelovyk
- Korniivka
- Korzhi
- Lekhnivka
- Leliaky
- Lukashi
- Lukianivka
- Mala Tarasivka
- Maskivtsi
- Morozivka
- Nedra
- Paryshkiv
- Pasichna
- Peremoha
- Podillia
- Pylypcha
- Rudnytske
- Sadove
- Selychivka
- Selysche
- Semenivka
- Sezenkiv
- Shovkove
- Shvachykha
- Ustynkova Hreblia
- Veselynivka
- Vlasivka
- Voloshynivka
- Yabluneve
- Yareshky

== See also ==
- Administrative divisions of Kyiv Oblast
