= Bohdanivka, Boryspil Raion, Kyiv Oblast =

Rural locality in Kyiv Oblast, Ukraine

Bohdanivka Богданівка
- Village
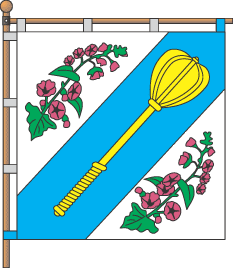
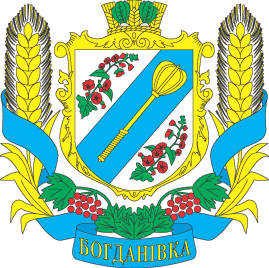
- Flag Coat of arms

- Location within Kyiv Oblast
- Coordinates: 50°13′04″N 32°00′46″E
- Country: Ukraine
- Oblast: Kyiv Oblast
- Raion: Boryspil Raion
- Hromada: Yahotyn urban hromada
- Established: 1730

Area
  - Total: 3,500 km^{2} (1,400 sq mi)
- Elevation /(average value of): 125 m (410 ft)

Population
  - Total: 782
  - Density: 0.22/km^{2} (0.58/sq mi)
- Time zone: UTC+2 (EET)
  - Summer (DST): UTC+3 (EEST)
- Postal code: 07742
- Area code: +380 4575

Bohdanivka (Ukrainian: Богданівка) is a village in Boryspil Raion in the east of Kyiv Oblast, Ukraine. It belongs to Yahotyn urban hromada, one of the hromadas of Ukraine.

Local government is administered by Bohdanivska village council. It comprises villages Bohdanivka and Koptevychivka.

== Geography ==
The village is located at the junction of three regions of Ukraine – Kyiv Oblast, Poltava Oblast and Cherkasy Oblast on the altitude of 125 metres (410 ft) above sea level. It is located at a distance of 1 kilometre (0.62 mi) from the highway in European route E40 E40 connecting Kyiv with Kharkiv. Distance from the regional center Kyiv is 115 kilometres (71 mi). It is 27 kilometres (17 mi) from Yahotyn, and 362 kilometres (225 mi) from Kharkiv.

== History ==
Bohdanivka village was founded in 1730.

Until 18 July 2020, Bohdanivka belonged to Yahotyn Raion. The raion was abolished that day as part of the administrative reform of Ukraine, which reduced the number of raions of Kyiv Oblast to seven. The area of Yahotyn Raion was merged into Boryspil Raion. Occupied by Germans in 1917-8 and 1941-3.

== Demographics ==
As of the 2001 Ukrainian census, Bohdanivka had a population of 782 inhabitants. The linguistic composition of the settlement was as follows:

Native languages in Bohdanivka
	percent
Ukrainian	97.2%
Russian	2.6%
others	0.2%

== Famous people ==
- Kateryna Vasylivna Bilokur – a Ukrainian folk artist, the People's Artist of Ukraine.
