= Kapustyntsi, Boryspil Raion, Kyiv Oblast =

Coordinates: 50°04′22″N 31°52′38″E

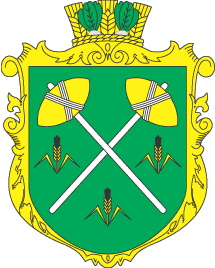
Coat of arms of Kapustyntsi

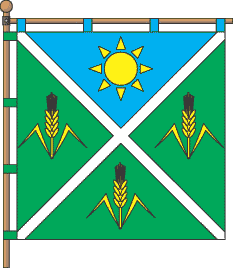
Flag of Kapustyntsi

Kapustyntsi is an old Cossack village in Boryspil Raion of Kyiv Oblast, in Ukraine. It belongs to Yahotyn urban hromada, one of the hromadas of Ukraine.

Until 18 July 2020, Kapustyntsi belonged to Yahotyn Raion. The raion was abolished that day as part of the administrative reform of Ukraine, which reduced the number of raions of Kyiv Oblast to seven. The area of Yahotyn Raion was merged into Boryspil Raion.

== History ==
The region where the village is situated has a history which has links with the cultures of Scythia, Eurasian Steppe, Reuss, Great Horde, and Cossack culture (which emerged in region in that times).

The village's earliest mention was in the mid-17th Century, in the map of Boplan (left).

=== Russian Empire ===
During the time of the Russian Empire, Kapustyntsi was registered as a cossack village a village, where registry cossacks constituted most part of population and simple, registry Christians (serfs) - minority.

=== Beginnings of Ukrainian Republic, 1917-1923 ===
After the abdication of czar and formal transformation of Russian Empire into Republic, Ukrainian Republic was proclaimed. The struggle for freedom and democracy, for new forms of government continued. This period of the village history is described in the book of Ivan Kozub "Doba i dolya" ("Epoch and destiny") of local origin.

During the civil war and struggle for democracy on the territories of former Russian Empire and new Ukrainian Republic of 1917-1923, many citizens of the village were murdered by different bandits and bandit gangs, almost all of whom claimed themselves revolutionaries.

In 1917-1923 the region and localities of the village became arena of struggle between different political and military forces, emerged on the territory of former Russian Empire. Among others - armies of Ukrainian Republic, Insurgentary Army of Ukraine of Nestor Makhno, local armies of village atamans, army of "white" general Denikin, formations of Red Army etc.

During Denikin occupation some citizens of the village were killed for supporting Ukrainian Republic and soviet government and others took arms and began to fight with forces of Denikin army for freedom and democracy in the region under yellow-blue and red flags or even flags yellow-blue from one side and red from another (see book of Kozub).

But step by step new soviet, more democratic than previous, forms of government emerged, soviet police (militia) began to work and during 1919-1923 those gangs disappeared in some or other ways. During this period some citizens of the village were killed. One for participating in gangs, while others for their service in new police (militia), among them for example Mykola Chalenko (1902-1921).

=== Ukrainian Republic before Great Patriotic War, 1921-1941 ===
During 1921-1941 newly born Ukrainian Republic became part of Soviet Union, state and union of states emerged in the Central Eurasia, on the territories of former Russian Empire.

It was period of intensive development of seeking and building of new forms of government and management in state, economic, military, cultural, education spheres. Many originees of the village took active part in this social processes. They began to serve society in all possible ways - established collective economies and farms, built schools and hospitals, studied in schools, universities and institutes, served in army. But during this period there were a lot of troubles, sins and crimes - Great Famine caused first of all by ineffective management and inadequate social and economic policy of new soviet leaders, destruction of ancient churches and temples, which constituted important part of historical-cultural heritage of Ukrainian Soviet people, prohibition of social activities of religious communities etc.

== Prominent people born in Kapustyntsi ==
Among the notable births in Kapustyntsi are:

- P. V. Byriukovych (born 1909) — Soviet psychiatrist of Ukraino-Russian origin
- Bublyk Kuzma Pavlovych (1901 - 1925) - social activist and red cossack, member of editorial board of magazine "Glory to Labor";
- Bublyk Semen Pavlovych (1909 - 1990) — Soviet professor of agriculture;
- Bublyk Yakiv Pavlovych (1905 - 1999) — teacher of Kapustyntsi;
- Dobrovolskiy Borys Semenovych (1889-1938) — Ukrainian social-democrat, member of Borotbyst party, one of organizers of free cossack troop in the village and uprising against Denikin troops in 1919, social activist, member of Pereyaslav land department, executed during Stalin's repressions;
- Kozub Ivan Gnatovych — organizer of free cossack troop in the neighborhood, first head of Boryspil volost executive committee;
- Ivan Petrovych Koziaryn — professor, doctor of medical sciences
- Grygoriy Potapovych Onyshchenko — former Vice-Head of Council of Ministers of USSR, member of Central Committee of Communist Party of Ukraine
- Grygoriy Oleksandrovych Khmelnytski — academician of Academy of Agrarian Sciences of Ukraine, doctor of veterinary sciences, professor
- Mykola Romanovych Shelych — diplomat

=== Notable residents ===
Among the notable residents in Kapustyntsi are:

- Mykhailo Kyrylovych Maslo, a famous Soviet Ukrainian teacher, poet, and member of the National Society of Writers of Ukraine also worked in the village school.

== Monuments ==
There are three monuments in Kapustyntsi, they are:

- to the victims of Civil War for people democratic government, 1917-23 (16 people);
- to the victims of Holodomor, 1932-34 (1120 people);
- to the victims of Great Patriotic War (145 people).

== Photo ==
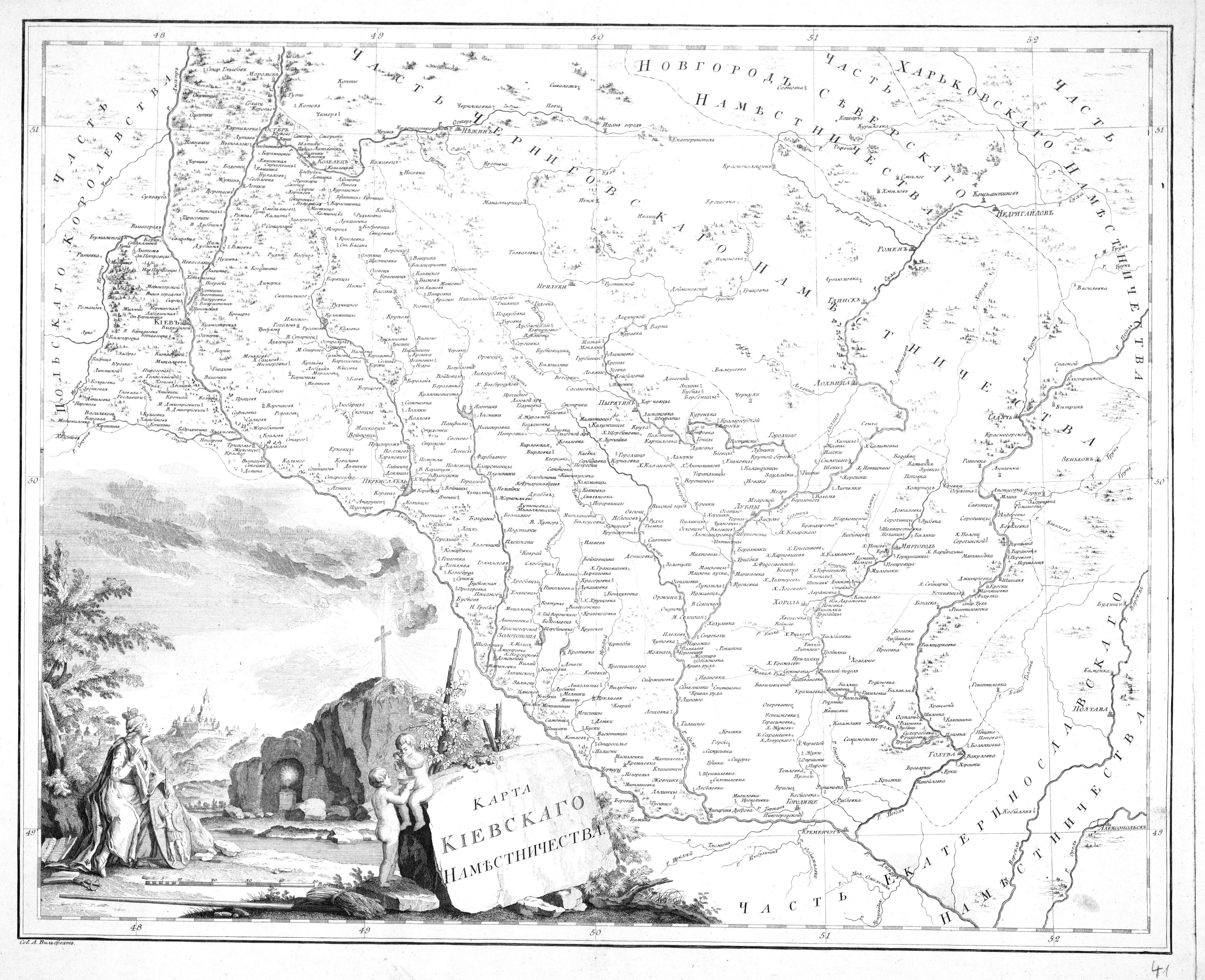
Мапа Київського намісництва 1792 року
