= Glanyshiv =

Village in Kyiv Oblast, Ukraine

Glanyshiv Гланишів
- Village
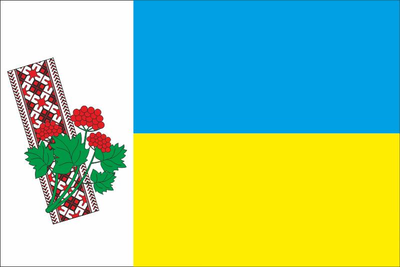
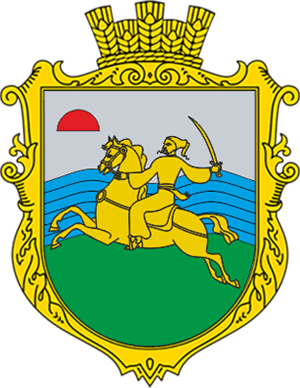
- Flag Coat of arms

- Location of Glanyshiv in Ukraine
- Coordinates: 50°9′35″N 31°29′59″E
- Country: Ukraine
- Oblast: Kyiv Oblast
- Raion: Boryspil Raion
- Founded: 1513

Area
  - Total: 291 km^{2} (112 sq mi)
- Elevation: 126 m (413 ft)

Population (2001)
  - Total: 855
- Postal code: 07220
- Area code: +380 4567

Glanyshiv (Ukrainian: Гланишів) is a village in Boryspil Raion, Kyiv Oblast, Ukraine. It belongs to Pereiaslav urban hromada, one of the hromadas of Ukraine. As of 2024, it had a population of 630.

== Naming ==
According to one legend, the village was founded by a Cossack named Glanysh who was a fugitive from the right bank of Ukraine. The name of the village was derived from Glanysh's name.

== History ==
In the "History of the Fates of the Pereyaslav Diocese" it was noted that Glanyshiv arose as a settlement in 1513. During the Cossack period the village belonged to the first Pereyaslav hundred - an administrative-territorial and military unit - of the Pereyaslav regiment of the Zaporozhian Army. In 1755, Count Cyril Razumovski restored the third Pereyaslav Hundred which included Glanyshiv.

On 25 August 1941, it was occupied by Nazi German troops, and the population that left the occupied area.

Until 18 July 2020, Glanyshiv belonged to Pereiaslav-Khmelnytskyi Raion. The raion was abolished that day as part of the administrative reform of Ukraine, which reduced the number of raions of Kyiv Oblast to seven. The area of Pereiaslav-Khmelnytskyi Raion was merged into Boryspil Raion.
