= Dvirkivshchyna =

Village in Yahotyn Raion, Kyiv Oblast, Ukraine

Coordinates: 50°15′36″N 31°52′48″E

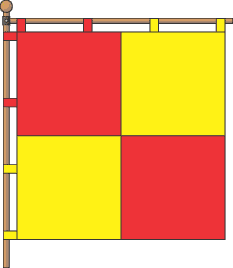
Flag

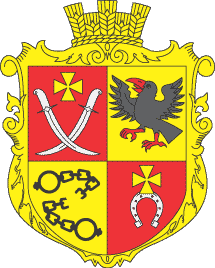
Coat of arms

Dvirkivshchyna (Ukrainian: Двірківщина) is a small Ukrainian village located in Boryspil Raion of Kyiv Oblast, 130 km east of the Ukrainian capital. It lays close to the city of Yahotyn. Dvirkivshchyna belongs to Yahotyn urban hromada, one of the hromadas of Ukraine. It also is an administrative seat of local rural community (silrada) which includes four village including Dvirkivshchyna.

== History ==
The community was formed in 1984 out of a state farm. In 2004, the village became a notable point of interest as a birthplace of Ballon d'Or winning former Ukrainian international footballer Andriy Shevchenko who played for Dynamo Kyiv, Milan and Chelsea.

Until 18 July 2020, Dvirkivshchyna belonged to Yahotyn Raion. The raion was abolished that day as part of the administrative reform of Ukraine, which reduced the number of raions of Kyiv Oblast to seven. The area of Yahotyn Raion was merged into Boryspil Raion.

== Demographics ==
As of the 2001 Ukrainian census, Dvirkivshchyna had a population of 390 inhabitants. The linguistic composition of the settlement was as follows:

Native languages in Dvirkivshchyna
	percent
Ukrainian	96.2%
Russian	3.1%
Belarusian	0.8%
others	0.0%

== Notable people ==
- Andriy Shevchenko (born 1976), Ukrainian football player
