= 2023–24 FC Chornomorets Odesa season =

FC Chornomorets Odesa
2023–24 season
- Owner: Vertex United
- General Director: Anatoly Mysyura
- Manager: Roman Hryhorchuk
- Stadium: Chornomorets Stadium
- Ukrainian Premier League: 12th of 16
- Ukrainian Cup: Semi-final
- Top goalscorer: League: Andriy Shtohrin (8); All: Andriy Shtohrin (12)
Home colours	Away colours	Third colours

The 2023–24 season was the 86th season in the club's history and the 33rd season of Odesa football club "Chornomorets" in the domestic league/cup of Ukraine. "The Sailors" competed in the 2023–24 Ukrainian Premier League and 2023–24 Ukrainian Cup.

== Season overview ==
Note: Only the dates of official matches are marked in bold.

=== July 2023 ===
- **July 30, 2023** In the 1st round of the Ukrainian Premier League, Chornomorets played in Cherkasy against local club FC LNZ and won 2–0. Bohdan Boychuk and Jon Šporn scored their first goals for Chornomorets.

=== August 2023 ===
- **August 6, 2023** In the 2nd round of the Ukrainian Premier League, playing in Kovalivka, the Sailors lost 0–2 to local side FC Kolos.
- **August 12, 2023** In the 3rd round of the Ukrainian Premier League, Chornomorets played in Odesa against FC Obolon and won 2–0. Oleksandr Vasylyev and Samson Iyede scored their first goals as part of the squad.
- **August 20, 2023** In the 4th round of the Ukrainian Premier League, playing at home, the Sailors outlasted Dynamo Kyiv, winning 3–2.
- **August 23, 2023** In the 4th preliminary round (1/16) of the 2023–24 Ukrainian Cup, Chornomorets played against Livyi Bereh, winning 2–1 and moving on to the round of 16 (1/8).
- **August 27, 2023** In the 5th round of the Ukrainian Premier League, playing in Poltava, the Sailors lost 1–2 to local side FC Vorskla.

=== September 2023 ===
- **September 1, 2023** In the 6th round of the Ukrainian Premier League, Chornomorets played in Rivne against local club Veres and lost 1–3.
- **September 16, 2023** In the 7th round of the Ukrainian Premier League, playing at home, the Sailors outlasted Polissya Zhytomyr, winning 1–0.
- **September 22, 2023** In the 8th round of the Ukrainian Premier League, Chornomorets played in Oleksandriya against local club FC Oleksandriya and won 5–1.
- **September 27, 2023** In the round of 16 (1/8) of the 2023–24 Ukrainian Cup, playing at home, the Sailors outlasted Kryvbas Kryvyi Rih, winning 2–1.
- **September 30, 2023** In the 9th round of the Ukrainian Premier League, playing at home, Chornomorets drew Zorya Luhansk 0–0.

=== October 2023 ===
- **October 8, 2023** In the 10th round of the Ukrainian Premier League, playing in Kryvyi Rih, the Sailors lost 0–1 to local side FC Kryvbas.
- October 14, 2023 Chornomorets faced FC Oleksandriya in a friendly in Odesa and lost 1–3.
- October 15, 2023 The Sailors drew FC LNZ 1–1 in a friendly in Odesa.
- **October 21, 2023** In the 11th round of the Ukrainian Premier League, Chornomorets played in Odesa against FC Mynai and won 3–0.

=== November 2023 ===
- **November 1, 2023** In the quarter-final of the 2023–24 Ukrainian Cup, playing at home, the Sailors outlasted Zorya Luhansk, winning 4–1.
- **November 5, 2023** In the 13th round of the Ukrainian Premier League, playing in Kyiv Oblast, Chornomorets lost 1–2 to Metalist 1925.
- **November 12, 2023** In the 14th round of the Ukrainian Premier League, the Sailors played in Odesa against FC Rukh and lost 2–3.
- **November 27, 2023** In the 15th round of the Ukrainian Premier League, playing in Dnipro, Chornomorets lost 2–5 to Dnipro-1.

=== December 2023 ===
- **December 3, 2023** In the 16th round of the Ukrainian Premier League, the Sailors played in Odesa against FC LNZ and lost 1–3.
- **December 10, 2023** In the 17th round of the Ukrainian Premier League, playing at home, Chornomorets outlasted FC Kolos Kovalivka, winning 1–0.

=== January 2024 ===
==== Friendlies ====
- January 12, 2024 Chornomorets – FC Petrolul Ploiești 1–0.
- January 16, 2024 Újpest FC – Chornomorets 3–1.
- January 20, 2024 FC Drita – Chornomorets 3–1.
- January 21, 2024 Chornomorets – TS Galaxy 0–4.
- January 25, 2024 Chornomorets – SCR Altach 0–2.
- January 28, 2024 Chornomorets – FC AP Brera 3–1.

=== February 2024 ===
==== Friendlies ====
- February 1, 2024 Chornomorets – FC Alashkert 1–4.
- February 10, 2024 Chornomorets – Nyva (Vinnytsia) 2–2. Chornomorets – Real Pharma (Odesa) 0–0.
- February 15, 2024 Chornomorets – Real Pharma (Odesa) 1–1.
- February 18, Chornomorets – Inhulets (Petrove) 1–3.
- February 19, 2024 Chornomorets – South Palmira 1–0.

- **February 26, 2024** In the 18th round of the Ukrainian Premier League, playing in Kyiv, Chornomorets drew FC Obolon 1–1.

=== March 2024 ===
- **March 2, 2024** In the 19th round of the Ukrainian Premier League, the Sailors played in Kyiv against FC Dynamo and lost 0–1.
- **March 9, 2024** In the 20th round of the Ukrainian Premier League, playing at home, Chornomorets lost 0–1 to FC Vorskla.
- March 10, 2024 The Sailors won against amateur FC Titan 3–2 in a friendly in Odesa.
- **March 17, 2024** In the 21st round of the Ukrainian Premier League, playing at home, Chornomorets lost 0–1 to NK Veres.
- March 18, 2024 The Sailors won against FC Real Farma 4–1 in a friendly in Odesa.
- March 23, 2024 Chornomorets won against FC Titan 3–1 in a friendly in Odesa.
- March 26, 2024 The Sailors won against FC Athletic Odesa 3–1 in a friendly in Odesa.
- **March 30, 2024** In the 22nd round of the Ukrainian Premier League, Chornomorets played in Zhytomyr against local club FC Polissya and won 4–1.

=== April 2024 ===
- **April 3, 2024** In the semi-final of the 2023–24 Ukrainian Cup, the Sailors played in Lviv against FC Shakhtar Donetsk and lost 1–4.
- **April 7, 2024** In the 23rd round of the Ukrainian Premier League, playing at home, Chornomorets outlasted FC Oleksandriya, winning 3–2.
- **April 14, 2024** In the 24th round of the Ukrainian Premier League, the Sailors played in Kyiv Oblast against FC Zorya and lost 0–1.
- **April 20, 2024** In the 25th round of the Ukrainian Premier League, playing at home, Chornomorets lost 1–2 to FC Kryvbas.
- **April 27, 2024** In the 26th round of the Ukrainian Premier League, the Sailors played in Mynai against local club FC Mynai and lost 0–2.

=== May 2024 ===
- **May 1, 2024** In the postponed 12th round of the Ukrainian Premier League, playing in Kyiv Oblast as home team, Chornomorets lost 1–4 to FC Shakhtar Donetsk.
- **May 5, 2024** In the 27th round of the Ukrainian Premier League, the Sailors as guest team played in Kyiv Oblast against FC Shakhtar Donetsk and lost 0–3.
- May 6, 2024 Chornomorets won against South Palmira 2–1 in a friendly in Odesa.
- **May 12, 2024** In the 28th round of the Ukrainian Premier League, playing at home, the Sailors outlasted Metalist 1925, winning 3–0.
- May 15, 2024 Chornomorets lost against FC Real Pharma 4–5 in a friendly in Odesa.
- **May 19, 2024** In the 29th round of the Ukrainian Premier League, playing in Lviv, the Sailors lost 0–2 to local side FC Rukh.
- May 23, 2024 Chornomorets won against Chornomorets (U-19) 2–1 in a friendly in Odesa.
- **May 25, 2024** In the 30th round of the Ukrainian Premier League, playing at home, the Sailors lost 0–2 to SC Dnipro-1.

== Pre-season and friendlies ==
Win Draw Loss

- July 1, 2023 Chornomorets – Real Pharma Odesa 3–0
- July 5, 2023 Chornomorets – South Palmira 3–1
- July 8, 2023 Chornomorets – LNZ Cherkasy 0–0
- July 12, 2023 Chornomorets – Nyva Vinnytsia 2–1
- July 15, 2023 Chornomorets – Inhulets Petrove 3–4
- July 19, 2023 Chornomorets – Real Pharma Odesa 1–0
- July 22, 2023 Oleksandriya – Chornomorets 4–5

== Competitions ==
=== Ukrainian Premier League ===
==== League Table ====
Pos	Team	Pld	W	D	L	GF	GA	GD	Pts	Qualification or relegation
1	Shakhtar Donetsk (C)	30	22	5	3	63	24	+39	71	Qualification for the Champions League league stage (Note: Since already qualified Real Madrid won the Champions League, Shakhtar Donetsk was promoted to the Champions League league phase as the champion with the highest coefficient in Champions League qualifying.)
2	Dynamo Kyiv	30	22	3	5	72	28	+44	69	Qualification for the Champions League second qualifying round
3	Kryvbas Kryvyi Rih	30	17	6	7	51	30	+21	57	Qualification for the Europa League third qualifying round (Note: Since the 2023–24 Ukrainian Cup winners (Shakhtar Donetsk) finished in the top two, the Europa League spot was passed to the third-placed team, and the second Conference League second qualifying round spot was passed to the fifth-placed team.)
4	Dnipro-1	30	14	10	6	40	27	+13	52	Qualification for the Conference League second qualifying round (Note: SC Dnipro-1 that withdrew from all tournaments of the 2024–25 season due to financial hardship after finishing 4th in the league qualified for the Conference League second qualifying round, however it was awarded technical losses in both matches (0:3).)
5	Polissya Zhytomyr	30	14	8	8	39	30	+9	50	Qualification for the Conference League second qualifying round
6	Rukh Lviv	30	12	13	5	44	31	+13	49	
7	LNZ Cherkasy	30	11	8	11	31	34	−3	41	
8	Oleksandriya	30	8	10	12	30	38	−8	34	
9	Vorskla Poltava	30	9	6	15	30	46	−16	33	
10	Zorya Luhansk	30	7	11	12	29	37	−8	32 (Note: Zorya Luhansk finished ahead of Kolos Kovalivka and Chornomorets Odesa on head-to-head points: Zorya Luhansk 7, Kolos Kovalivka 6, Chornomorets Odesa 4)	
11	Kolos Kovalivka	30	7	11	12	22	31	−9	32	
12	CHORNOMORETS ODESA	30	10	2	18	38	47	−9	32	
13	Veres Rivne (O)	30	6	10	14	31	46	−15	28	Qualification for the Relegation play-off
14	Obolon Kyiv (O)	30	5	11	14	18	41	−23	26	Qualification for the Relegation play-off
15	Mynai (R)	30	5	10	15	27	50	−23	25	Qualification for the mini tournament
16	Metalist 1925 Kharkiv (R)	30	5	8	17	32	57	−25	23	Qualification for the mini tournament

Source: upl.ua
Rules for classification: 1) Points; 2) Head-to-head points; 3) Head-to-head goal difference; 4) Head-to-head goals scored; 5) Goal difference; 6) Goals scored; 7) Draw or "Golden match" if two teams tied for title (Article 22, paragraph 3).
(C) Champions; (O) Play-off winners; (R) Relegated

==== Results summary ====
Overall								Home						Away					
Pld	W	D	L	GF	GA	GD	Pts	W	D	L	GF	GA	GD	W	D	L	GF	GA	GD
30	10	2	18	38	47	−9	32	7	1	7	21	20	+1	3	1	11	17	27	−10

Last updated: May 2024.
Source: Soccerway

==== Results by round ====
Round	1	2	3	4	5	6	7	8	9	10	11	12	13	14	15	16	17	18	19	20	21	22	23	24	25	26	27	28	29	30
Ground	A	A	H	H	A	A	H	A	H	A	H	H	A	H	A	H	H	A	A	H	H	A	H	A	H	A	A	H	A	H
Result	W	L	W	W	L	L	W	W	D	L	W	L	L	L	L	L	W	D	L	L	L	W	W	L	L	L	L	W	L	L
Points	3	3	6	9	9	9	12	15	16	16	19	19	19	19	19	19	22	23	23	23	23	26	29	29	29	29	29	32	32	32
Position	3	7	8	2	4	7	3	3	5	6	6	7	6	8	9	10	8	9	9	10	10	8	8	8	9	10	10	9	10	12

Updated to match(es) played on May 2024. Source: Soccerway
A = Away; H = Home; W = Win; D = Draw; L = Loss

==== Score overview ====
Win Draw Loss

Opposition	Home score	Away score	Aggregate score	Double
Shakhtar Donetsk	1–4	0–3	1–7	No
Dynamo Kyiv	3–2	0–1	3–3	No
Kryvbas Kryvyi Rih	1–2	0–1	1–3	No
Dnipro-1	0–2	2–5	2–7	No
Polissya Zhytomyr	1–0	4–1	5–1	Yes
Rukh Lviv	2–3	0–2	2–5	No
LNZ Cherkasy	1–3	2–0	3–3	No
Oleksandriya	3–2	5–1	8–3	Yes
Vorskla Poltava	0–1	1–2	1–3	No
Zorya Luhansk	0–0	0–1	0–1	No
Kolos Kovalivka	1–0	0–2	1–2	No
Veres Rivne	0–1	1–3	1–4	No
Obolon Kyiv	2–0	1–1	3–1	No
Mynai	3–0	0–2	3–2	No
Metalist 1925 Kharkiv	3–0	1–2	4–2	No

==== Matches ====
Win Draw Loss

30 July 2023 1	LNZ Cherkasy	0–2	Chornomorets Odesa	Cherkasy, Ukraine
15:00 EET		Report		Stadium: Cherkasy Arena; Attendance: 0 Referee: A. Romanyuk (Ivano-Frankivsk)
Note: Protocol Vlog

6 August 2023 2	Kolos Kovalivka	2–0	Chornomorets Odesa	Kovalivka, Ukraine
17:00 EET		Report		Stadium: Kolos; Attendance: 0 Referee: D. Kryvushkin (Kharkiv)
Note: Protocol Vlog

12 August 2023 3	Chornomorets Odesa	2–0	Obolon Kyiv	Odesa, Ukraine
15:00 EET		Report		Stadium: Chornomorets; Attendance: 0 Referee: D. Panchyshyn (Kharkiv)
Note: Protocol Vlog

20 August 2023 4	Chornomorets Odesa	3–2	Dynamo Kyiv	Odesa, Ukraine
17:00 EET		Report		Stadium: Chornomorets; Attendance: 0 Referee: O. Omelchenko (Sloviansk)
Note: Protocol Vlog

27 August 2023 5	Vorskla Poltava	2–1	Chornomorets Odesa	Poltava, Ukraine
17:00 EET		Report		Stadium: Vorskla named after Oleksiy Butovsky; Attendance: 0 Referee: O. Derevinsky (Kyiv)
Note: Protocol Vlog

1 September 2023 6	Veres Rivne	3–1	Chornomorets Odesa	Rivne, Ukraine
17:00 EET		Report		Stadium: Avanhard; Attendance: 0 Referee: D. Shurman (Vyshneve)
Note: Protocol Vlog

16 September 2023 7	Chornomorets Odesa	1–0	Polissya Zhytomyr	Odesa, Ukraine
15:00 EET		Report		Stadium: Chornomorets; Attendance: 0 Referee: K. Monzul (Kharkiv)
Note: Protocol Vlog

22 September 2023 8	FC Oleksandriya	1–5	Chornomorets Odesa	Oleksandriya, Ukraine
19:00 EET		Report		Stadium: CSC Nika; Attendance: 0 Referee: A. Kovalenko (Poltava)
Note: Protocol Vlog

30 September 2023 9	Chornomorets Odesa	0–0	Zorya Luhansk	Odesa, Ukraine
19:00 EET		Report		Stadium: Chornomorets; Attendance: 0 Referee: M. Balakin (Kyiv Oblast)
Note: Protocol Vlog

8 October 2023 10	Kryvbas Kryvyi Rih	1–0	Chornomorets Odesa	Kryvyi Rih, Ukraine
17:00 EET		Report		Stadium: Hirnyk; Attendance: 0 Referee: D. Shurman (Vyshneve)
Note: Protocol Vlog

21 October 2023 11	Chornomorets Odesa	3–0	FC Mynai	Odesa, Ukraine
15:00 EET		Report		Stadium: Chornomorets; Attendance: 0 Referee: V. Novokhatniy (Cherkasy Oblast)
Note: Protocol Vlog

1 May 2024 12	Chornomorets Odesa	1–4	Shakhtar Donetsk	Kyiv Oblast, Ukraine
13:00 EET		Report		Stadium: Arena Livyi Bereh; Attendance: 494; Referee: V. Romanov (Dnipro)
Note: Protocol Vlog

5 November 2023 13	Metalist 1925 Kharkiv	2–1	Chornomorets Odesa	Kyiv Oblast, Ukraine
15:00 EET		Report		Stadium: Arena Livyi Bereh; Attendance: 0 Referee: O. Sandor (Lviv)
Note: Protocol Vlog

12 November 2023 14	Chornomorets Odesa	2–3	Rukh Lviv	Odesa, Ukraine
17:00 EET		Report		Stadium: Chornomorets; Attendance: 0 Referee: A. Kovalenko (Poltava)
Note: Protocol Vlog

27 November 2023 15	Dnipro-1	5–2	Chornomorets Odesa	Dnipro, Ukraine
17:00 EET		Report		Stadium: Dnipro-Arena; Attendance: 0 Referee: K. Monzul (Kharkiv)
Note: Protocol Vlog

3 December 2023 16	Chornomorets Odesa	1–3	LNZ Cherkasy	Odesa, Ukraine
15:00 EET		Report		Stadium: Chornomorets; Attendance: 0 Referee: O. Kalyonov (Lviv)
Note: Protocol Vlog

10 December 2023 17	Chornomorets Odesa	1–0	Kolos Kovalivka	Odesa, Ukraine
15:00 EET		Report		Stadium: Chornomorets; Attendance: 0 Referee: D. Panchyshyn (Kharkiv)
Note: Protocol Vlog

26 February 2024 18	Obolon Kyiv	1–1	Chornomorets Odesa	Kyiv, Ukraine
15:30 EET		Report		Stadium: Obolon Arena; Attendance: 1,040; Referee: M. Kozyryatsky (Zaporizhzhia)
Note: Protocol Vlog

2 March 2024 19	Dynamo Kyiv	1–0	Chornomorets Odesa	Kyiv, Ukraine
15:30 EET		Report		Stadium: Valeriy Lobanovskyi Dynamo Stadium; Attendance: 1,800; Referee: A. Kovalenko (Poltava)
Note: Protocol Vlog

9 March 2024 20	Chornomorets Odesa	0–1	Vorskla Poltava	Odesa, Ukraine
13:00 EET		Report		Stadium: Chornomorets; Attendance: 0 Referee: D. Yevtukhov (Dnipro)
Note: Protocol Vlog

17 March 2024 21	Chornomorets Odesa	0–1	Veres Rivne	Odesa, Ukraine
13:00 EET		Report		Stadium: Chornomorets; Attendance: 0 Referee: A. Romanyuk (Ivano-Frankivsk)
Note: Protocol Vlog

30 March 2024 22	Polissya Zhytomyr	1–4	Chornomorets Odesa	Zhytomyr, Ukraine
15:30 EET		Report		Stadium: Tsentralnyi; Attendance: 1,384; Referee: M. Balakin (Kyiv Oblast)
Note: Protocol Vlog

7 April 2024 23	Chornomorets Odesa	3–2	FC Oleksandriya	Odesa, Ukraine
13:00 EET		Report		Stadium: Chornomorets; Attendance: 0 Referee: D. Shurman (Vyshneve)
Note: Protocol Vlog

14 April 2024 24	Zorya Luhansk	1–0	Chornomorets Odesa	Kyiv Oblast, Ukraine
15:30 EET		Report		Stadium: Arena Livyi Bereh; Attendance: 0 Referee: V. Novokhatniy (Cherkasy Oblast)
Note: Protocol Vlog

20 April 2024 25	Chornomorets Odesa	1–2	Kryvbas Kryvyi Rih	Odesa, Ukraine
15:30 EET		Report		Stadium: Chornomorets; Attendance: 0 Referee: A. Kovalenko (Poltava)
Note: Protocol Vlog

27 April 2024 26	FC Mynai	2–0	Chornomorets Odesa	Mynai, Ukraine
13:00 EET		Report		Stadium: Mynai Arena; Attendance: 520; Referee: D. Reznikov (Kamianske)
Note: Protocol Vlog

5 May 2024 27	Shakhtar Donetsk	3–0	Chornomorets Odesa	Kyiv Oblast, Ukraine
18:00 EET		Report		Stadium: Arena Livyi Bereh; Attendance: 526; Referee: A. Romanyuk (Ivano-Frankivsk)
Note: Protocol Vlog

12 May 2024 28	Chornomorets Odesa	3–0	Metalist 1925 Kharkiv	Odesa, Ukraine
15:30 EET		Report		Stadium: Chornomorets; Attendance: 0 Referee: K. Zabroda (Kyiv)
Note: Protocol Vlog

19 May 2024 29	Rukh Lviv	2–0	Chornomorets Odesa	Lviv, Ukraine
15:30 EET		Report		Stadium: Arena Lviv; Attendance: 1,150; Referee: O. Omelchenko (Sloviansk)
Note: Protocol Vlog

25 May 2024 30	Chornomorets Odesa	0–2	Dnipro-1	Odesa, Ukraine
15:30 EET		Report		Stadium: Chornomorets; Attendance: 0 Referee: M. Balakin (Kyiv Oblast)
Note: Protocol Vlog

=== Ukrainian Cup ===
==== Matches ====
Win Draw Loss

23 August 2023 Fourth preliminary round	Livyi Bereh Kyiv	1–2 (a.e.t.)	Chornomorets Odesa	Kyiv Oblast, Ukraine
13:00 EET		Report		Stadium: Arena Livyi Bereh; Attendance: 0 Referee: K. Kozoroh (Kyiv Oblast)
Note: Protocol Vlog

27 September 2023 Round of 16	Chornomorets Odesa	2–1	Kryvbas Kryvyi Rih	Odesa, Ukraine
17:00 EET		Report		Stadium: Chornomorets; Attendance: 0 Referee: S. Prychyna (Lviv Oblast)
Note: Protocol Vlog

1 November 2023 Quarter-finals	Chornomorets Odesa	4–1	Zorya Luhansk	Odesa, Ukraine
15:00 EET		Report		Stadium: Chornomorets; Attendance: 0 Referee: M. Balakin (Kyiv Oblast)
Note: Protocol Vlog

3 April 2024 Semi-finals	Shakhtar Donetsk	4–1	Chornomorets Odesa	Lviv, Ukraine
18:00 EET		Report		Stadium: Arena Lviv; Attendance: 674; Referee: V. Kopievsky (Kropyvnytskyi)
Note: Protocol Vlog

== Statistics ==
=== Clean sheets ===
The list is sorted by squad number when total clean sheets are equal.

Rank	No.	Player	Domestic League	Domestic Cup	Total
1	1	(Ukraine) Danylo Varakuta	5	0	5
2	31	(Ukraine) Oleh Bilyk	1	0	1
3	99	(Ukraine) Oleksiy Shevchenko	1	0	1
Totals			7	0	7

Source: Protocols of the matches.
