= Pereiaslav-Khmelnytskyi Raion =

Former subdivision of Kyiv Oblast, Ukraine

Pereiaslav-Khmelnytskyi Raion Переяслав-Хмельницький район
- Raion
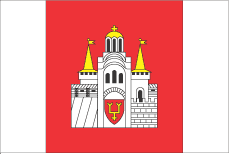
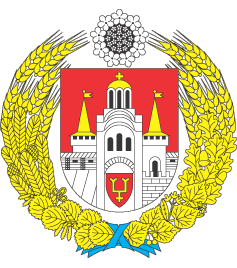
- Flag Coat of arms

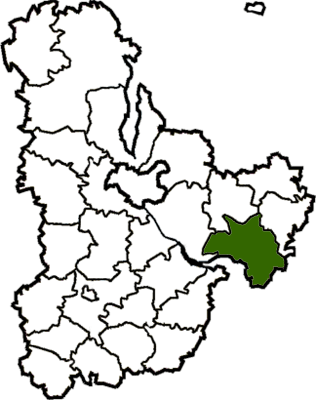
- Coordinates: 50°3′32″N 31°33′31″E
- Country: Ukraine
- Region: Kyiv Oblast
- Disestablished: 18 July 2020
- Admin. center: Pereiaslav
- Subdivisions: List: — city councils; — settlement councils; — rural councils; Number of localities: — cities; — urban-type settlements; 51 — villages; — rural settlements

Population (2020)
  - Total: 27,019
- Time zone: UTC+02:00 (EET)
  - Summer (DST): UTC+03:00 (EEST)
- Area code: +380

Pereiaslav-Khmelnytskyi Raion (Ukrainian: Переяслав-Хмельницький район) was a raion (district) in Kyiv Oblast of Ukraine. Its administrative center, Pereiaslav (from 1943 until 2019 the city was named Pereiaslav-Khmelnytskyi), was incorporated separately as a town of oblast significance and did not belong to the raion. The raion was abolished on 18 July 2020 as part of the administrative reform of Ukraine, which reduced the number of raions of Kyiv Oblast to seven. The area of Pereiaslav-Khmelnytskyi Raion was merged into Boryspil Raion. The last estimate of the raion population was 27,019 (2020 est.).

At the time of disestablishment, the raion consisted of four hromadas,

- Divychky rural hromada with the administration in the selo of Divychky;
- Studenyky rural hromada with the administration in the selo of Studenyky;
- Tashan rural hromada with the administration in the selo of Tashan;
- Tsybli rural hromada with the administration in the selo of Tsybli.
