= Bziv =

Rural locality in Kyiv Oblast, Ukraine

Bziv Бзів
- Village
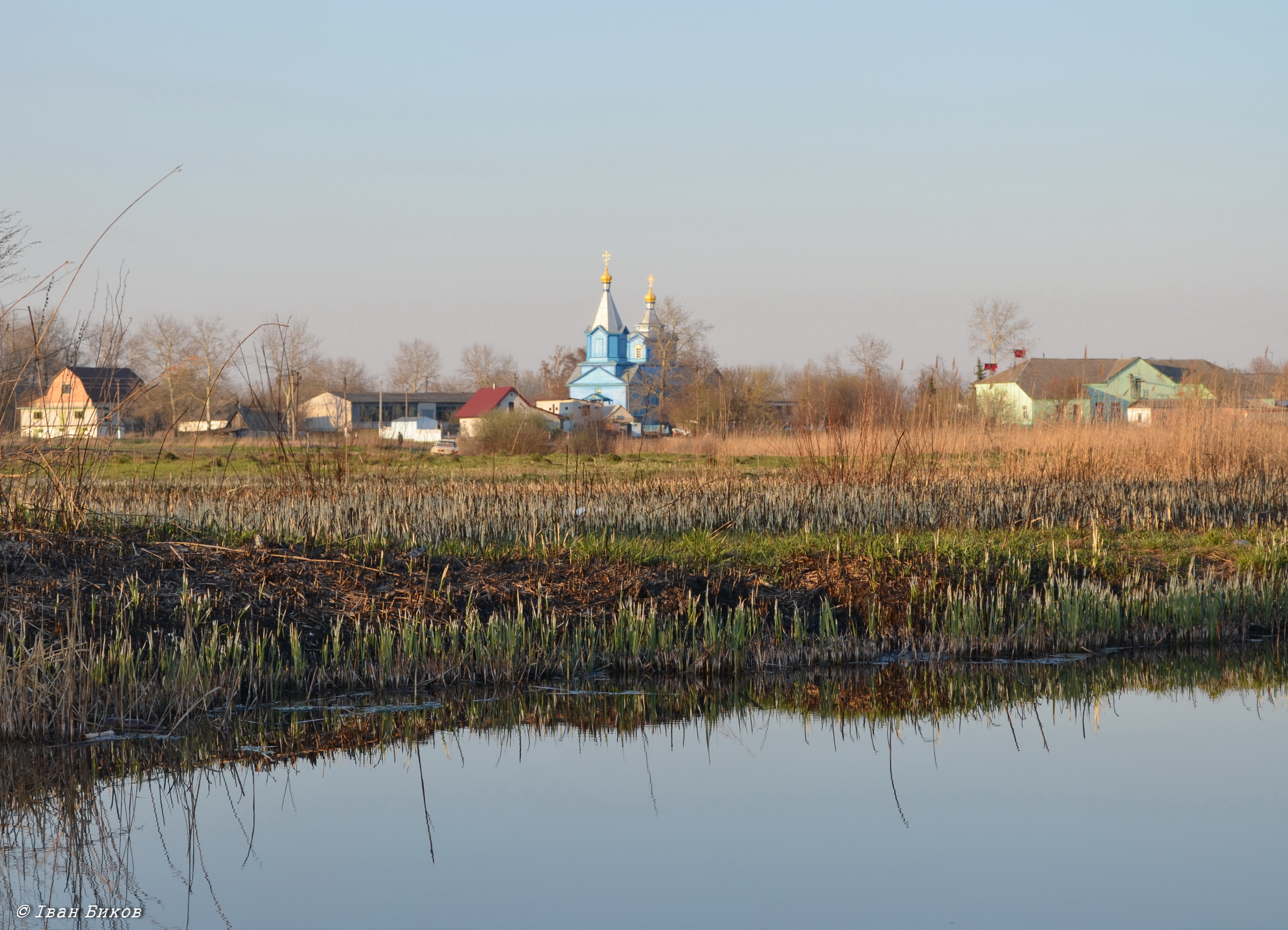

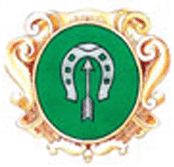
- Coat of arms

- Location within Kyiv Oblast Location within Ukraine
- Coordinates: 50°18′54″N 31°13′1″E
- Country: Ukraine
- Oblast: Kyiv Oblast
- Raion: Brovary Raion
- Hromada: Baryshivka settlement hromada

Area
  - Total: 2.82 km^{2} (1.09 sq mi)

Population (2023)
  - Total: 800
  - Density: 280/km^{2} (730/sq mi)
- Time zone: UTC+2 (EET)
  - Summer (DST): UTC+3 (EEST)
- Postal code: 07527
- Area code: +380 80447

Bziv (Ukrainian: Бзів) is a village in Brovary Raion of Kyiv Oblast, Ukraine. It is 61 kilometres (38 mi) by road southeast of Kyiv and 9.6 kilometres (6.0 mi) southwest of the settlement of Baryshivka. It belongs to Baryshivka settlement hromada, one of the hromadas of Ukraine. Bziv is noted for its blue-green wooden Saint Nicholas Church, which is an architectural monument of national significance.

== History ==
The village was first mentioned on January 27, 1688. During the Cossack period, until 1781, the village was part of the Baryshivka Hundred of the Pereyaslav Regiment. Following the abolition of the Cossack regimental system, the village became part of Oster district in the Kiev Governorate. By 1787 it had a population of 272. In the 19th century it became part of Pereyaslav district in Poltava Governorate and is shown on a map of 1812.

Some 3000 hectares of land was reported in Bziv in 1917, and in 1929 a collective farm was established in the village and by 1932 there were two collective farms, Chervonyi Klin and Novoselytsia. According to the available and available archival documents for 1932 and June–October 1933, 100 surnames have been established.

Until 18 July 2020, Bziv belonged to Baryshivka Raion. The raion was abolished that day as part of the administrative reform of Ukraine, which reduced the number of raions of Kyiv Oblast to seven. The area of Baryshivka Raion was merged into Brovary Raion.

== Economy ==
In 1970, The History of Cities and Villages of the Ukrainian SSR encyclopedia noted the Morozov Poultry Farm in the area and that 19 rural workers had received government awards for achievements in the development of agriculture in the post-war years.

== Landmarks ==
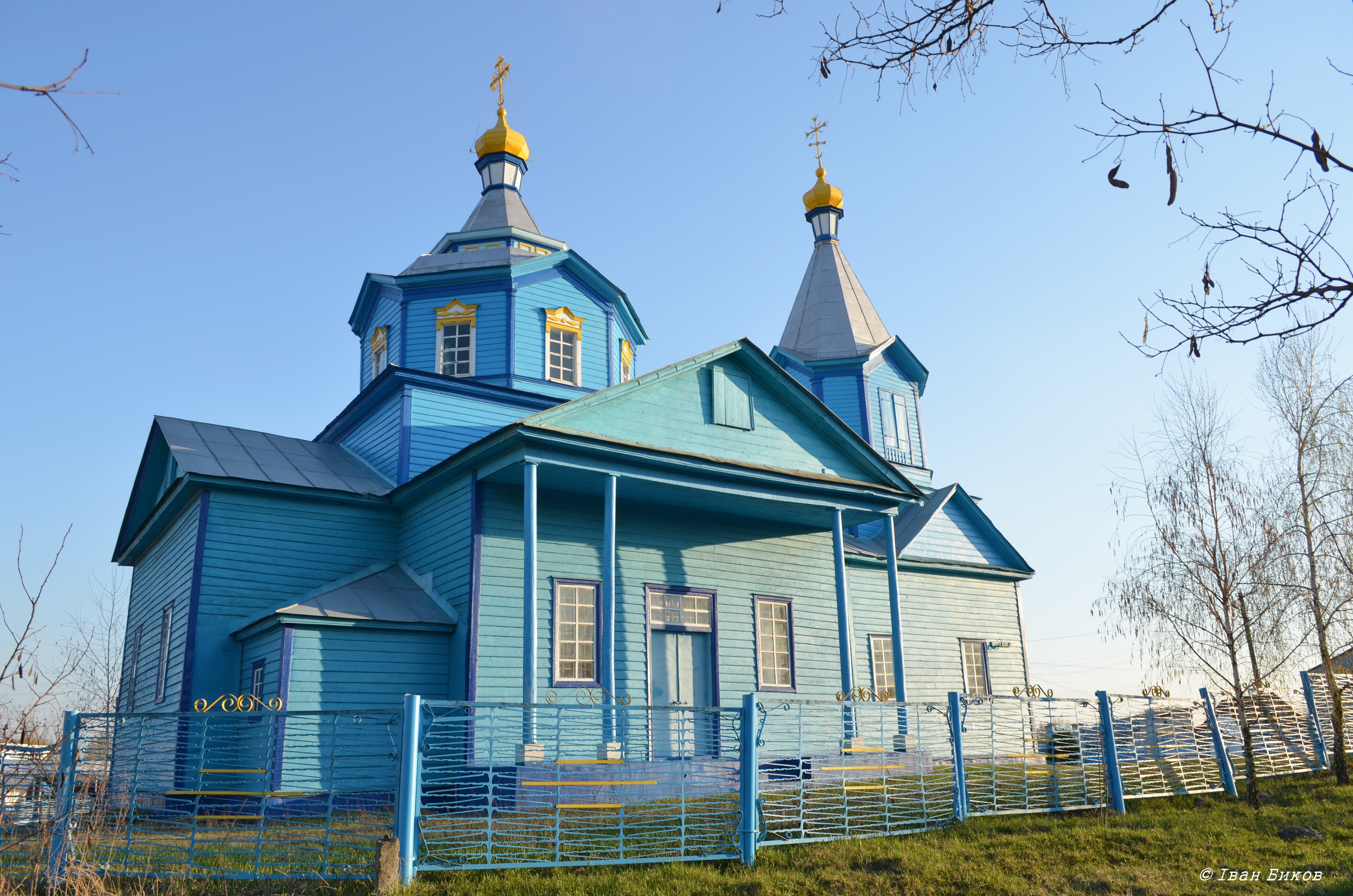
St Nicholas Church

It contains the double-domed blue-green painted Saint Nicholas Church, a national Cultural Heritage Monument. It underwent restoration work in 1901 which was conducted by Kyiv-Pechersk Monastery, to which the church belonged, and the church and the chapel became a single building. During WWII, Nazi prisoners were held in the church and it is one of only four wooden churches in the former Soviet Union built without nails to survive the war.

Also of note in the village are the Mass grave of Soviet soldiers in Bziv near the church and a thatched house, which are also Cultural Heritage monuments, and the Buynok Cultural Centre.

== Transport ==
North of Bsiv there is Novotroianda railway station at Morozivka on the Kyiv-Poltava railway.

== Notable people ==
- Alexander Serdyuk (1900-1988) - actor
