= Lukianivka, Brovary Raion =

Rural locality in Kyiv Oblast, Ukraine

Coordinates: 50°29′30″N 31°22′45″E

Lukianivka (Ukrainian: Лук'янівка) is a small village in the Brovary Raion, Kyiv Oblast, Ukraine. It is approximately 60 km away from Kyiv and 40.5 km away from Brovary. Lukianivka belongs to Baryshivka settlement hromada, one of the hromadas of Ukraine. According to the 2001 Population Census, it had a population of 849 people.

Until 18 July 2020, Lukianivka belonged to Baryshivka Raion. The raion was abolished in July 2020 as part of the administrative reform of Ukraine, which reduced the number of raions of Kyiv Oblast to seven. The area of Baryshivka Raion was merged into Brovary Raion.

== Russian invasion of Ukraine ==
During the 2022 Russian invasion of Ukraine, Russian troops took control of the settlement and started making their way to Brovary. They were later repelled and the village was taken back under control of Ukrainian authorities. During this time, it was being shelled.
