= Prystolychchia rural hromada =

Prystolychna rural hromada Пристолична сільська громада
- Hromada
- Interactive map of Prystolychna rural hromada
- Country: Ukraine
- Oblast: Kyiv Oblast
- Raion: Boryspil Raion

Area
  - Total: 104.3 km^{2} (40.3 sq mi)

Population (2020)
  - Total: 10,994
  - Density: 105.4/km^{2} (273.0/sq mi)
- Settlements: 8
- Villages: 8

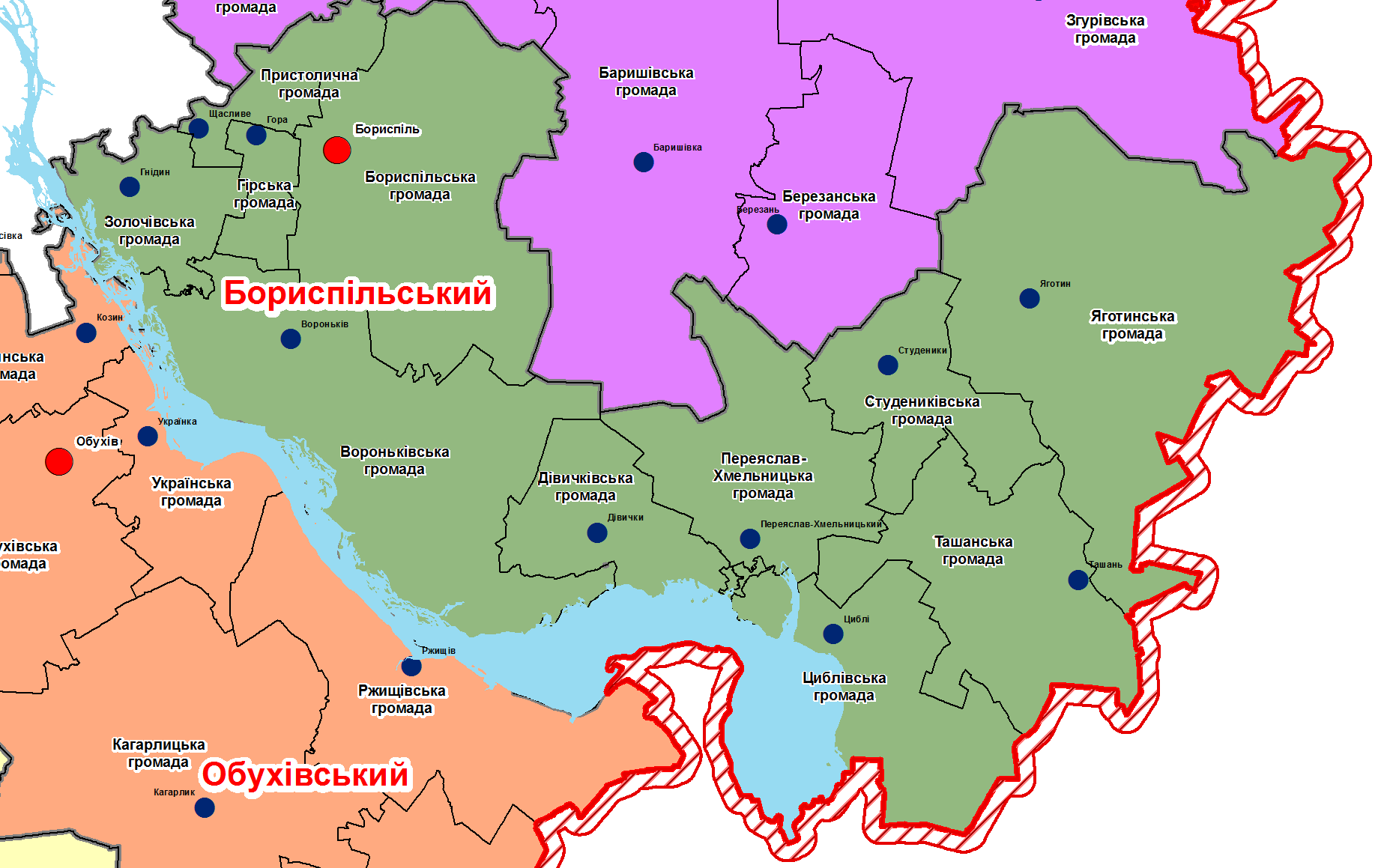
Map of the Boryspil Raion

Prystolychna rural hromada (Ukrainian: Пристолична сільська громада, romanized: Prystolychna silska hromada, IPA: [prestɔˈɫɪt͡ʃnɐ sʲilʲˈsʲka ɦrɔˈmadɐ]), also informally called Prystolychchia (Пристоличчя, Prystolychchia, [prestɔˈɫɪt͡ʃʲːɐ]) or Prystolychka (Ukrainian: Пристоличка, romanized: Prystolychka, IPA: [prestɔˈɫɪt͡ʃkɐ]), is a hromada of Ukraine, located in Boryspil Raion, Kyiv Oblast. Its administrative center is the village of Shchaslyve. It covers 104.3 square kilometres (40.3 mi^{2}) and had a population of 10,994 as of 2020.

== Name ==
The Ukrainian adjective пристолична (prystolychna) literally means "perimetropolitan", whilst the derived noun пристоличчя (prystolychchia) denotes "perimetropolitan lands"; the hromada is so designated because of its adjacency to the Ukrainian capital, Kyiv.

== History and location ==
The Cabinet of Ministers of Ukraine established the hromada on 12 June 2020 by order "On Determining Administrative Centers and Approving the Territories of Territorial Hromadas (Communities) in Kyiv Oblast". It was a part of the nationwide administrative-territorial reform in Ukraine that started in 2014 and culminated in 2020. The newly created territorial community united three former administrative–territorial units known as silrady, namely Shchaslyve silrada, Velyka Oleksandrivka silrada, and Dudarkiv silrada.

Prystolychchia hromada is located right between Kyiv (westside) and Boryspil (eastside) along the highway M03. To the north is located Brovary Raion, and to the south are two other hromadas of Boryspil Raion: Zolocha and Hora. Besides the M03 highway, a railway used by the Kyiv Boryspil Express stretches through the hromada's territory.

== Composition ==
Located in the Boryspil Raion, the hromada contains eight settlements, all of which are villages:

- Bezuhlivka
- Chubynske
- Dudarkiv
- Mala Oleksandrivka
- Prolisky
- Shchaslyve
- Velyka Oleksandrivka
- Zaimyshche

== Economy ==
On the territory of the hromada are located the following enterprises:

- Boryspil Bus Factory
- Fozzy Group hypermarket
- Arsenal Arena football complex

== Tourist attractions ==
- Pavlo Chubynskyi landscape zakaznik

== See also ==
- List of hromadas of Ukraine
