= Chubynske =

Rural locality in Kyiv Oblast, Ukraine

Chubynske Чубинське
- Interactive map of Chubynske
- Location in Ukraine Chubynske (Ukraine)
- Coordinates: 50°23′00″N 30°51′12″E
- Country: Ukraine
- Oblast: Kyiv Oblast
- Raion: Boryspil Raion
- Hromada: Prystolychchia rural hromada
- Elevation: 136 m (446 ft)

Population (2001 census)
  - Total: 791
  - Estimate (2023-01-01): 2,243
- Time zone: UTC+2 (EET)
  - Summer (DST): UTC+3 (EEST)
- Postal code: 08321
- Area code: +380 4595

Chubynske (Ukrainian: Чубинське) is a selo located in Boryspil Raion, Kyiv Oblast, Ukraine. It is the birthplace of Pavlo Chubynsky in honour of whom the village was renamed in 1992 (until then, Nova Oleksandrivka, Нова Олександрівка). Chubynske belongs to Prystolychchia rural hromada, one of the hromadas of Ukraine.

== Demographics ==
Native language as of the Ukrainian Census of 2001:

- Ukrainian 89.46%
- Russian 10.54%
