= Dovha Hreblya =

Rural locality in Kyiv Oblast, Ukraine

Dovha Hreblya Довга Гребля
- Coordinates: 50°10′34″N 31°30′42″E
- Country Oblast Raion: Ukraine; Kyiv Oblast; Boryspil Raion; Pereiaslav urban hromada
- Founded: 1787

Area
  - Total: 0.09 km^{2} (0.035 sq mi)
- Elevation: 100 m (330 ft)

Population (2014)
  - Total: 20
- Area code: +380 4567

Dovha Hreblya (Ukrainian: Довга Гребля), formerly Lenine, is a village in Pereiaslav urban hromada, Boryspil Raion, Kyiv Oblast of Ukraine. Population is 5 (2024).
