= Hnidyn =

Village in Kyiv Oblast, Ukraine

Hnidyn Гнідин
- Village
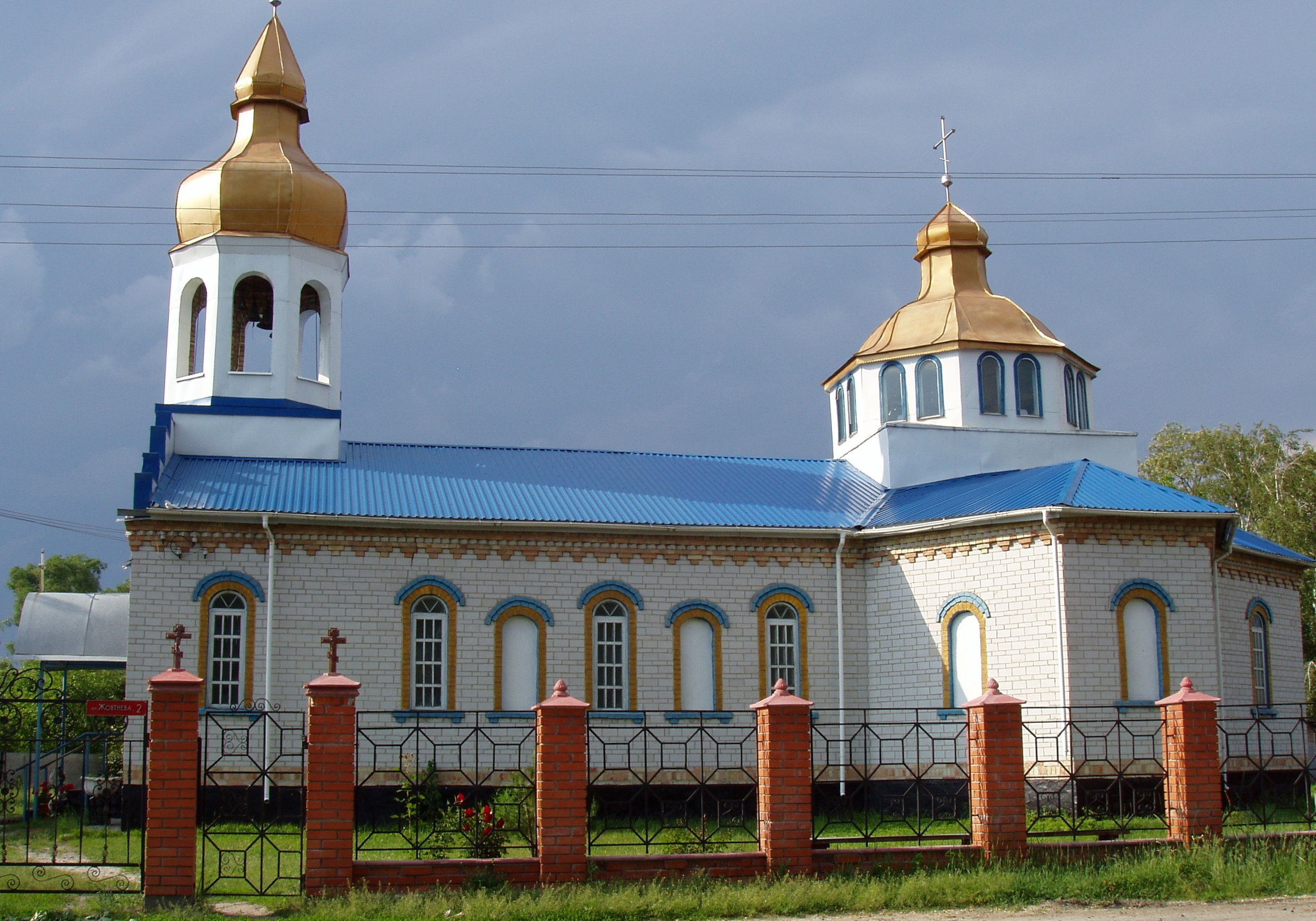
- Saint Nicholas Church

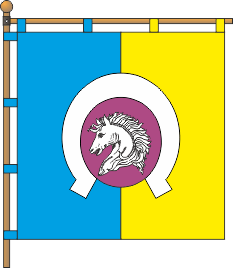
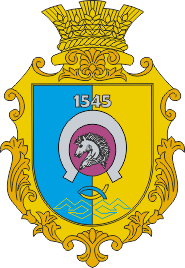
- Flag Coat of arms

- Location in Ukraine Hnidyn (Ukraine)
- Coordinates: 50°19′55″N 30°42′51″E
- Country: Ukraine
- Oblast: Kyiv Oblast
- Raion: Boryspil Raion
- Elevation: 140 m (460 ft)

Population (2001)
  - Total: 2,348
- Time zone: UTC+2 (EET)
  - Summer (DST): UTC+3 (EEST)
- Postal index: 08340
- Area code: +380-4595

Hnidyn (Ukrainian: Гнідин) is a selo in Boryspil Raion, Kyiv Oblast, Ukraine. It hosts the administration of Zolochivska rural hromada, one of the hromadas of Ukraine.

== Demographics ==
Native language as of the Ukrainian Census of 2001:

- Ukrainian 96%
- Russian 3.66%
- Others 0.21%
