= Arena Livyi Bereh =

Stadium in Hnidyn, Ukraine

- Арена Лівий берег
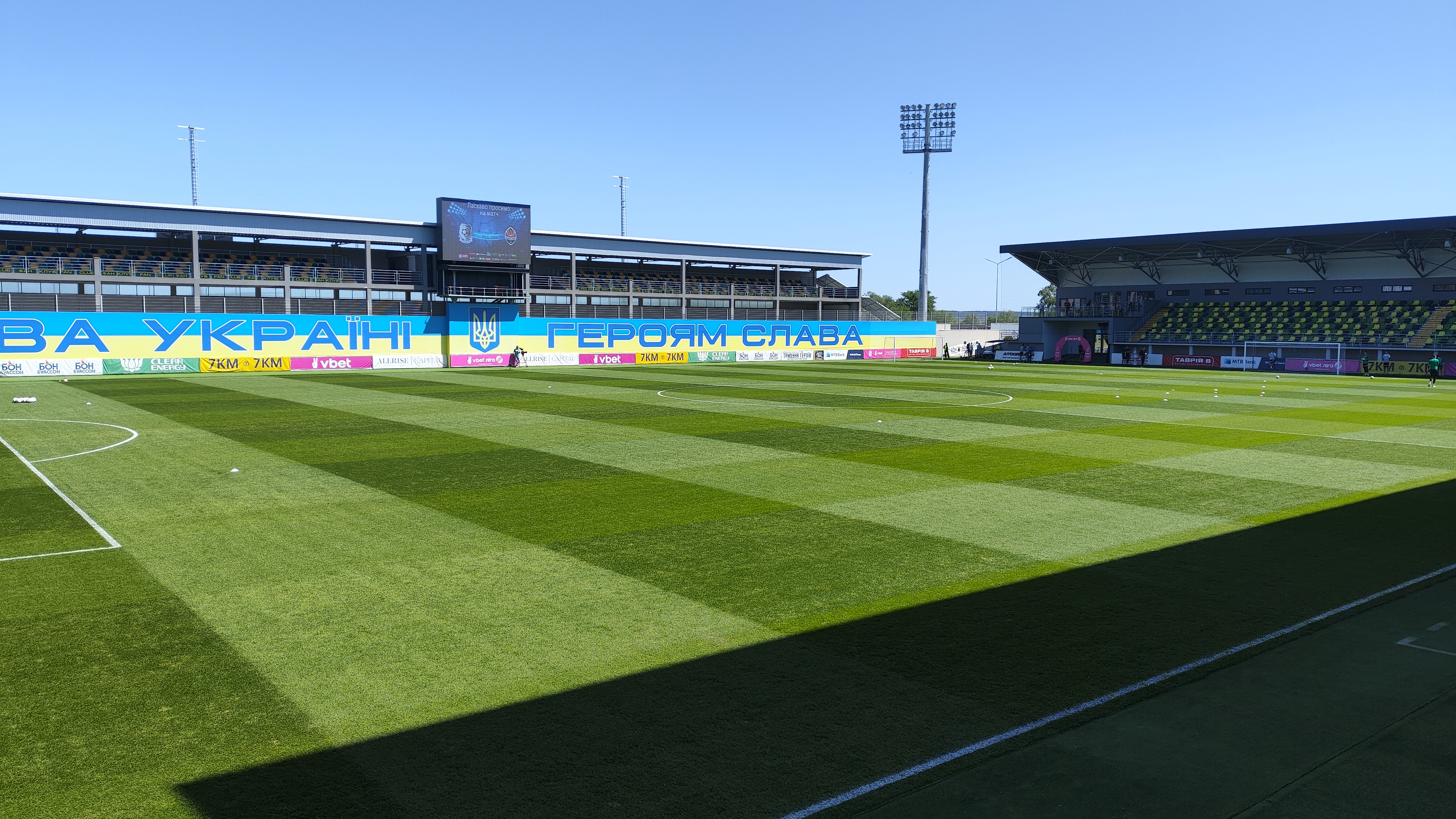
- Interactive map of Arena Livyi Bereh
- Location: Kyiv Oblast, Ukraine
- Coordinates: 50°19′28″N 30°38′59″E
- Capacity: 4,700
- Surface: Grass

Construction
- Built: 2021–2022
- Opened: 2022; 4 years ago

Tenants
- FC Livyi Bereh Kyiv (2022–present); FC Shakhtar Donetsk (2024–present, temporary)

Arena Livyi Bereh (Ukrainian: Арена Лівий берег) is a football stadium in Kyiv Oblast, Ukraine. It is the home stadium of FC Livyi Bereh. The football stadium was opened on October 15, 2022. The arena has a natural grass field with heating, stands for 4,700 seats and a lighting system of 1,600 lux.

The stadium is located just outside of the city of Kyiv, next to the Kyivan neighborhood Osokorky. It is part of the Zolochivska rural hromada and its Mlynovo residential neighborhood.

In the 2023/24 season, in addition to the matches of the Livyi Bereh team, the arena hosted the home games of the Ukrainian Premier League teams Metalist 1925 Kharkiv and Zorya Luhansk. In the 2024/25 season the stadium will host matches of FC Livyi Bereh and Shakhtar Donetsk.
