= Zolochivska rural hromada =

Zolochivska rural hromada Золочівська сільська громада
- Hromada
- Interactive map of Zolochivska rural hromada
- Country: Ukraine
- Oblast: Kyiv
- Raion: Boryspil

Area
  - Total: 148.4 km^{2} (57.3 sq mi)

Population (2020)
  - Total: 5,851
  - Density: 39.43/km^{2} (102.1/sq mi)
- Settlements: 3
- Villages: 3

Zolochivska rural hromada (Ukrainian: Золочівська сільська громада) is a hromada (community) of Ukraine, located in Boryspil Raion, Kyiv Oblast. Its administrative center is the village of Hnidyn. The hromada (community) is directly adjacent to the city of Kyiv by bordering on its southeastern outskirts of Darnytskyi District.

== Description ==
It has an area of 148.4 square kilometres (57.3 mi^{2}) and a population of 5,851, as of 2020. Due to its proximity to Kyiv, the hromada is part of the Kyiv bigger urban and semi-urbanized areas. Big areas of hromada are part of wetlands of Dnieper River which winds its river course over it. The community was named after the old Zolocha River, a left tributary of the Dnieper (now Zolocha is an oxbow lake). Just north of the hromada passes one of the main transportation artery Kyiv–Kharkiv, while just east of it is located the Boryspil International Airport.

The hromada contains 3 settlements, and a cottage (dacha) community:

- Hnidyn
- Petropavlivske
- Vyshenky
- Vyshenky cottage community

The hromada (community) was formed in 2020 by uniting two administrative-territorial rural councils of Hnidyn and Vyshenky (contained 2 villages), part of the 2019–2021 administrative reform in Ukraine. Administratively centered in Hnidyn, the newly created hromada was named as Zolochivska. The hromada is further divided into 2 starosta okruhas: Vyshenky and Petropavlivske.

The hromada borders:

- to its east – Prystolychchia and Hora rural hromadas,
- to its north – Darnytskyi District of Kyiv (Bortnychi and Nyzhni Sady cottage community),
- to its south – Voronkiv rural hromada,
- to its west (over Dnieper river) – Holosiivskyi District of Kyiv (Koncha-Zaspa),
- to its southwest (over Dnieper river) – Kozyn settlement hromada of Obukhiv Raion and Kozyn landscapre preserve.

In 2022 the Kyiv city football club Livyi Bereh built couple football stadiums on the territory of Zolochivska hromada making them the club's home stadiums. Following the 2022 Russian aggression against Ukraine, the stadium also became a home to other sports organizations including the UPL FC Zorya Luhansk and FC Metalist 1925 Kharkiv.

== See also ==
- List of hromadas of Ukraine
