= Shchaslyve, Boryspil Raion, Kyiv Oblast =

Rural locality in Kyiv Oblast, Ukraine

Coordinates: 50.3789°N 30.7894°E

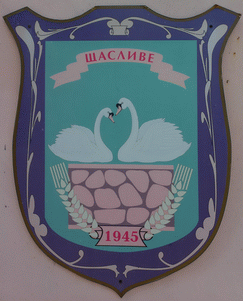
Coat of arms

Shchaslyve (Ukrainian: Щасливе) is a village in Boryspil Raion, Kyiv Oblast that borders Kyiv city. It hosts the administration of Prystolychchia rural hromada, one of the hromadas of Ukraine. Along with a settlement Prolisky, it composes the Shchaslyve rural council which is the biggest council in the district.

The village and the council are located along the Kyiv-Kharkiv highway M03 on the way to the Boryspil International Airport.

The village contains sports facility Knyazha Arena and used to house the FC Knyazha Shchaslyve. Since 2014 in Shchaslyve plays the FC Arsenal-Kyiv.

Along with its neighbor Prolisky, the village was created on 28 December 1945 as sections of the Bortnychi soviet farm. In 1953, the site of today's village was a vacant lot used by the military for parachute jumps. The first structures were dugouts (zemlianky), excavated by hand, and later people began building barracks. The barracks were made of wood and have not survived to the present day; however, the first brick building in the village was a dormitory, which has survived to this day. Oleksandr Petrovych Lutskyi is considered the first official resident of Shchaslyve to have been born right here. The "Bortnychi" soviet farm began its operations in 1959. It reached its peak development in 1964. For the first time, a farm for elite dairy cattle was established at the Bortnychi soviet farm. The Institute of Breeding and Genetics was involved in the work. The Bortnychi soviet farm was awarded the Order of Lenin.

By a decision of the Bortnychi Village Council dated August 13, 1968—adopted at the 8th plenary session of the 11th convocation—the names of the villages, Shchaslyve and Prolisky, were approved.

Until 1987, along with Prolisky, Shchaslyve was part of the Bortnychi rural council (silrada). Around 1988, Bortnychi became a neighborhood of Kyiv city. At the same time, Shaslyve and Prolisky were reorganized into the Shchaslyve rural council (silrada). In 2020, along with the Velyka Oleksandrivka rural council (silrada) and the Dudarkiv rural council (silrada), the Shchaslyve rural council (silrada) was organized into the Prystolychchia rural hromada.
