= Kateryna Bilokur =

Ukrainian artist (1900–1961)

Kateryna Bilokur Катерина Бiлокур
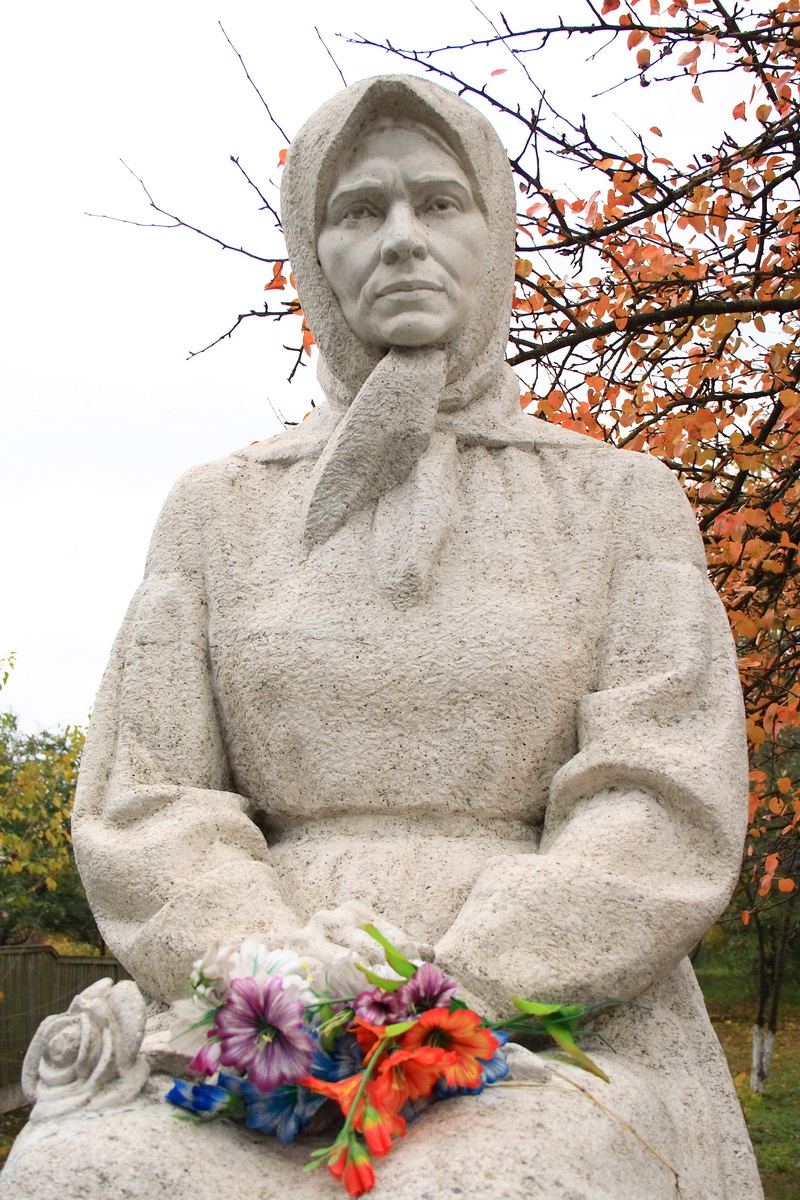
- Statue of Bilokur by her nephew Ivan Bilokur in Bohdanivka, Boryspil Raion, Kyiv Oblast
- Born: 7 December [O.S. 24 November] 1900; Bohdanivka, Poltava Governorate, Russian Empire
- Died: 9 June 1961 (aged 60); Bohdanivka Yahotyn Raion, Kyiv Oblast, Ukrainian SSR
- Awards: People's Artist of Ukraine

Kateryna Vasylivna Bilokur (Ukrainian: Катерина Василівна Білокур; 7 December [O.S. 24 November] 1900 – 9 June 1961) was a Ukrainian folk artist, painter and poet born in the Poltava Governorate. After an unpromising start, her works became known in the late 1930s and 1940s for their interest in nature. Her paintings have become famous for depictions of peasant life among Ukrainian women,. Above all it was Bilokur's flowers done in oil on canvas which brought her general recognition, with critics noting, "[s]he sees the souls of flowers."

Bilokur was named People's Artist of Ukraine in 1951. Numerous sources report a popular legend that Pablo Picasso saw Bilokur's work exhibited in Paris and commented, "[i]f we had an artist of this level, we would make the whole world talk about her."

== Biography ==
She was born on 24 November (7 December), 1900 in the village Bohdanivka.

At the age of 6 or 7, Bilokur learned to read. Her family decided not to send her to school, to save money on shoes and clothes. She started drawing from a young age, though her parents frowned upon this hobby and wouldn't permit her do it. Bilokur continued drawing secretly, using old rags and coal.

"I stole a piece of white canvas from my mother and took a piece of coal... I shall draw something on one side of the rag, then I enjoy what I created, then I draw something on the other side... And this one time... I didn't draw something I saw, but rather some birds I imagined... My soul felt so happy because of what I could make up! I stared at my drawing, and laughed like crazy... That's when my parents busted me. They tore up my drawing and threw it in the oven... "What are you crazy? What are you doing? What would happen if other people saw you doing this? What devil will agree to marry you after this!.." But wherever I go, whatever I do - I have an image in my had that I simply have to draw, it follows me...I'm offended by Nature, it was cruel to me, by giving me this enormous love of holy drawing, and then took away any chance to create this marvelous work to the whole wide extent of my talent!"

She would draw decorations for a local drama club, organized by her neighbor and a distant relative, Nikita Tonkonog. Later, Bilokur would perform on the stage of this theater.

Between 1922 and 1923, Bilokur found out about the Myrhorod professional school of artistic ceramics. She selected two of her own drawings and traveled to Myrhorod: one was copy of a painting and the other a sketch of her grandfather's house, both on paper that she bought especially for this occasion. But she wasn't accepted to the school as she had no previous formal education. She returned home by foot.

The desire to draw never left her. Later, she started attending a drama class organized by two teachers who were a married couple, the Kalita.

Her parents agreed to her participating in plays, on condition that her acting would not interfere with her housework. In 1928, Bilokur heard about a drama school in Kyiv, and decided to try out her luck there. But again she was rejected for lack of previous education.

In the autumn of 1934, she attempted suicide by drowning in the river Chumgak, and her feet were damaged by the cold. After the suicide attempt, her father finally agreed to let her draw.

== Creative period ==
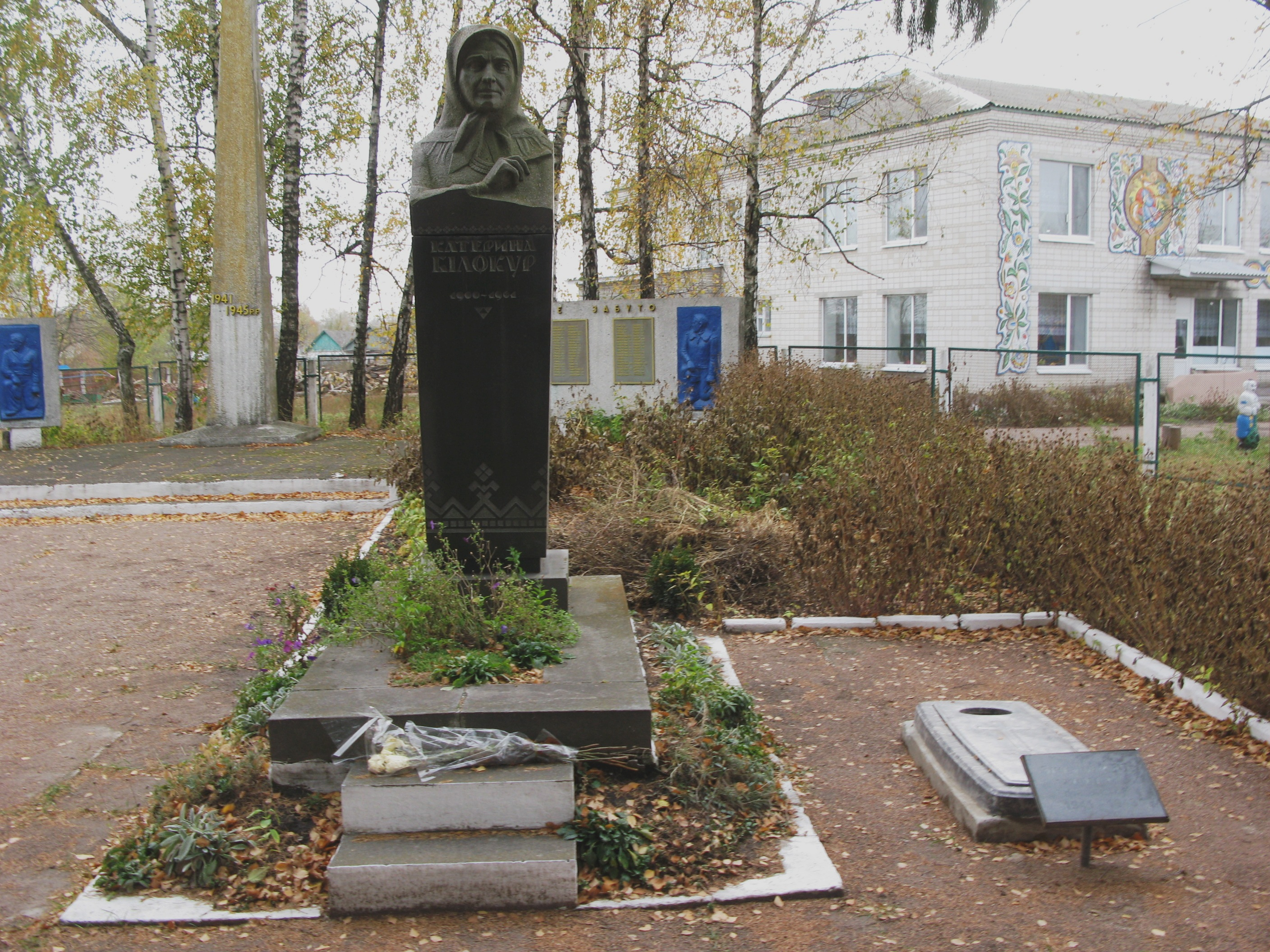
Bilokur's grave in Bohdanivka

In the spring of 1940, Bilokur heard on the radio a song called "Or was I not the viburnum on the meadow", performed by Oksana Petrusenko. The song impressed Bilokur so much that she wrote a letter to the singer, enclosing a drawing of a viburnum on a piece of canvas. Much impressed by the drawing the singer, after consulting with her friends Vasyl Kasiyan and Pavlo Tychina, contacted the Folk Art Center. Soon, an order was received in Poltava - to go to the village of Bohdanivka, find Bilokur, and inquire about her works.

Volodymyr Khitko, then head of the artistic and methodological council of the regional House of Folk Art, came to visit Bohdanivka. He showed several paintings by Kateryna Bilokur in Poltava to the artist Matvey Dontsov. In 1940 an exhibition of 11 paintings by Bilokur opened in the House of Folk Art in Poltava . The exhibition was a huge success and the artist was awarded with a trip to Moscow. Accompanied by Volodymyr Khitko, she visited the Tretyakov Gallery and the Pushkin Museum.

Bilokur was quickly recognized as a folk artist who Communist Party leaders felt captures "socialist realism" but Bilokur's work is noted for preserving the identity of the Ukrainian countryside. In 1944, Vasyl Nahai, the director of the State Museum of Ukrainian Folk Decorative Arts, visited Bohdanivka and acquired a number of paintings from Bilokur. It is thanks to this purchase that the Museum of Ukrainian Folk Decorative Arts has the best collection of Bilokur's works. In 1947 Bilokur was offered the opportunity to paint the likeness of Stalin, but declined.

In 1949, Bilokur became a member of the Artists Union of Ukraine. In the 1950's Bilokur would develop her unique watercolor technique.

In 1951, she was awarded the "Badge of Honor" and received the title of Honored Art Worker of the Ukrainian SSR. In 1954, Three paintings by Bilokur - "Tsar Kolos", "Birch", and "Kolkhoz Field" - were included in the exposition of Soviet art at the International Exhibition in Paris). It is said the works were seen by Pablo Picasso, who spoke about Bilokur as follows: "If we had an artist of this level, we would have made the whole world talk about her!". Bilokour would sign her paintings with a inscription: ‘Kateryna Bilokur painted from nature’ but, the Soviet authorities in State publications signed her paintings as‘the works of a collective farm worker from the village of Bohdanivka'

In 1956, Bilokur received the title of "People's Artist" of the Ukrainian SSR. In subsequent years, the works of Bilokur were regularly exhibited at exhibitions in Poltava, Kyiv, Moscow and other cities. Bilokur was never provided a passport to travel. Her friends would petition Communist Party leaders that she be allowed to move to Kyiv, but these efforts were denied.

Over time, Bilokur gained the friendship of artists and art critics who understood and respected her. She met them in person and corresponded with them by mail. Based on the collections of Bilokur's letters, among her pen pals were the poet Pavel Tychina and his wife Lydia Petrovna, the art critic Stefan Taranushenko, director of the Museum of Ukrainian Folk Decorative Arts, Vasily Nagai, artists Elena Kulchitskaya, Matvey Dontsov, and Emma Gurovich. In Bogdanivka, she started giving art lessons; among her students were Olga Binchuk, Tamara Ganzha, and Anna Samarskaya.

== Final years ==
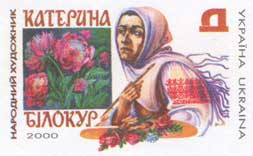
2000 Ukrainian stamp portraying Bilokur

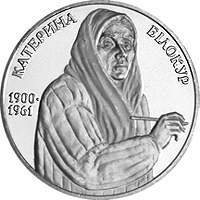
Coin of Kateryna Bilokur

In 1948, her father Vasily Bilokur died. Katheryna had lived with her sick mother for a while, and later, her brother Grigory with his wife and five children moved in with them. In the spring of 1961, her mother suffered from severe pain in the abdomen and legs. Home remedies did not help, and village pharmacy did not have the necessary medicines. In early June 1961, her 94-year-old mother died. In the same year, Bilokur was taken to the Yagotynsky regional hospital. On 10 June, she underwent an operation that did not succeed, and on the same day, Bilokur died. She was buried in her native village of Bogdanivka. The author of the tombstone is a sculptor called Ivan Gonchar.

== Paintings ==
Most of Kateryna Bilokur's paintings were of flowers. She would often combine spring and autumn elements in her paintings, and such a picture was drawn from spring to autumn. For example, six dahlias in the painting "The collective farm field" were painted over three weeks. She would not paint. cut flowers noting, "Flowers, like people, are alive, have a soul! And the torn flower is no longer a flower,".

In addition to flowers, Bilokur painted landscapes and portraits. Several times she would try depicting a story of a stork bringing a child, but abandoned this idea due to confusion from others.

In the 1950s, Bilokur made her first attempts at watercolor painting. Her best works of that time - "The Village of Bohdanivka in September", "Beyond the Village" (1956), "Early Spring" (1958), "Autumn" (1960) - are characterized by extraordinary emotional expressiveness. In the last years of her life, marked by a serious illness, Bilokur created a number of notable canvases: "Daisies" (1958), "Peonies" (1958), "Bohdaniv Apples" (1959), "Bundle of Flowers" (1960) and others.

She did not work often with watercolor and grey pencil because she was more attracted to oil paints: "I made brushes myself - I took hairs of the same length from a cat's tail. Each paint has its own brush. I figured out the canvas priming technique by myself."

== Tribute ==
On 7 December 2020, Google celebrated her 120th birthday with a Google Doodle.

In November 2024, a crater on the planet Mercury was named in her honor.
