= Pereiaslav urban hromada =

Pereiaslav urban hromada Переяславська міська громада
- Hromada
- Seal
- Interactive map of Pereiaslav urban hromada
- Country: Ukraine
- Oblast: Kyiv
- Raion: Boryspil

Area
  - Total: 260.9 km^{2} (100.7 sq mi)

Population (2020)
  - Total: 31,947
  - Density: 122.4/km^{2} (317.1/sq mi)
- Settlements: 13
- Cities: 1
- Villages: 12

Pereiaslav urban hromada (Ukrainian: Переяславська міська громада) is a hromada of Ukraine, located in Boryspil Raion, Kyiv Oblast. Its administrative center is the city Pereiaslav.

It has an area of 260.9 square kilometres (100.7 mi^{2}) and a population of 31,947, as of 2020.

The hromada contains 13 settlements: 1 city (Pereiaslav), and 12 villages:

- Velyka Karatul
- Vovchkiv
- Haishyn
- Hlanyshiv
- Hreblia
- Demiantsi
- Dovha Hreblia
- Mazinky
- Marianivka
- Pleskachi
- Kharkivtsi
- Chyrske

== See also ==
- List of hromadas of Ukraine
