= Yahotyn =

City in Kyiv Oblast, Ukraine

Yahotyn Яготин
- City
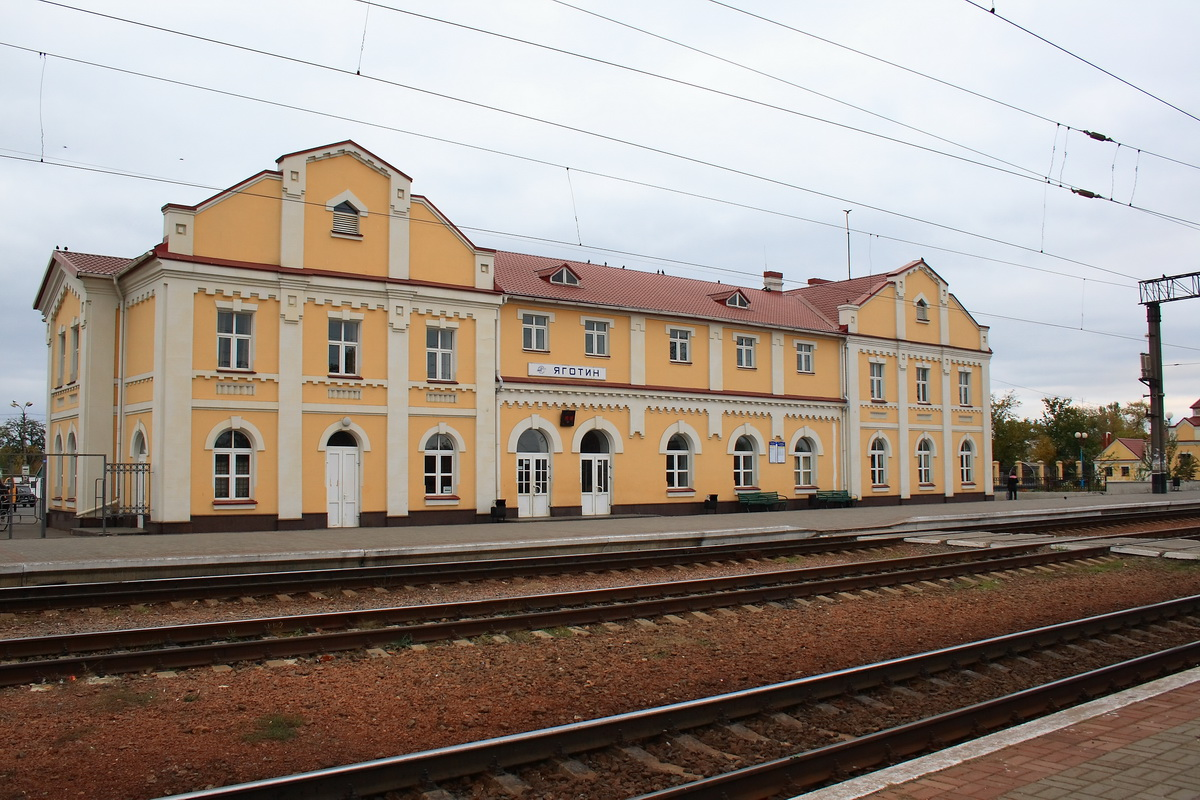
- Railway station

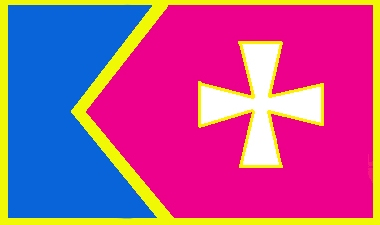
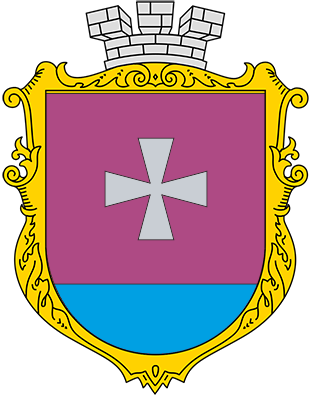
- Flag Coat of arms
- Interactive map of Yahotyn
- Location within Kyiv Oblast Location within Ukraine
- Coordinates: 50°15′25″N 31°46′54″E
- Country: Ukraine
- Oblast: Kyiv Oblast
- Raion: Boryspil Raion
- Hromada: Yahotyn urban hromada
- Founded: 1552

Area
  - Total: 57.5 km^{2} (22.2 sq mi)

Population (2022)
  - Total: 18,995
  - Density: 330/km^{2} (856/sq mi)
- Time zone: UTC+2 (EET)
  - Summer (DST): UTC+3 (EEST)
- Zip code: 07700 — 07705
- Area code: +380 4575
- Website: http://www.yagotin-city.com.ua/

Yahotyn (Ukrainian: Яготин, IPA: [jɐɦoˈtɪn]) is a city in Boryspil Raion, Kyiv Oblast (region) of Ukraine. It hosts the administration of Yahotyn urban hromada, one of the hromadas of Ukraine. In 2001, population was 23,659. The current population is 18,995 (2022 estimate).

Until 18 July 2020, Yahotyn was the administrative center of Yahotyn Raion. The raion was abolished that day as part of the administrative reform of Ukraine, which reduced the number of raions of Kyiv Oblast to seven. The area of Yahotyn Raion was merged into Boryspil Raion.

The village of Dvirkivshchyna in Boryspil Raion is birthplace to famous football player Andriy Shevchenko, who attended sports-school in Yahotyn.

== Geography ==
=== Climate ===
Climate data for Yahotyn (1981–2010)
Month	Jan	Feb	Mar	Apr	May	Jun	Jul	Aug	Sep	Oct	Nov	Dec	Year
Mean daily maximum °C (°F)	−1.6 (29.1)	−0.8 (30.6)	5.0 (41.0)	14.0 (57.2)	21.3 (70.3)	24.0 (75.2)	26.1 (79.0)	25.5 (77.9)	19.4 (66.9)	12.5 (54.5)	4.4 (39.9)	−0.5 (31.1)	12.4 (54.3)
Daily mean °C (°F)	−4.2 (24.4)	−3.8 (25.2)	1.0 (33.8)	8.9 (48.0)	15.4 (59.7)	18.6 (65.5)	20.3 (68.5)	19.4 (66.9)	13.9 (57.0)	7.9 (46.2)	1.4 (34.5)	−2.9 (26.8)	8.0 (46.4)
Mean daily minimum °C (°F)	−6.9 (19.6)	−6.8 (19.8)	−2.4 (27.7)	4.1 (39.4)	9.6 (49.3)	13.2 (55.8)	14.9 (58.8)	13.8 (56.8)	9.1 (48.4)	3.9 (39.0)	−1.1 (30.0)	−5.3 (22.5)	3.8 (38.8)
Average precipitation mm (inches)	30.8 (1.21)	30.8 (1.21)	31.6 (1.24)	43.2 (1.70)	49.6 (1.95)	83.5 (3.29)	70.4 (2.77)	55.5 (2.19)	57.9 (2.28)	39.7 (1.56)	40.2 (1.58)	37.7 (1.48)	570.9 (22.48)
Average precipitation days (≥ 1.0 mm)	7.6	7.5	7.5	7.4	7.8	9.0	8.7	6.7	7.6	6.5	7.6	7.9	91.8
Average relative humidity (%)	85.9	83.3	79.4	69.5	64.3	70.0	71.3	70.0	75.3	79.3	87.5	87.9	77.0
Source: World Meteorological Organization

== Demographics ==
As of the 2001 Ukrainian census, Yahotyn had a population of 23,556. Ethnic Ukrainians accounted for the overwhelming majority (95%) of the population, followed by Russian (4%) and Belarusian (0,4%) minorities. The exact ethnic composition of the city was as follows:

Ethnic groups in Yahotyn
	percent
Ukrainians	94.60%
Russians	4.12%
Belarusians	0.44%
others	0.71%

In terms of spoken languages, 95% of the population spoke Ukrainian, while 4% spoke Russian. The exact linguistic composition of the city was as follows:

Native languages in Yahotyn
	percent
Ukrainian	95.5%
Russian	4.1%
Belarusian	0.1%
Romani	0.1%
others	0.2%

== Notable people from Yahotyn ==
- Kateryna Bilokur (1900-1961), Ukrainian folk artist
- Olena Burkovska (born 1981), Ukrainian runner
- Anatoliy Kryvolap (born 1946), Ukrainian artist
