= Danylo Varakuta =

Ukrainian footballer

Personal information
- Full name: Danylo Andriyovych Varakuta
- Date of birth: 4 November 2001 (age 25)
- Place of birth: Kherson, Ukraine
- Height: 1.90 m (6 ft 3 in)
- Position: Goalkeeper

Team information
- Current team: Metalist 1925 Kharkiv
- Number: 30

Youth career
- 2014–2016: SDYuSShOR Mykolaiv
- 2016–2017: DYuSSh-11 Odesa
- 2017–2018: Chornomorets Odesa

Senior career*
Years	Team	Apps	(Gls)
2020–2024	Chornomorets Odesa	39	(-63)
2019–2020	→ Chornomorets-2 Odesa	12	(0)
2024–	Metalist 1925 Kharkiv	48	(0)
- * Club domestic league appearances and goals as of 3 June 2026

Danylo Andriyovych Varakuta (Ukrainian: Данило Андрійович Варакута; born 4 November 2001) is a Ukrainian professional footballer who plays as a goalkeeper for Metalist 1925 Kharkiv.

== Club career ==
Varakuta is a product of the Mykolaiv academy system. On 3 August 2020 he made his debut for the senior squad of Chornomorets Odesa in the Ukrainian First League against Metalist 1925. Before the start of the 2021–22 season, Varakuta extended his contract with Chornomorets Odesa. On 6 August 2021 he made his debut in the Ukrainian Premier League when he appeared in the starting lineup of the Odesa club against Metalist 1925. Varakuta became the UPL leader in the 2023–24 season in terms of the number of saves.

On 6 September 2024 Varakuta joined Metalist 1925.
