= Yahotyn urban hromada =

Yahotyn urban hromada Яготинська міська громада
- Hromada
- Interactive map of Yahotyn urban hromada
- Country: Ukraine
- Oblast: Kyiv
- Raion: Boryspil

Area
  - Total: 791.6 km^{2} (305.6 sq mi)

Population (2020)
  - Total: 31,154
  - Density: 39.36/km^{2} (101.9/sq mi)
- Settlements: 42
- Cities: 1
- Rural settlements: 2
- Villages: 39

Yahotyn urban hromada (Ukrainian: Яготинська міська громада) is a hromada of Ukraine, located in Boryspil Raion, Kyiv Oblast. Its administrative center is the city Yahotyn.

It has an area of 791.6 square kilometres (305.6 mi^{2}) and a population of 31,154, as of 2020.

The hromada contains 42 settlements: 1 city (Yahotyn), 39 villages:

- Bohdanivka
- Bozhky
- Voronivshchyna
- Henzerivka
- Hodunivka
- Hryhorivka
- Dvirkivshchyna
- Dziubivka
- Dobranychivka
- Zhoravka
- Zasupoivka
- Kainary
- Kapustynsi
- Koptevychivka
- Kuliabivka
- Lebedivka
- Lemeshivka
- Lozovyi Yar
- Lukomshchyna
- Nychyporivka
- Ozerne
- Panfyly
- Pluzhnyky
- Raikivshchyna
- Rozumivka
- Rokytne
- Sokolivshchyna
- Sotnykivka
- Sulymivka
- Supoivka
- Trubivshchyna
- Tuzhyliv
- Farbovane
- Fedorivka
- Chervone
- Chervone Zarichchia
- Cherkasivka
- Cherniakhivka
- Shevchenkove

And 2 rural-type settlements: Hrechanivka and Cherniakhivka.

== See also ==
- List of hromadas of Ukraine
