= Divychky rural hromada =

Divychky rural hromada Дівичківська селищна громада
- Hromada
- Interactive map of Divychky rural hromada
- Country: Ukraine
- Oblast: Kyiv Oblast
- Raion: Boryspil Raion

Area
  - Total: 262.6 km^{2} (101.4 sq mi)

Population (2020)
  - Total: 4,367
  - Density: 16.63/km^{2} (43.07/sq mi)
- Settlements: 7
- Villages: 7

Divychky rural hromada (Ukrainian: Дівичківська селищна громада) is a hromada of Ukraine, located in Boryspil Raion, Kyiv Oblast. Its administrative center is the village of Divychky.

It has an area of 262.6 square kilometres (101.4 mi^{2}) and a population of 4,367, as of 2020.

The hromada contains 7 settlements, which are all villages:

- Divychky
- Vesele
- Hrechanyky
- Yerkivtsi
- Kavkaz
- Kovalyn
- Stovpiahy

== See also ==
- List of hromadas of Ukraine
