= Baryshivka settlement hromada =

Baryshivka settlement hromada Баришівська селищна громада
- Hromada
- Interactive map of Baryshivka settlement hromada
- Country: Ukraine
- Oblast: Kyiv Oblast
- Raion: Brovary Raion

Area
  - Total: 695.4 km^{2} (268.5 sq mi)

Population (2020)
  - Total: 26,999
  - Density: 38.83/km^{2} (100.6/sq mi)
- Settlements: 28
- Villages: 27
- Towns: 1

Baryshivka settlement hromada (Ukrainian: Баришівська селищна громада) is a hromada of Ukraine, located in Brovary Raion, Kyiv Oblast. Its administrative center is the rural settlement of Baryshivka.

It has an area of 695.4 square kilometres (268.5 mi^{2}) and a population of 26,999, as of 2020.

The hromada includes 28 settlements: 1 rural settlement (Baryshivka), and 27 villages:

- Bakumivka
- Bziv
- Borshchiv
- Veselinivka
- Vlasivka
- Voloshynivka
- Hostroluchchia
- Dernivka
- Korzhi
- Korniivka
- Lukashi
- Lukianivka
- Mala Tarasivka
- Maskivtsi
- Morozivka
- Paryshkiv
- Pasichna
- Peremoha
- Podillia
- Rudnytske
- Sezenkiv
- Selychivka
- Selyshche
- Ustynkova Hreblia
- Khlopkiv
- Shvachykha
- Shovkove

== See also ==
- List of hromadas of Ukraine
