= Voronkiv rural hromada =

Voronkiv rural hromada Вороньківська селищна громада
- Hromada
- Interactive map of Voronkiv rural hromada
- Country: Ukraine
- Oblast: Kyiv
- Raion: Boryspil

Area
  - Total: 667.7 km^{2} (257.8 sq mi)

Population (2020)
  - Total: 13,806
  - Density: 20.68/km^{2} (53.55/sq mi)
- Settlements: 10
- Villages: 10

Voronkiv rural hromada (Ukrainian: Вороньківська селищна громада) is a hromada of Ukraine, located in Boryspil Raion, Kyiv Oblast. Its administrative center is the village of Voronkiv.

It has an area of 667.7 square kilometres (257.8 mi^{2}) and a population of 13,806, as of 2020.

The hromada contains 10 settlements, which are all villages:

- Voronkiv
- Vasylky
- Holovuriv
- Zherebiatyn
- Kyiliv
- Mali Yerkivtsi
- Myrne
- Protsiv
- Soshnykiv
- Stare

== See also ==
- List of hromadas of Ukraine
