= Baryshivka =

Rural locality in Kyiv Oblast, Ukraine

Baryshivka Баришівка
- Settlement
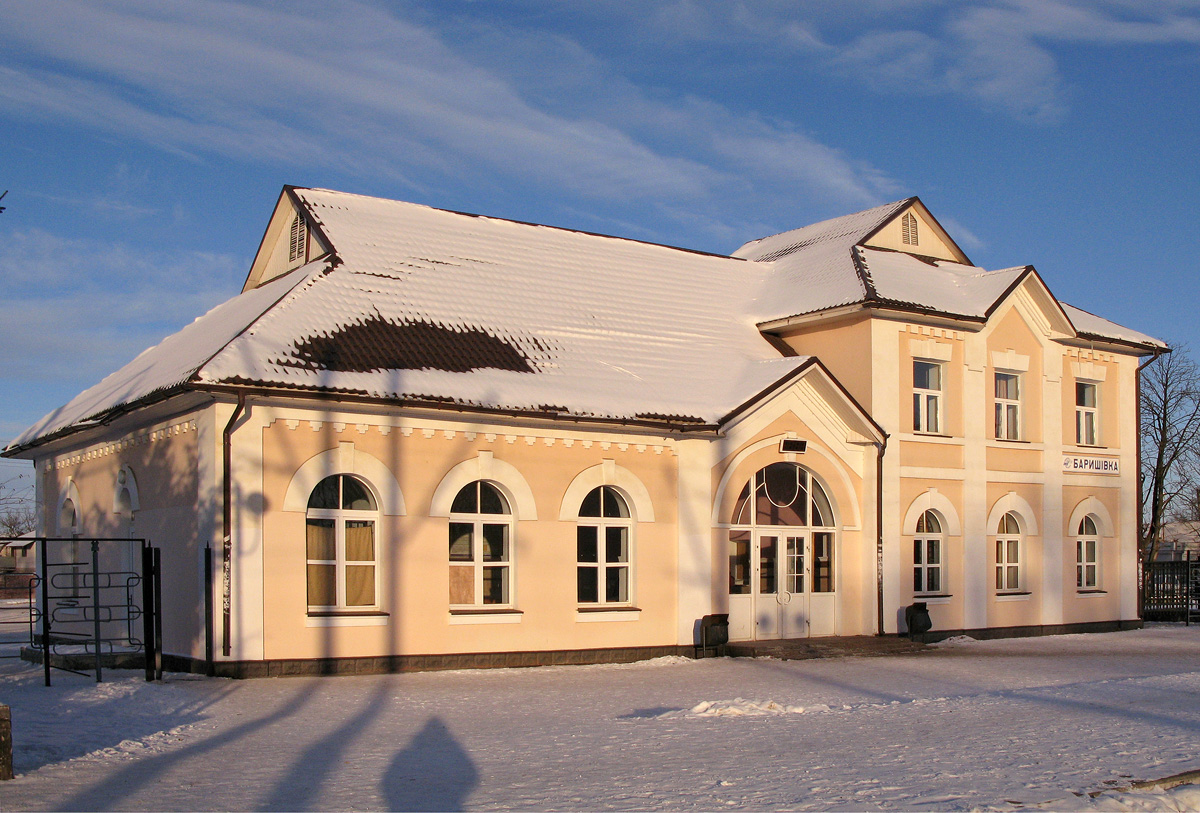
- Baryshivka Railway Station

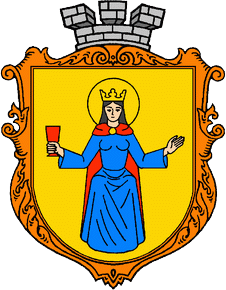
- Coat of arms

- Location within Kyiv Oblast Location within Ukraine
- Coordinates: 50°21′14″N 31°19′00″E
- Country: Ukraine
- Oblast: Kyiv Oblast
- Raion: Brovary Raion
- Founded: 1125

Area
  - Total: 5 km^{2} (1.9 sq mi)

Population (2001)
  - Total: 11,178
  - Density: 2,200/km^{2} (5,800/sq mi)
- Time zone: UTC+2 (EET)
  - Summer (DST): UTC+3 (EEST)
- Postal code: 07500
- Area code: +380 4576

Baryshivka (Ukrainian: Бáришівка; Russian: Бáрышевка) is a settlement (selyshche) in Kyiv Oblast, Ukraine. It hosts the administration of Baryshivka settlement hromada, one of the hromadas of Ukraine. Population: 10,294 (2022 estimate). In 2001, population was 11,178.

== Geography ==
Baryshivka is located upon Trubizh river.

== History ==
In 1921-1922, Baryshivka was the centre of activity of Ukrainian Neoclassicists, among them Mykola Zerov, Oswald Burghardt and Viktor Petrov.

Until 18 July 2020, Baryshivka was the administrative center of Baryshivka Raion. The raion was abolished that day as part of the administrative reform of Ukraine, which reduced the number of raions of Kyiv Oblast to seven. The area of Baryshivka Raion was merged into Brovary Raion.

Until 26 January 2024, Baryshivka was designated urban-type settlement. On this day, a new law entered into force which abolished this status, and Baryshivka became a rural settlement.

== Gallery ==
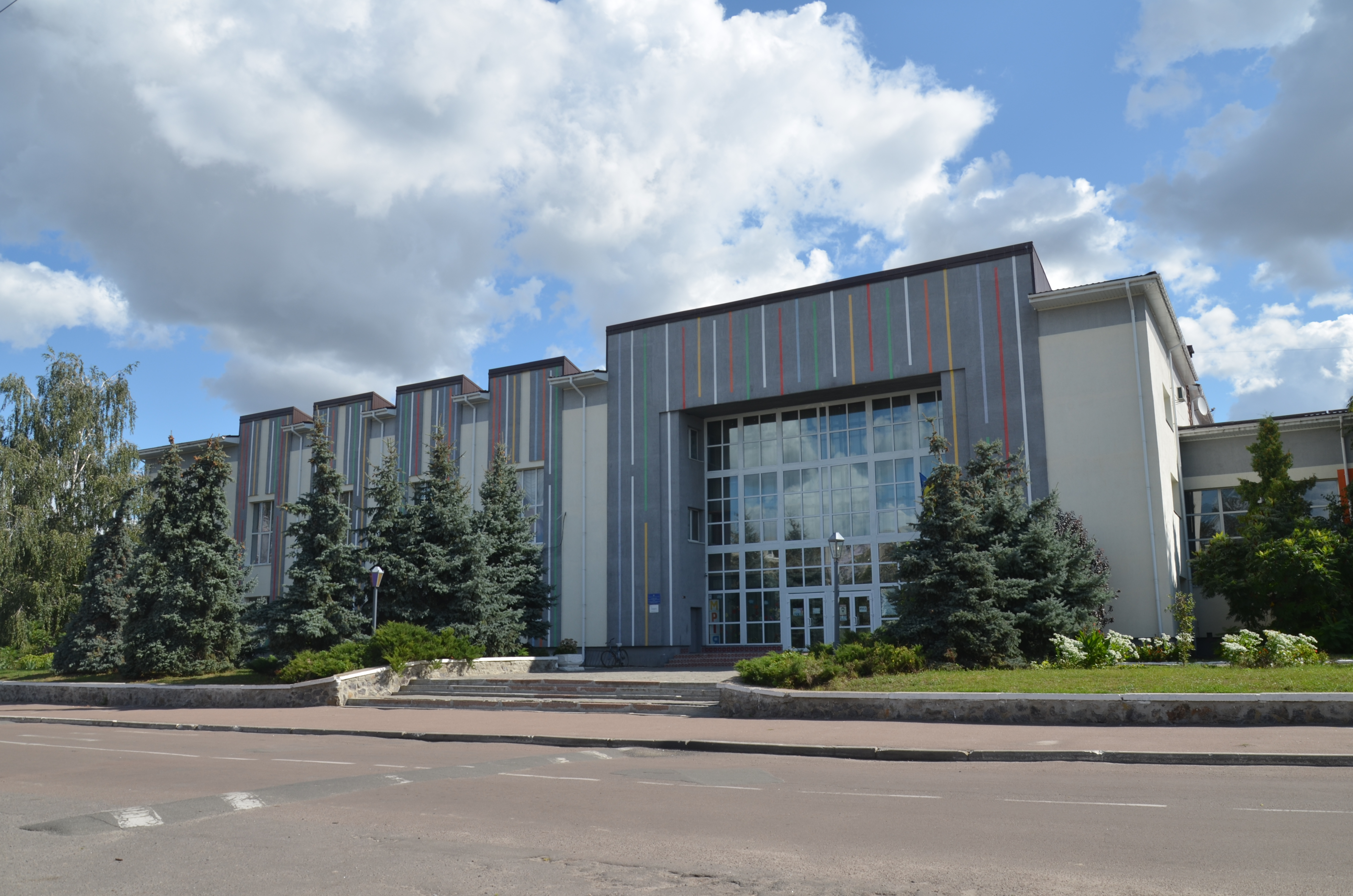
Children's creativity centre

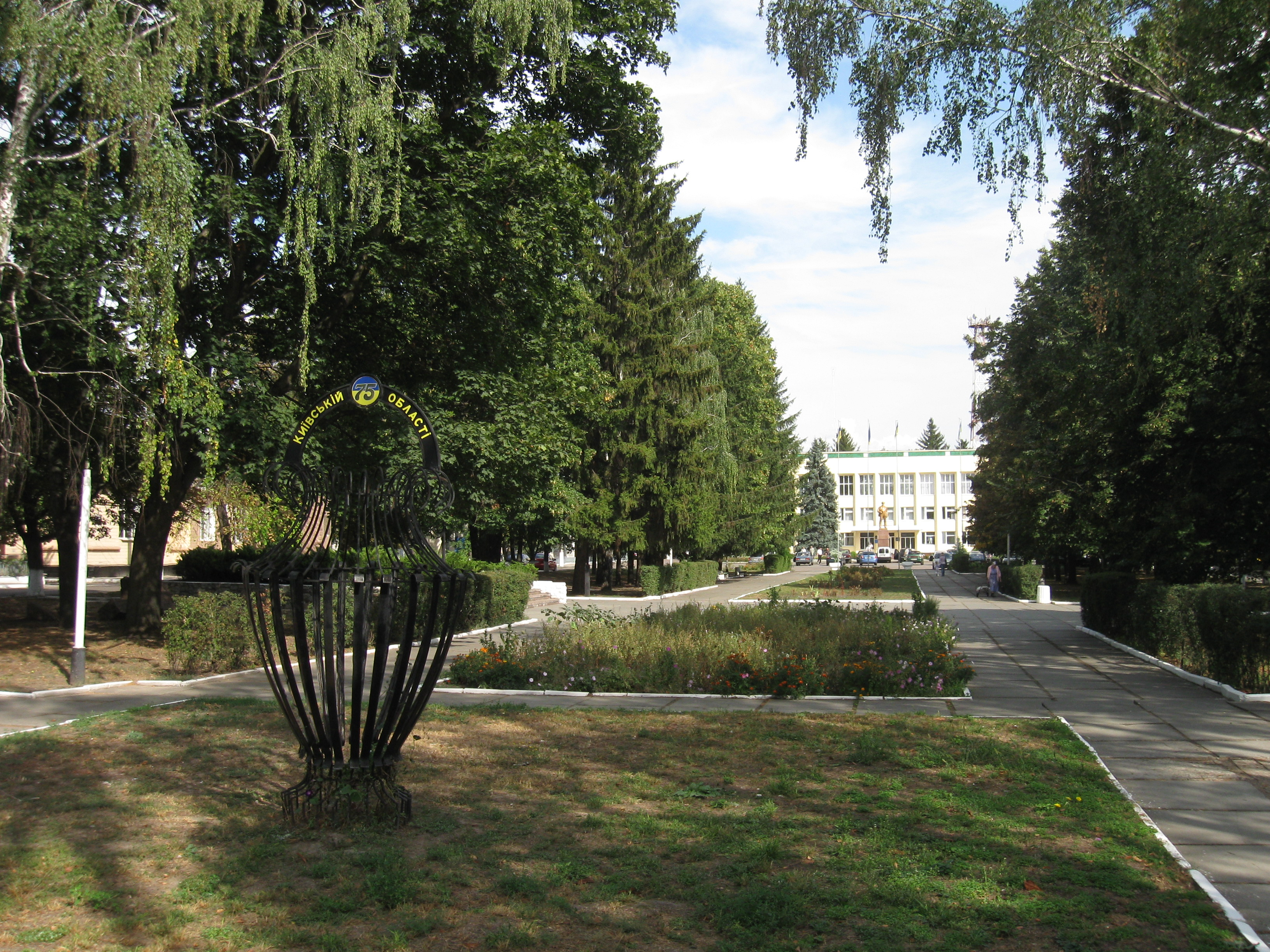
Alley in central Baryshivka

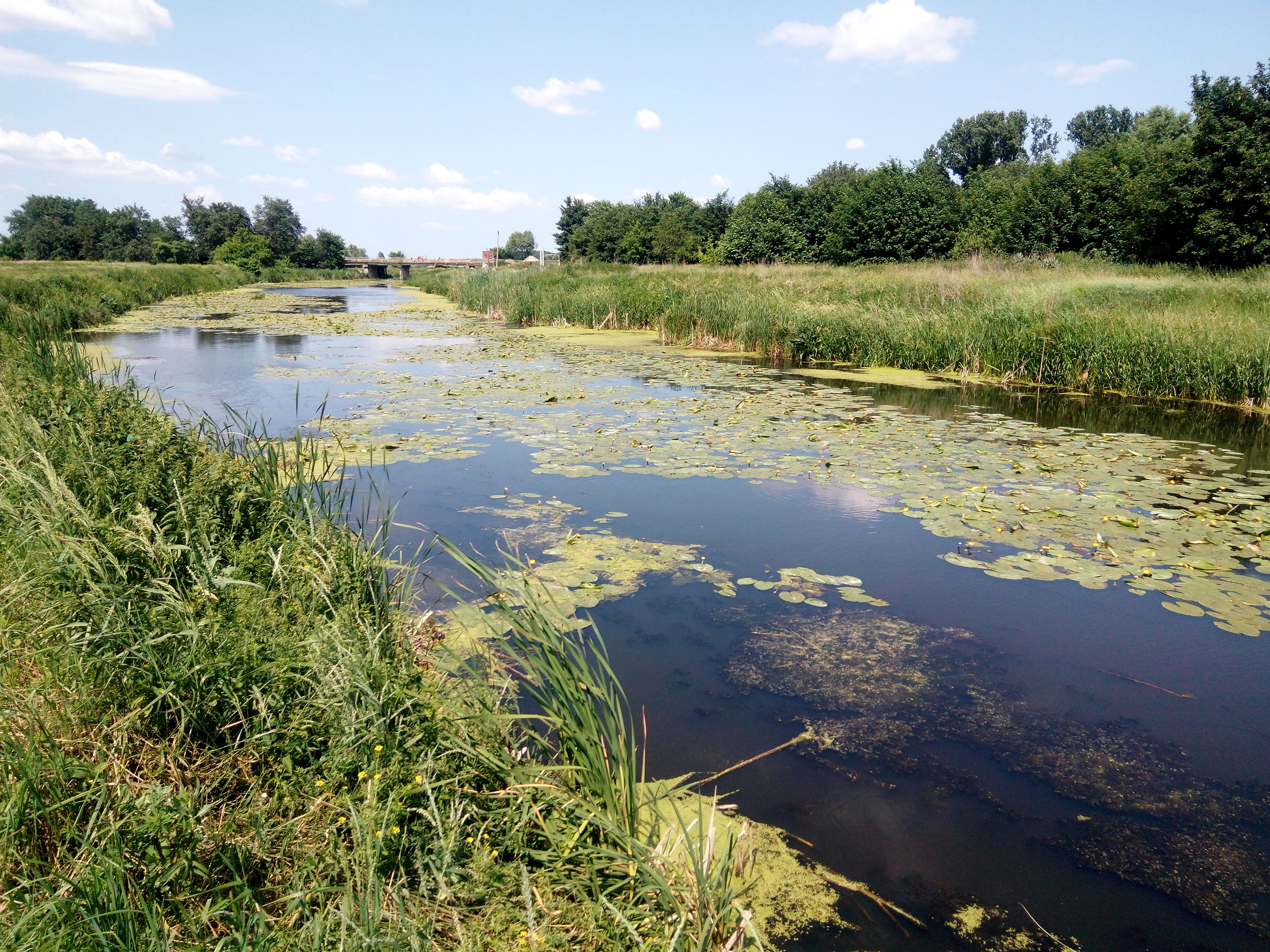
Trubizh river in Baryshivka

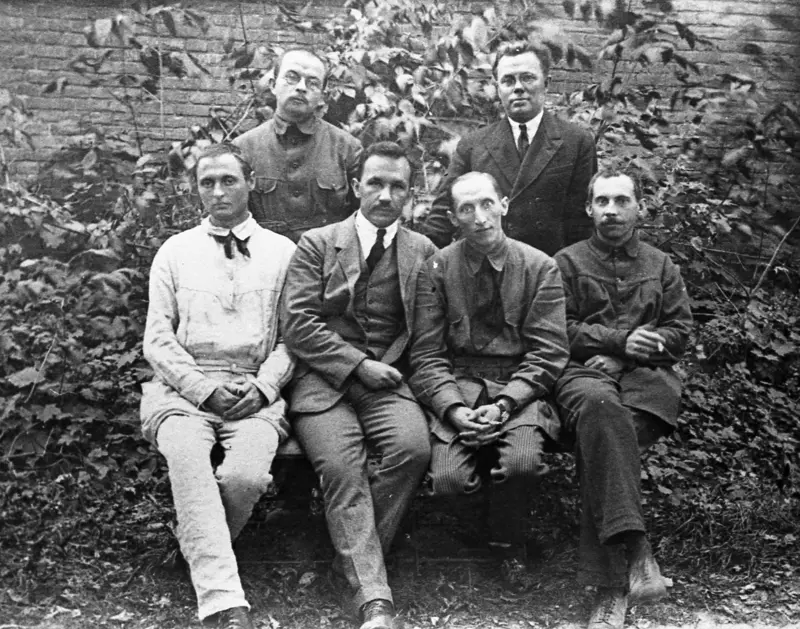
Ukrainian Neoclassicists in Baryshivka during the early 1920s
