= Tsybli rural hromada =

Tsybli rural hromada Циблівська селищна громада
- Hromada
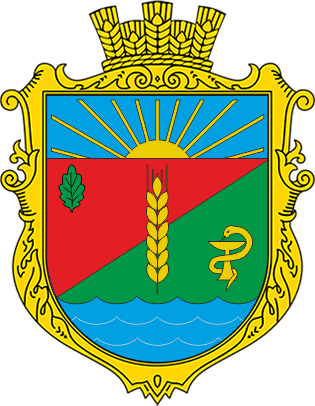
- Seal
- Interactive map of Tsybli rural hromada
- Country: Ukraine
- Oblast: Kyiv
- Raion: Boryspil

Area
  - Total: 389.4 km^{2} (150.3 sq mi)

Population (2020)
  - Total: 5,938
  - Density: 15.25/km^{2} (39.49/sq mi)
- Settlements: 7
- Villages: 7

Tsybli rural hromada (Ukrainian: Циблівська селищна громада) is a hromada of Ukraine, located in Boryspil Raion, Kyiv Oblast. Its administrative center is the village of Tsybli.

It has an area of 389.4 square kilometres (150.3 mi^{2}) and a population of 5,938, as of 2020.

The hromada contains 7 settlements, which are all villages:

- Vinyntsi
- Letsky
- Polohy-Chobitky
- Polohy-Yanenky
- Svitanok
- Khotsky
- Tsybli

== See also ==
- List of hromadas of Ukraine
