= Tashan rural hromada =

Tashan rural hromada Ташанська селищна громада
- Hromada
- Interactive map of Tashan rural hromada
- Country: Ukraine
- Oblast: Kyiv
- Raion: Boryspil

Area
  - Total: 335.3 km^{2} (129.5 sq mi)

Population (2020)
  - Total: 5,308
  - Density: 15.83/km^{2} (41.00/sq mi)
- Settlements: 16
- Villages: 16

Tashan rural hromada (Ukrainian: Ташанська селищна громада) is a hromada of Ukraine, located in Boryspil Raion, Kyiv Oblast. Its administrative center is the village of Tashan.

It has an area of 335.3 square kilometres (129.5 mi^{2}) and a population of 5,308, as of 2020.

The hromada contains 16 settlements, which are all villages:

- Vypovzky
- Voskresenske
- Horbani
- Denysy
- Mala Karatul
- Natiahailivka
- Pershe Travnia
- Polohy-Verhuny
- Polozhai
- Pomokli
- Tarasivka
- Tashan
- Travneve
- Ulianivka
- Chopylky
- Shevchenkove

== See also ==
- List of hromadas of Ukraine
