= Studenyky rural hromada =

Studenyky rural hromada Студениківська селищна громада
- Hromada
- Interactive map of Studenyky rural hromada
- Country: Ukraine
- Oblast: Kyiv
- Raion: Boryspil

Area
  - Total: 324.8 km^{2} (125.4 sq mi)

Population (2020)
  - Total: 6,964
  - Density: 21.44/km^{2} (55.53/sq mi)
- Settlements: 11
- Villages: 11

Studenyky rural hromada (Ukrainian: Студениківська селищна громада) is a hromada of Ukraine, located in Boryspil Raion, Kyiv Oblast. Its administrative center is the village of Studenyky.

It has an area of 324.8 square kilometres (125.4 mi^{2}) and a population of 6,964, as of 2020.

The hromada contains 11 settlements, which are all villages:

- Zaostriv
- Kozliv
- Leliaky
- Pereiaslavske
- Prystromy
- Semenivka
- Somkova Dolyna
- Sosnivka
- Sosnova
- Strokova
- Studenyky

== See also ==
- List of hromadas of Ukraine
