= Hora rural hromada =

Hora rural hromada Гірська селищна громада
- Hromada
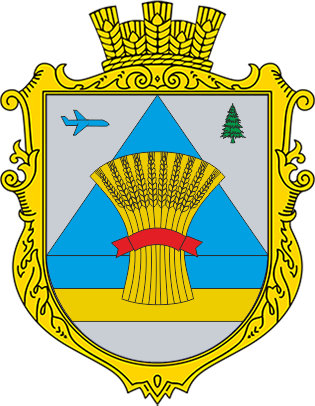
- Seal
- Interactive map of Hora rural hromada
- Country: Ukraine
- Oblast: Kyiv Oblast
- Raion: Boryspil Raion

Area
  - Total: 60.9 km^{2} (23.5 sq mi)

Population (2020)
  - Total: 6,179
  - Density: 101/km^{2} (263/sq mi)
- Settlements: 4
- Villages: 4

Hora rural hromada (Ukrainian: Гірська селищна громада) is a hromada of Ukraine, located in Boryspil Raion, Kyiv Oblast. Its administrative center is the village of Hora.

It has an area of 60.9 square kilometres (23.5 mi^{2}) and a population of 6,179, as of 2020.

The hromada contains 4 settlements, which are all villages:

- Hora
- Zatyshne
- Martusivka
- Revne

== See also ==
- List of hromadas of Ukraine
