= Yahotyn Raion =

Former subdivision of Kyiv Oblast, Ukraine

Yahotyn Raion Яготинський район
- Raion
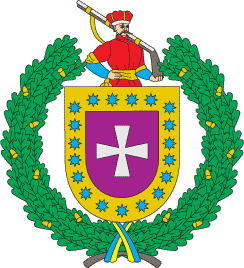
- Flag Coat of arms

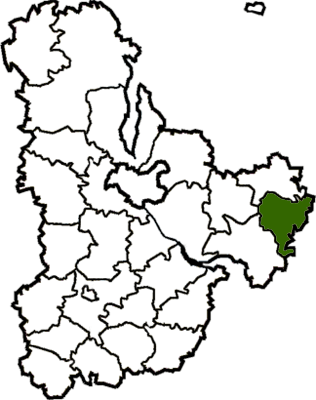
- Coordinates: 50°15′26″N 31°53′40″E
- Country: Ukraine
- Region: Kyiv Oblast
- Disestablished: 18 July 2020
- Admin. center: Yahotyn
- Subdivisions: List: — city councils; — settlement councils; — rural councils; Number of localities: — cities; — urban-type settlements; 41 — villages; — rural settlements

Population (2020)
  - Total: 31,624
- Time zone: UTC+02:00 (EET)
  - Summer (DST): UTC+03:00 (EEST)
- Area code: +380

Yahotyn Raion (Ukrainian: Яготинський район) was a raion (district) in Kyiv Oblast of Ukraine. Its administrative center was the town of Yahotyn. The raion was abolished on 18 July 2020 as part of the administrative reform of Ukraine, which reduced the number of raions of Kyiv Oblast to seven. The area of Yahotyn Raion was merged into Boryspil Raion. The last estimate of the raion population was 31,624 (2020 est.).

At the time of disestablishment, the raion consisted of one hromada, Yahotyn urban hromada with the administration in Yahotyn.
