= Boryspil Raion =

Subdivision of Kyiv Oblast, Ukraine

Boryspil Raion Бориспільський район
- Raion
- Бориспільський район (Boryspilskyi raion)
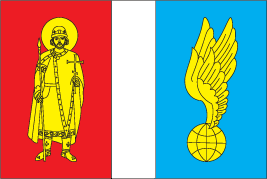
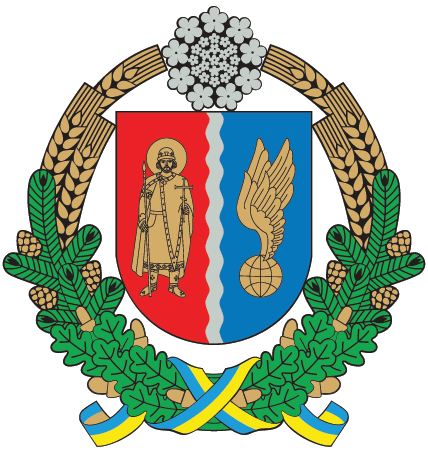
- Flag Coat of arms
- Interactive map of Boryspil Raion
- Coordinates: 50°14′24″N 30°59′39″E
- Country: Ukraine
- Oblast: Kyiv Oblast
- Established: 1923
- Admin. center: Boryspil
- Subdivisions: 11 hromadas

Government
  - Governor: Ivan Pavlovych Poliukhovych

Area
  - Total: 3,873.2 km^{2} (1,495.5 sq mi)

Population (2022)
  - Total: 203,154
  - Density: 52.451/km^{2} (135.85/sq mi)
- Time zone: UTC+02:00 (EET)
  - Summer (DST): UTC+03:00 (EEST)
- Postal index: 083
- Area code: 380-44
- Website: kyiv-obl.gov.ua

Boryspil Raion (Ukrainian: Бориспільський район, romanized: Boryspil's'kyi raion) is an administrative raion (district) in east-central Kyiv Oblast of Ukraine. Its administrative center is the city of Boryspil. Population: 203,154 (2022 estimate).

On 18 July 2020, as part of the administrative reform of Ukraine, the number of raions of Kyiv Oblast was reduced to seven, and the area of Boryspil Raion was significantly expanded. Two abolished raions, Pereiaslav-Khmelnytskyi and Yahotyn Raions, as well as the cities of Boryspil and Pereiaslav, which were previously incorporated as cities of oblast significance and did not belong to the raion, were merged into Boryspil Raion. The area of the raion before the reform was 146 square kilometres (56 mi^{2}). The January 2020 estimate of the raion population was 53,619 (2020 est.).

== Geography ==
The Boryspil raion is located in the east-central area of the Kyiv Oblast, and has a total area of 146 km^{2}.

On the raion's southern border flows the Dnieper River (Dnipro). Near the river, the raion's lowest elevation points are located. Other rivers that flow through the raion include: the left tributaries of the Dnieper: Pavlivka, Mlen, Ikva, and the right tributaries of the Trubizh River: Bochechky, Karan', Vohnyscha, Krasylivka, Al'ta, and Il'tytsia. All of the raion's rivers flow through the low-elevation territory, making all of the rivers flow more slowly. The rivers take their sources from winter snowfalls and seasonal rains. On the southernmost border of the raion is the Kaniv Reservoir, which provides electric supply to nearby areas.

Forests cover about 150 km^{2} of the raion's 146 km^{2} area.

== Demographics ==
The Boryspil raion's total population is 53,483, which includes 23,400 males, and 30,080 females. The number of pensioners totals 16,300, about 33.6% of the total population of the raion. The density of the raion's population is 364 p/km^{2}.

The national ethnic composition is: Ukrainians (95.2%), Russians (3.8%), Belarusians (0.3%) and Moldovans (0.1%).

== Culture ==
Within the Boryspil raion operates a musical school for children (in the village of Schastlyve), a school of art (in the village of Velyka Oleksandrivka) Also, a couple of educational schools operate on the territory of the raion:

- Institute of Cloning and Genetics of Animals (Ukrainian Academy of Agriculture);
- Central science-laboratory for experiments with water and ground soil (Institute of Hydrotechno, UAAN).

A festival (Argo and Kyiv's fall; Russian: Агро и Киевская осень), is held two times a year within the village of Chubynske. Within the village of Revne, is a reserved retirement village for veterans of wars. In addition, living quarters are reserved for children of homeless children and children of poor families in the villages of Revne, Abaievykh, and Stare.

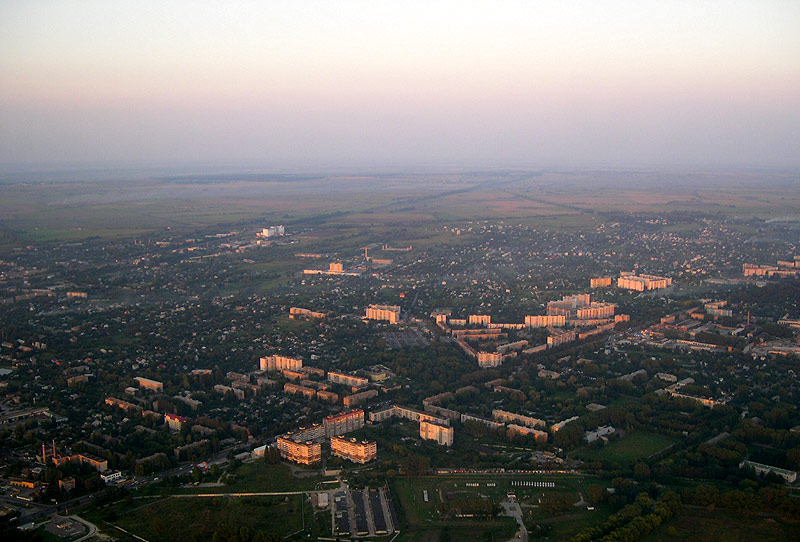
Aerial view of Boryspil.

== Subdivisions ==
=== Current ===
After the reform in July 2020, the raion consisted of 11 hromadas:

Hromada (Community)	Admin. center	Population (2020)	Transferred/Retained from
Boryspil urban	Boryspil	79,158	city of oblast significance of Boryspil
Divychky rural	Divychky	4,521	Pereiaslav-Khmelnyitskyi Raion
Hora rural	Hora	6,100	Boryspil Raion
Pereiaslav urban	Pereiaslav	31,947	city of oblast significance of Pereiaslav
Prystolychchia rural	Shchaslyve	10,856	Boryspil Raion
Studenyky rural	Studenyky	6,964	Pereiaslav-Khmelnyitskyi Raion
Tashan rural	Tashan	5,301	Pereiaslav-Khmelnyitskyi Raion
Tsybli rural	Tsybli	6,144	Pereiaslav-Khmelnyitskyi Raion
Voronkiv rural	Voronkiv	13,806	Boryspil Raion
Yahotyn urban	Yahotyn	31,154	Yahotyn Raion
Zolochivska rural	Hnidyn	5,851	Boryspil Raion

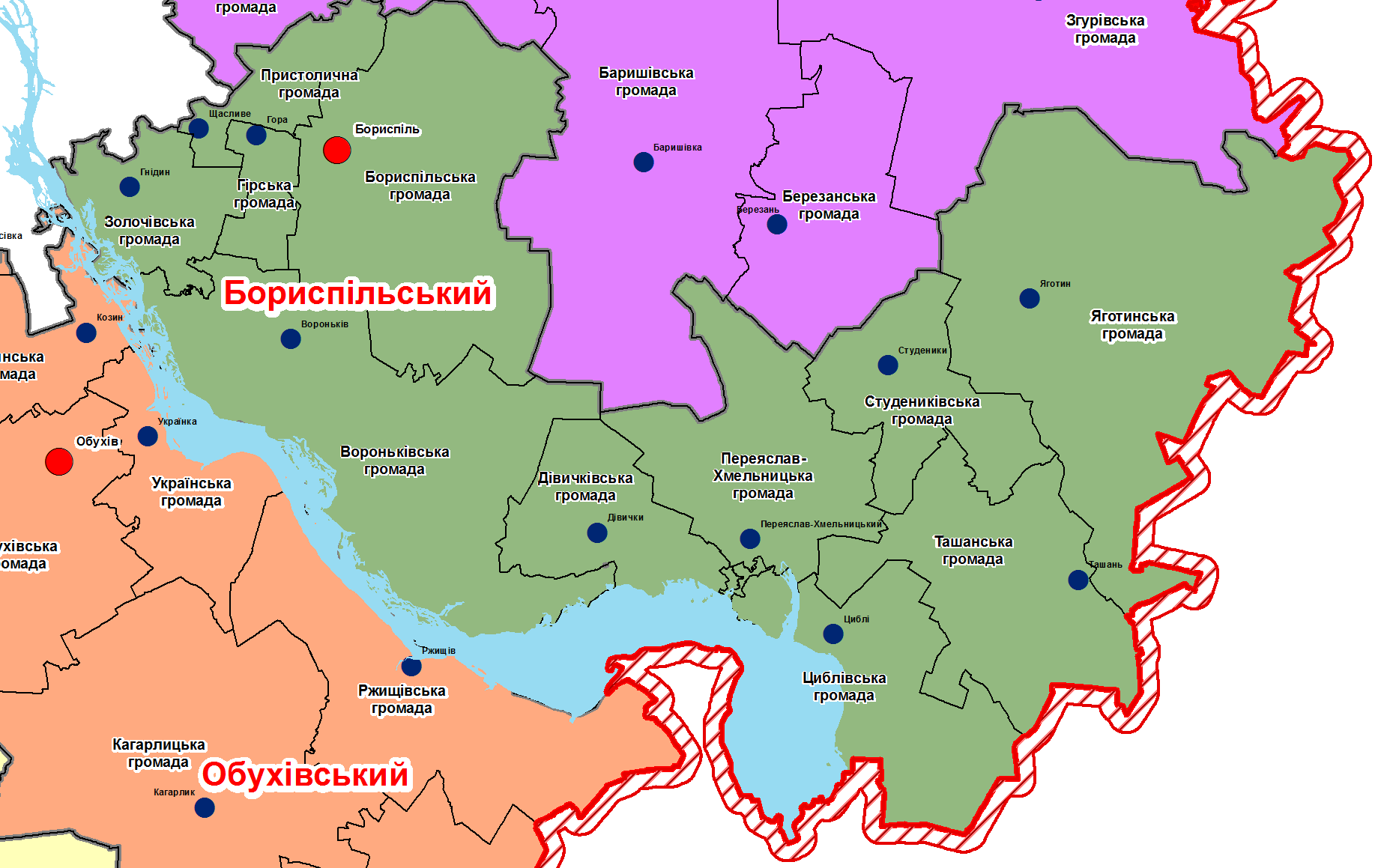
Boryspil Raion subdivision

=== Before 2020 ===
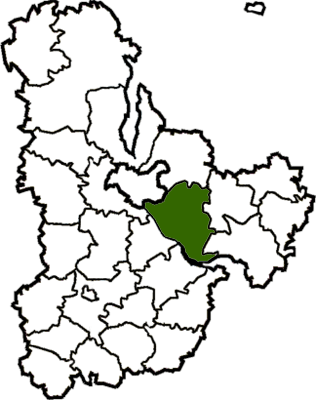
Boryspil Raion in Kyiv Oblast (1966-2020)

Before the 2020 reform, the raion consisted of four hromadas,

- Hora rural hromada with the administration in Hora;
- Prystolychchia rural hromada with the administration in Shchaslyve;
- Voronkiv rural hromada with the administration in Voronkiv;
- Zolochiv rural hromada with the administration in Hnidyn.

Previously, it consisted of 20 rural councils that contained 43 villages.

Largest councils in raion, 2001
#	Council	Population
1	Shchaslyve	5,078
2	Voronkiv	4,175
3	Velyka Oleksandrivka	3,732
4	Vyshenky	3,544
5	Kirove	3,496

No	Main village	Other villages
1	Hlyboke	Horodyshche
2	Hnidyn	
3	Holovuriv	Kyiliv
4	Hora	
5	Dudarkiv	Zaimyshche
6	Ivankiv	
7	Kirove	Artemivka; Lebedyn; Mala Starytsia; Sulymivka
8	Liubartsi	Tarasivka
9	Martusivka	
10	Myrne	Mali Yerkivtsi
11	Protsiv	
12	Revne	Leninivka
13	Rohoziv	Kyryivshchyna
14	Senkivka	Andriyivka; Velyka Starytsia; Horobiyivka; Hryhorivka; Perehudy
15	Shchaslyve	Prolisky
16	Soshnykiv	
17	Stare	Vasylky
18	Velyka Oleksandrivka	Bezuhlivka; Mala Oleksandrivka; Chubynske
19	Voronkiv	Zhovtneve
20	Vyshenky	Petrovske

== See also ==
- Administrative divisions of Kyiv Oblast
- Boryspil International Airport
