= KP Media =

Ukrainian publishing company

- Company type: Private
- Industry: Media
- Founded: 1 September 1995; 30 years ago
- Headquarters: Kyiv, Ukraine
- Products: Magazines & internet websites
- Website: http://www.kppublications.com/

KP Media was a Ukrainian publishing company, who published several magazines, including Korrespondent, Novynar, an English language newspaper, Kyiv Post, and owned several internet websites.

== History ==
KP Media was founded in September 1995 by American Jed Sunden, and its first publication was Kyiv Post, from which it takes its name.

KP Media sold Kyiv Post to Mohammad Zahoor, the husband of Ukrainian pop singer Kamaliya, on 28 July 2009.
