= List of newspapers in Ukraine =

Since November 2015, Ukrainian authorities, state agencies and local government authorities are forbidden to act as founders (or co-founders) of print media outlets.

According to a law that went into effect on 16 January 2022, all print media in Ukraine must be published in the state language, Ukrainian, even if it is published simultaneously in another language, such as Russian. This rule does not apply to material published exclusively in Crimean Tatar, in other languages of the indigenous peoples of Ukraine, or in any of the official languages of the European Union.

== Newspapers in Ukraine ==
Newspaper	Type	City	Circulation	Language(s)	Website
All About Accounting	National A4	Kyiv	93,100	Ukrainian, Russian	http://vobu.ua/
Capital	Internet (daily before 2014)	Kyiv		Ukrainian, Russian	https://capital.ua/
DELO	Internet (formerly Berlin format business daily)	Kyiv	15,000 (formerly)	Ukrainian, Russian	https://delo.ua/
Dilova Stolytsya	Internet (formerly broadsheet), business weekly	Kyiv	50,000	Ukrainian, Russian	https://www.dsnews.ua/
Den	Internet (broadsheet before 2022)	Kyiv	60,000 (formerly)	Ukrainian, Russian, English	https://day.kyiv.ua/
Euromaidan Press	Internet	Kyiv	N/A	English, Spanish	https://euromaidanpress.com
European Pravda	Internet		N/A	Ukrainian, Russian, English	https://www.eurointegration.com.ua/
Evening Kyiv	Regional	Kyiv		Ukrainian	https://vechirniy.kyiv.ua/
Expres	National	Lviv	508,200 (on Thursday); 1,223,700 (per week)	Ukrainian	https://expres.online/
Fakty ta Komentari	Internet (formerly tabloid)	Kyiv	1,100,000 (formerly)	Ukrainian, Russian	https://fakty.ua/
Gazeta.ua	Internet (biweekly before 2022)	Kyiv	400,370 pro week (formerly)	Ukrainian, Russian	https://gazeta.ua/
Hart (newspaper)	National	Chernihiv		Ukrainian	
Holos Ukrayiny	Daily	Kyiv	517,444 (1995)	Ukrainian	https://www.golos.com.ua/
Interfax-Ukraïna	News Agency	Kyiv	N/A	Ukrainian, Russian, English	https://interfax.com.ua/
Khreschatyk	Regional Broadsheet	Kyiv		Ukrainian	http://kreschatic.kiev.ua/
Komanda	Sports broadsheet (ceased publication in 2016)	Kyiv		Russian	https://komanda.com.ua/
KP	Internet (formerly broadsheet)	Kyiv	1,000,000 (formerly)	Ukrainian, Russian	https://kp.ua/
Krymska Svitlytsia	Regional weekly	Kyiv	1,000	Ukrainian	https://www.krymsvitlytsia.com.ua/
The Kyiv Independent	Internet	Kyiv	N/A	English	https://kyivindependent.com/
Kyiv Post	Internet (since 2021)	Kyiv	10,000 (formerly)	English	https://www.kyivpost.com/
Law & Business	National	Kyiv	16,000 per week	Ukrainian, Russian	https://www.zib.com.ua
Literaturna Ukraina	Weekly	Kyiv		Ukrainian	https://litukraina.com.ua/
Nezboryma Natsiya	Monthly	Kyiv		Ukrainian	https://nezboryma-naciya.org.ua/
Odessa Daily	Regional	Odesa		Russian	http://odessa-daily.com.ua/
The Odessa Journal	Internet	Odesa	N/A	English, Italian, French	https://odessa-journal.com/
Peremoha	Community	Krasnopillia	1,500	Ukrainian	
Poradnytsia	Weekly	Kyiv	1,747,000 (2000)	Ukrainian, Russian	http://www.poradnica.com.ua/
Post-Postup	Regional	Lviv	200,000	Ukrainian	https://expresgroup.com.ua/nashi-vydannya/post-postup
Profspilkovi Visti	Weekly	Kyiv	7,900	Ukrainian	http://www.psv.org.ua/
Sevodnya	Tabloid (ceased publication in 2019)	Kyiv	700,000 (formerly)	Russian	
Shliakh Peremohy	Bimonthly (every 2 weeks)	Kyiv	10,000+	Ukrainian	
Silski Visti	Broadsheet	Kyiv	57,900 (2020)	Ukrainian	http://www.silskivisti.kiev.ua/
Slovo Prosvity	Weekly	Kyiv		Ukrainian	http://slovoprosvity.org/
Ukraina Moloda	Daily	Kyiv	86,734 (2020)	Ukrainian	https://umoloda.kyiv.ua/
Ukrainianwall	Internet	Kyiv	30,000 (on Thursday); 220,000 (per week)	Ukrainian, Russian	https://ukrainianwall.com/
Ukrainska Pravda	Internet	Kyiv	N/A	Ukrainian, Russian, English	https://www.pravda.com.ua/
UNIAN	News Agency	Kyiv	N/A	Ukrainian, Russian	https://www.unian.ua/
Ukrainske Slovo	Weekly	Kyiv	40,000 (ceased publication)	Ukrainian	https://ukrslovo.org
Uryadovy Kuryer	Broadsheet	Kyiv	130,000–230,000	Ukrainian	https://ukurier.gov.ua/uk/
Vecherniye Vesti	Internet (formerly tabloid)	Kyiv	530,000 (formerly)	Ukrainian (formerly Russian)	https://gazetavv.com/
Vesti	National and regional broadsheet, A3 format	Kyiv	Ceased publication	Russian	http://vesti-ukr.com/
Video Novosti	National	Kyiv	7,000	Russian	https://web.archive.org/web/20190321172117/http://videonews.com.ua/
Vilne Zhyttia Plus	National	Ternopil		Ukrainian	https://vilne.org.ua/
Vysoky Zamok	National	Lviv	450,000	Ukrainian	https://www.wz.lviv.ua/
Dzerkalo Tyzhnia	Internet (formerly broadsheet)	Kyiv	Online newspaper	Ukrainian, Russian	https://dt.ua/
Zbruč	Internet	Lviv	Online newspaper	Ukrainian	https://zbruc.eu/
Zorile Bucovinei	Regional	Chernivtsi		Romanian	http://zorilebucovinei.com/
Ukrayina-Tsentr	Regional	Kropyvnytskyi	5,000	Ukrainian	https://uc.kr.ua/
Kommersant Ukraine	National B3+	Kyiv	Ceased publication	Russian	https://kommersant.ua/
LB.ua	Internet	Kyiv	Online newspaper	Ukrainian	https://lb.ua/

== Newspapers in the Ukrainian SSR ==
This is a list of newspapers published in the former Ukrainian Soviet Socialist Republic between 1919 and 1991.

=== Central newspapers ===
Newspaper	Type	City	Circulation	Language(s)
Visti (government gazette)	Central broadsheet	Kharkiv (1918–1934); Kyiv (1934–1941)	merged with Komunist in 1941, renamed Radianska Ukraina in 1943	Ukrainian
Radianska Ukraina	Central broadsheet	Kyiv		Ukrainian
Pravda Ukrainy	Central broadsheet	Kyiv		Russian
Silski Visti	Central broadsheet	Kyiv	1920–present	Ukrainian
Robitnycha Hazeta	Central broadsheet	Kyiv		Ukrainian
Molod Ukrainy	Central broadsheet	Kyiv		Ukrainian
Literaturna Ukraina	Central broadsheet	Kyiv		Ukrainian
Sportyvna Hazeta	Central broadsheet	Kyiv	1934–2008	Ukrainian

=== Regional newspapers (oblast level) ===
Newspaper	Type	City	Circulation	Language(s)
Vilna Ukraina	Regional broadsheet	Lviv		Ukrainian
Lvovskaya Pravda	Regional broadsheet	Lviv		Russian
Prykarpatska Pravda	Regional broadsheet	Ivano-Frankivsk		Ukrainian
Vecherniy Kharkov	Regional broadsheet	Kharkiv		Russian
Kirovogradskaya Pravda	Regional broadsheet	Kirovohrad		Russian
Kievskiy Vestnik	Regional broadsheet	Kyiv		Russian (some Ukrainian)
Priazovskiy Rabochiy	Regional broadsheet	Mariupol		Russian
Krymskaya Pravda	Regional broadsheet	Simferopol		Russian
Ilyichovets	Regional broadsheet	Mariupol		Russian
Odessaer Zeitung	Regional broadsheet	Odessa	1861–1918	German
Sotsyalisticheskiy Donbass	Regional broadsheet	Donetsk		Russian
Evening Kyiv	Regional broadsheet	Kyiv	1927-2018	Ukrainian
Vecherniaya Odessa	Regional broadsheet	Odessa		Russian
Vilne zhyttia	Regional broadsheet	Ternopil		Ukrainian

=== Others (local level) ===
Newspaper	Type	City	Circulation	Language(s)
Radianske selo	District broadsheet	Velykyi Bereznyi (Zakarpattia Oblast)		Ukrainian
Baryshivski Visti	District broadsheet	Baryshivka (Kyiv Oblast)		Ukrainian
Der Komunist	Unofficial	Kharkiv	1920–1922	Yiddish
Severodonetskiy Khimik	District broadsheet	Sievierodonetsk (Luhansk Oblast)		Russian
Sieverodonetski Visti	District broadsheet	Sievierodonetsk (Luhansk Oblast)		Russian, Ukrainian
Prapor Peremohy	District broadsheet	Chervonoarmiysk (Rivne Oblast)		Ukrainian
Nadrossia	District broadsheet	Korsun-Shevchenkivskyi (Cherkasy Oblast)		Ukrainian

== See also ==
- Human rights in Ukraine
- List of magazines in Ukraine
- List of newspapers
- List of newspapers in Ukrainian SSR
- Mass media in Ukraine
- Open access in Ukraine
- Ukraine
- Printed media in the Soviet Union
