= Vitaly Portnikov =

Ukrainian editor and journalist

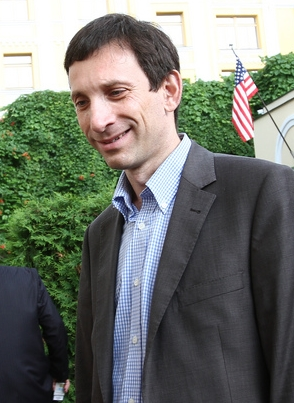
- Vitaly Portnikov in 2011
- Born: Vitaliy Eduardovych Portnykov; 14 May 1967 (age 59); Kyiv, Ukrainian SSR
- Education: MSU Faculty of Journalism
- Awards: Shevchenko National Prize
- Website: Vitaly Portnikov YouTube Channel

Vitaly Portnikov (Ukrainian: Віталій Едуардович Портников, romanized: Vitalii Eduardovych Portnykov; born 14 May 1967) is a Ukrainian editor and journalist.

A columnist for Radio Liberty and a regular author of analytical articles in Ukrainian publications on political and historical topics. Member of the PEN Ukraine, a laureate of the 2023 Shevchenko Prize for "journalistic articles and speeches of recent years".

== Biography ==
Portnikov was born in 1967 in Kyiv, Ukrainian SSR, Soviet Union (modern-day Ukraine) to Ukrainian Jewish parents. He graduated from the MSU Faculty of Journalism in 1990. During his studies, he cooperated with the Kyiv newspaper Molod Ukrayiny.

Since 1989, he works as the analyst of the Nezavisimaya Gazeta, specializing in post-Soviet countries, and cooperates with the Russian and Ukrainian services of Radio Free Europe/Radio Liberty.

As a free-lance journalist he has been publishing articles in Russian newspapers Russkiy Telegraf, Kommersant, Vedomosti, Vremya MN, Vremya Novostei, Moskovskiye Novosti, Obschaya gazeta, Ukrainian The Day, Korrespondent, Profil, Delovaya Nedelya, Dzerkalo Tyzhnia, Kontrakty, Novynar, Glavred, Latvian Biznes & Baltia, Telegraf, Estonian Estonia, Postimees, Polish Polityka, Gazeta Wyborcza, Polska, Belarusian BelGazeta. In 2007, he was the editor-in-chief of the Media-Dom holding & the Ukrainian newspaper Gazeta24. Since 2008, he has been the author of the weekly TV show "Kyivski pohliad". His areas of interest are also Jews and the Middle East. He is the columnist of the Israel's most-popular Russian-language newspaper Vesti and Moscow-based Evreiskie novosti.

In May 2010 Portnikov was appointed editor-in-chief of TVi. In November 2012 he became president of this channel.

In 2013 Portnikov was one of the organisers of the Euromaidan demonstrations. He started creating programs for Espreso TV in November 2013.

In late January 2014 he temporarily relocated to Warsaw, Poland, after receiving credible information from his contacts in Russia about a planned provocation against him, aimed at discrediting the Euromaidan movement. Prior to this, a video containing intimate and illegally obtained images of Portnikov was leaked online.

In July 2015 Portnikov became a member of the supervisory board Ukrainian National Council for TV and Radio Broadcasting as a representative of the political party People's Front.

== Awards ==
Vitaly Portnikov is the winner of the 1989 "Zolote Pero" (Golden Pen) award of the Ukrainian Association of Journalists. He has also been nominated for the title of the Journalist of the Year in Ukraine.

In 2022, Vitaliy Portnikov won the Vasyl Stus Prize.

In 2023, Vitaliy Portnikov won the Shevchenko National Prize.
