= Peremoha =

Peremoha may refer to the following:

- FC Peremoha Dnipro, football club in Dnipro, Ukraine
- Peremoha (Kharkiv Metro), 30th station of the Kharkiv Metro, Ukraine
- Peremoha, a newspaper published in Krasnopillia, Sumy Oblast
- Peremoha, Kharkiv Raion, a village in the Kharkiv region of Ukraine
- Peremoha Stadium, main stadium in Kamianske, Ukraine
- Peremoha, Dnipro, a microdistrict in Dnipro, Ukraine
