= Mari Cheba =

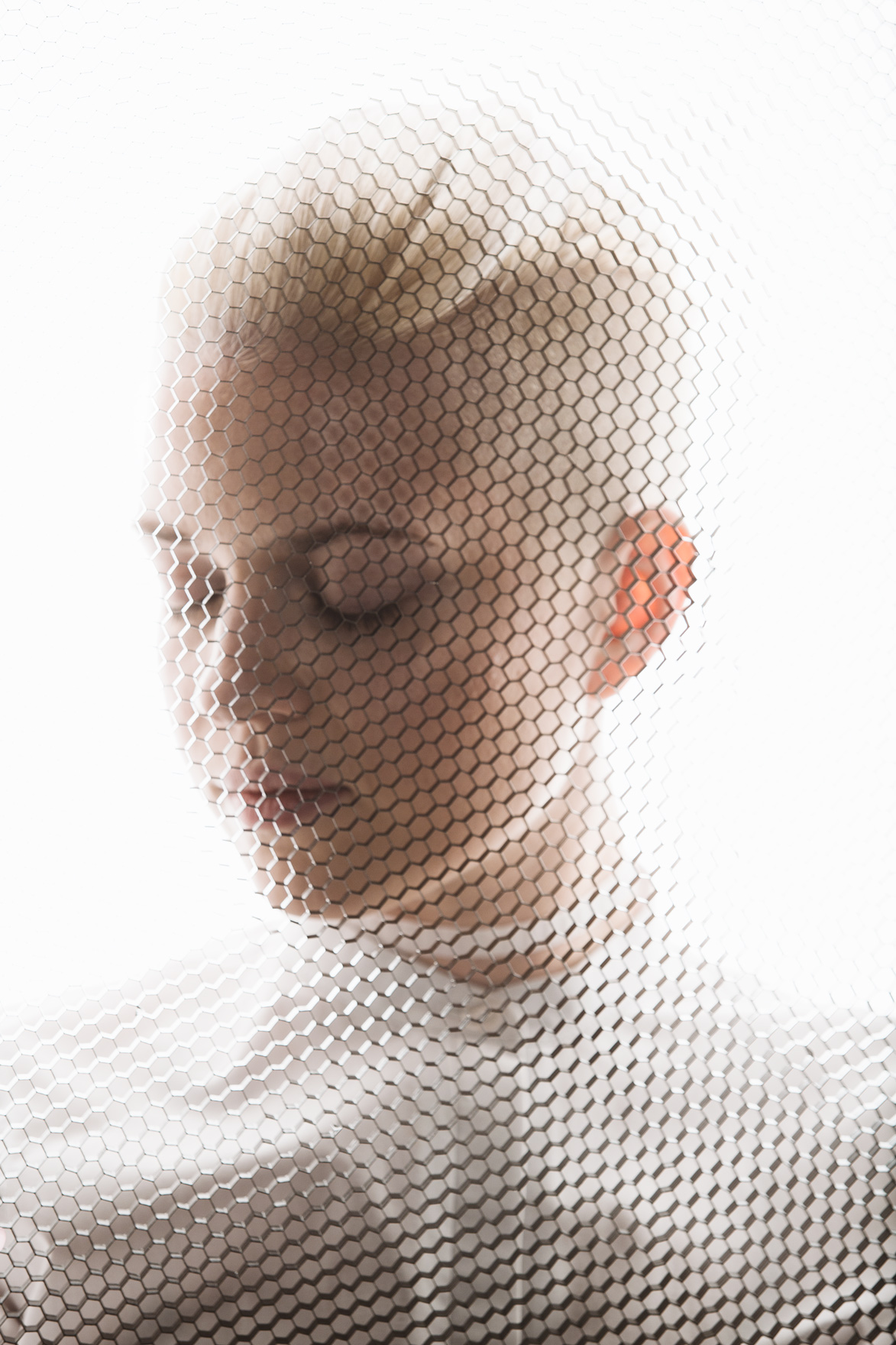
- Mari Cheba in 2016

Background information
- Also known as: Marija Cheba
- Born: Maria Chekhovska; Ukraine

Mari Cheba is a Ukrainian singer, songwriter, and volunteer. Her vocal abilities have been recognized by the global music industry: she won the title of «Best Female Vocal» according to Trip hop Nation among Ukrainian women. In 2016, Mari Cheba was nominated for the Yuna Award in the category «Breakthrough of the Year». Mari participated in the charitable tour in the ATO zone called «Support Your Own», which featured Ukrainian stars in 2014 (M. Burmaka, T. Matviyenko, A. Mirzoyan, Zlata Ognevich, A. Prykhodko, Ruslana, Yarmak, and others).

== Life ==
Maria was born in a suburb of Kyiv, but her parents took her to Kryvyi Rih in early childhood. In May 2010, Maria Chekhovska and guitarist Vitaly Telichko, who had known each other since Kryvyi Rih Music School No. 3, created an acoustic band. In 2012, the band released the album "Minimalism" on the Ultra Vague Recordings label, which had only two lines – vocals and guitar. This album was a kind of search for one's place, inherent in every person. A year later, they broke up.

After graduating from the University of Krivoy Rog, at the Faculty of Philology, she returned to Kyiv.

The singer under the pseudonym Marija Cheba worked with Yevhen Stupka from 2013 to 2014, a sound producer known for his work on Okean Elzy's album "Yananebibuv", Zemfira's single "Dosvydaniya", Diana Arbenina's album "Tsunami" and recorded several singles with him. Mari was a participant in the 2014 charity tour in the ATO zone "Support Your Own", in which Ukrainian stars took part. ( M. Burmaka T. Matvienko, A. Mirzoyan, Zlata Ognevich, A. Prykhodko, Ruslana, Yarmak and others) In April 2015, "Delphina Hvylyna" by iiiii eyes and #soundspace featuring vocals by Marija Chebawas included in the compilation of the best female trip-hop vocals "Special edition Trip Hop Nation Friends", which became the only Ukrainian-language track among the American, British and other participants in the collection. The compilation itself was mixed by trip-hop pioneer and founder of the band "Morcheeba" Paul Cheeba.

In 2015, Mari and guitarist Denis began searching for an electronic lineup for the singer's new project, Mari Cheba. Then keyboardist Valik Latysh joined their musical group. The musicians began to adopt an intuitive approach to their work, experimenting with sound without adhering to any standards or rules. The group combined a variety of styles with mixing vocal effects, creating a unique sound design and its own sound architecture.

On 19 June 2016, the band released their debut album "IONA". The track "Svitlo For Y" hits the Ukrainian radio and becomes popular among fans of the independent indie scene.

In 2017, Mari released her hit "With You", which became the artist's theme song. It became the most recognizable track from her work in Ukraine. Mari, together with photographer and director Koren Andriy, shot a video for this track; they showed the condition of Pidhirtsi Castle in Lviv region (village of Pidhirtsi), which had long been in need of restoration, but was very popular among Ukrainians who liked to film weddings there. The video also featured an exhibition of paintings that were used for weddings in the castle, but due to unfavorable conditions and high humidity in the premises were transported to a safer place on the territory of the Lviv National Gallery of Arts.

In 2018, Marie began collaborating with sound producer and musician Alex Che (Olexandr Cherepanov). They performed together and worked in the studio on an electronic album. They released the singles "I'm Listening" (2018), "Angels" (2019) and "Trust" (2020). In 2018, Marie shot a video for the track "I'm Listening" with director Koren Andriy, in which the artist Nadiya Meikher appears. In 2019, Andriy and Marie already performed as a creative duet and shot the video "Angels". The main roles in the video were played by the prima ballerina of the Ukrainian Opera Theater Kateryna Kukhar, with her husband, ballet dancer and producer Oleksandr Stoyanov, and the video was based on the staging of the modern Ukrainian ballet "Children of the Night".

In 2020, musician and sound producer Alex Che (Alexander Cherepanov) died of lung cancer. Marie retired from electronic music and abandoned work on a joint album with Alexander.

In 2020, together with musicians Mykhailo Vovk and Andriy "Mukha" Samoilo (the iconic guitarist of Boombox), Mari created a new sound format and returned to indie folk. Mari and the musicians create new musical material, emphasizing trigger vocals, expressive lyrical parts of acoustic guitars, and folk-rock sound. In 2021, Mari collaborated with sound producer and artist Misha Klimenko (ADAM) and creates the single "Lotus" together with the musicians. Andriy Koren shoots a nude clip with Mari for this track. This video work becomes a manifesto of the artist and director's natural beauty and self-perception without filters. In this work, Andriy and Mari show their ideal of female beauty: Квітка лотоса — це давній символ чистоти та просвітлення. Незважаючи на брудну воду, в якій цвіте лотос, він випромінює силу там, де немає ознак життя чи краси. Ця пісня — ода внутрішній силі, яка долає життєві труднощі та знаходить красу зсередини. (English translation: "As is known, the lotus is an ancient symbol of purity and enlightenment. Despite the dirty water in which this flower blooms, it radiates strength where there are no signs of life. This song is an ode to the inner strength that overcomes life's difficulties and finds beauty from within.")

In November 2021, Cheba acted as her own stylist for the music video "Pustoty", directed by Andriy Koren. This video was released in support of the release of the mini-album "KAMA", in which the guest sound producer is the legend of Ukrainian music Yuriy Khustochka (tracks "Love", "Music is Not for You") and the young sound producer with a soul sound Misha Klimenko, ADAM (tracks "Lotus", "Darling", "Pustoty").

On 26 February 2022, during the on-going Russian invasion of Ukraine, Mari released the song "Place of Power," which describes military aggression against peaceful Ukrainians.

== Awards and nominations ==
She won the "best female vocal" according to Trip Hop Nation.

In 2016, Mari Cheba was nominated for the Yuna Award in the category "Discovery of the Year".
