= The Odessa Journal =

Ukrainian digital newspaper

- Type: Digital newspaper
- Format: Online
- Founder: Ugo Poletti
- Editor: Ugo Poletti
- Founded: 2020; 6 years ago
- Language: English
- City: Odesa
- Country: Ukraine
- Website: odessa-journal.com

The Odessa Journal is a digital newspaper created in early 2020 by Italian entrepreneur Ugo Poletti to cover "culture, economy and historical amenities in Odessa" for an English speaking audience. The newspaper has evolved into the largest English language newspaper in Southern Ukraine. Following the Russian invasion of Ukraine the newspaper has shifted to covering the war in detail.

== History ==
The newspaper was founded in 2020 by Italian entrepreneur and journalist for the Kyiv Post, Ugo Poletti, as a tourist guide for English speaking visitors to Odesa and southern Ukraine in the wake of the COVID-19 pandemic. The newspaper covered cultural events, amenities and aspects of the local economy. The newspaper had planned on focusing on local art galleries at a meeting of the editor board the day before the Russian invasion of Ukraine. The mostly Ukrainian editorial staff shifted their focus to covering the war in depth. The paper seeks to counteract misinformation and "diffuse propaganda into facts" from either side of the conflict. The newspaper claims that 30% of their readership are in Ukraine, while the remaining 70% are from other countries, with a distinctly large readership from the Moldovan-Ukrainian population.

The newspaper and its owner and editor Poletti gave several interviews with Italian newspapers on the attack on Odesa and the specific responses from the Government of Italy as well as calling for a response from NATO and the United Nations.

== See also ==
- List of newspapers in Ukraine
