= Jed Sunden =

- Born: September 10, 1970 (age 56); Brooklyn, New York City, U.S.
- Occupations: Media entrepreneur Editorial writer Political organizer
- Known for: Founder of Kyiv Post; founder of KP Media; founder of American Ukraine PAC

Jed Sunden is an American media entrepreneur, editorial writer, and political organizer. He founded the Kyiv Post, Ukraine's English-language newspaper, and established KP Media, one of Ukraine's major media and internet companies.

Sunden launched several print and digital publications, including magazines, and completed the first media-related initial public offering (IPO) on the Ukrainian stock exchange. He has also contributed as a regular editorial writer and appeared as a commentator on Ukrainian television.

== Early life and education ==
Sunden is originally from Brooklyn, New York. He attended Macalester College in St. Paul, Minnesota, where he earned a bachelor's degree in history.

== Media career in Ukraine ==
=== Kyiv Post ===
In October 1995, Sunden founded the Kyiv Post, Ukraine's first independent English-language weekly newspaper, with only $8,000, three computers, and seven employees working from a small apartment in Kyiv. He was inspired by similar publications in post-Soviet states, such as the Prague Post. Under his ownership, the publication developed a reputation for investigative reporting and editorial independence in Ukraine's media landscape.

During the presidency of Leonid Kuchma, a period often associated by media observers with pressure on independent journalism in Ukraine, Sunden publicly supported the newspaper's editorial independence As both publisher and occasional editorial writer, he promoted libertarian views favoring free markets, free speech, and limited government interference.

=== KP Media ===
Sunden established KP Media in the mid‑1990s as a Ukrainian media company. The company's assets included the Kyiv Post and a portfolio of print and online media. KP Media published Korrespondent, a weekly news magazine founded in 2002 that produced annual rankings such as the Top‑100 list of influential Ukrainians. Korrespondent.net, launched as the magazine's sister online edition, operated as a bilingual news website covering national and international news.

The company also developed internet properties including Bigmir)net, an informational and entertainment portal that combined news, services, and content across multiple categories and was among the prominent Ukrainian web platforms associated with KP Media in the 2000s and early 2010s.

Under Sunden's ownership, KP Media launched or operated several magazine titles and digital projects in both Ukrainian and Russian. These included special print projects and annual editorial lists such as Korrespondent Top 100, designed to profile figures in Ukrainian public life.

In the early 2010s, KP Media's media assets were sold to United Media Holding (UMH), then associated with Petro Poroshenko.

Media outlets associated with KP Media were also involved in legal disputes related to defamation and press freedom. In one such case, the owner of Korrespondent announced plans to appeal a defamation verdict, describing the ruling as part of broader legal pressure on independent media in Ukraine.

== Political controversies ==
=== Persona non grata designation ===
In March 2000, during a period of increased pressure on independent media under President Leonid Kuchma's administration, Sunden was declared persona non grata by Ukrainian authorities and temporarily barred from entering the country. The ban occurred shortly before a planned visit by U.S. Secretary of State Madeleine Albright and was widely interpreted by press freedom observers as part of broader attempts by state security services to constrain critical journalism. The decision was reportedly signed by the head of the Security Service of Ukraine (SBU) at the time, Leonid Derkach, and whom multiple sources have described as a figure within the so-called Dnipropetrovsk clan.

Sunden discovered the ban when he returned from a trip to Turkey and was stopped at Boryspil airport. He was initially refused entry on April 11 but was able to return to Ukraine after diplomatic engagement by U.S. officials a few days later. Some press freedom monitors and analysts have described the incident as indicative of the broader climate of administrative pressure on independent media in Ukraine during this period. There were also reports of continued bureaucratic and administrative harassment of Sunden's business in the following years.

The incident took place in the early days of Vladimir Putin's presidency in Russia (he assumed office on January 1, 2000) and has been noted by some analysts as the first instance of direct political pressure by Russia on Ukrainian sovereignty in that period. A similar persona non grata declaration against a German citizen reportedly occurred in June 2000, shortly before a visit by German Chancellor Gerhard Schröder.

=== Kuchma tapes scandal ===
Sunden's name appeared in the controversial "Kuchma tapes" - secret recordings made in the office of Ukrainian President Leonid Kuchma between 1999 and 2001. These recordings, which became public in the early 2000s, were widely reported by the media as containing discussions that raised allegations of corruption and abuse of power involving senior Ukrainian officials and business figures. Some excerpts of the recordings were interpreted by critics as including discussions about how government officials should respond to critical media coverage and apply administrative pressure on independent outlets.

Independent press freedom monitors documented instances of official harassment and intimidation of journalists and media outlets during this period; in one reported case related to the Kyiv Post, Sunden was stopped and denied entry to Ukraine in 2000, an action interpreted as part of broader pressure on critical journalists. There were also reports of continued bureaucratic and administrative challenges faced by Sunden's business in subsequent years.

== Community involvement ==
Sunden served in leadership roles within the Jewish community in Ukraine, including as vice president under Rabbi Yaakov Dov Bleich, the Chief Rabbi of Kyiv and Ukraine, He has been active in political reform and anti-corruption efforts in Ukraine. Sunden has also publicly addressed issues of antisemitism, including cases involving Jewish community institutions and allegations of antisemitic campaigns within Ukrainian academic institutions

Sunden was a founding donor to anti‑corruption initiatives in Ukraine, including supporting civil society efforts associated with the Anti‑Corruption Action Center (AntAC) and other reform organizations, and was involved with groups promoting press freedom and anti‑corruption reforms.

== American Ukraine PAC ==
In early 2024, Sunden founded the American Ukraine PAC, a bipartisan political action committee dedicated to supporting Ukraine's interests in the United States Congress. The PAC focuses on fundraising for lawmakers from both parties who support Ukraine's sovereignty and security. One of the organization's key goals is to support members of the Congressional Ukrainian Caucus, a bipartisan coalition of over 90 lawmakers. The PAC has organized multiple fundraisers for congressional candidates and released a Congressional Scorecard to measure lawmakers' support for Ukraine.

== Personal life ==
In 2013, Sunden and his wife Olga, a songwriter and activist, purchased a townhouse on the Upper West Side of Manhattan for approximately $8 million.
