= UGP =

UGP may refer to:

- Ukrainian Galician Party, a Ukrainian political party in Galicia
- United Goans Party, former political party in Goa, Daman and Diu, a territory of India
- United General Party, former name of the United Peoples Party (Fiji)
- Ukrainian Gothic Portal
