= Korrespondent.net =

Ukrainian online newspaper

- Website type: News
- Available in: Ukrainian/Russian
- Editor: Yuliya McGuffie
- Website: korrespondent.net
- Commercial: Yes
- Registration: Not required
- Launched: 2000; 26 years ago

The Korrespondent.net (Ukrainian: Кореспондент.net; Russian: Корреспондент.net; literally: Correspondent) is an online newspaper in Ukraine launched in 2000. It is a sister project to the Korrespondent printed weekly magazine also containing the latter's reduced free online version. Korrespondent.net is a bilingual Ukrainian and Russian project, while the magazine is Russian-only. It is part of United Media Holding group, created by Boris Lozhkin and owned by Ukrainian oligarch Serhiy Kurchenko.

== See also ==
- Ukrayinska Pravda
- Kyiv Post
- Ukraine Online
