= Silski Visti =

Ukrainian newspaper

Silski Visti (Ukrainian: Сільські вісті, lit. 'Rural News') is a Kyiv-based daily newspaper published in Ukrainian.

== History and profile ==
Founded in 1920, Silski Visti is read amongst the rural population, with a circulation of 500,000. It was quite critical of the former President Leonid Kuchma. The paper was among the supporters of the Our Ukraine party in 2004.

Ivan Spodarenko served as the editor of Silski Visti. In January 2004 Kyiv's Shevchenkivsky district court temporarily suspended the publication of the paper due to the lawsuit filed by the Jewish Antifascist Committee. It occurred as a result of the publication of an article which alleged that nearly 400,000 Jews joined in Nazi SS forces during the invasion of Ukraine by Nazi Germany during World War II.

In 2006 the editor of the paper, Ivan Spodarenko, was awarded the Hero of Ukraine medal.

== See also ==
- List of newspapers in Ukraine
