= Vysoky Zamok (newspaper) =

Ukrainian newspaper

- Format: Newspaper and website
- Founded: 1991
- Language: Ukrainian
- Website: wz.lviv.ua

Vysoky Zamok (Ukrainian: Високий Замок, lit. 'High Castle') or VZ is a leading Ukrainian daily socio-political newspaper published in Lviv, in the western part of the country. It is published three times a week in Tuesday, Thursday and Saturday, with a combined weekly circulation of 565,000. Distributed in cities: Lviv, Uzhgorod, Chernivtsi, Ivano-Frankivsk, Ternopil, Khmelnitsky, Rivne, Lutsk, Vinnytsia, Kyiv.

The newspaper began its existence as a Russian-speaking "Lvovskaya Pravda", which was published in Lviv since 1946. Since September 7, 1991 changed the name to "Vysoky Zamok". Since March 1992, the newspaper prints in its modern name "Vysoky Zamok" bilingual (Russian and Ukrainian), and from January 2015 only in Ukrainian.

A valuable intangible asset of the organization is the logo, which depicts the silhouette of Lviv. It is repeated on the kiosks of the press and used by many firms are not related to the newspaper. Logo was developed in the early 90's by the artist Victoria Kovalchuk.

By April 2011, most of the issues of the newspaper came out in the "serious" A2 format, but under the influence of modern trends, the editorial board decided to go fully to the format A3, besides, since then, the newspaper became full-color.

== History ==
According to Soviet occupation, this newspaper was called "Lvovskaya Pravda", came from 1946 five times a week and was an organ of oblast and city committees of the Communist Party of Ukraine, as well as local councils. At the peak of Khrushchev thaw "Lvovskaya Pravda" for a couple of years made a bilingual, but later the Ukrainian version was removed.

With the independence, "Lvovskaya Pravda" turned into a "Vysoky Zamok" and the first six months came to Russian (August 1991 - March 1992), after which it continued to go bilingual, Ukrainian and Russian. When Ukraine gained independence, the head of the Lviv Regional Council Vyacheslav Chornovil decided that the newspaper should be reformed. The idea was to issue a "Vysoky Zamok" in Russian to preserve the readers of Lvovskaya Pravda, but to make a newspaper in Ukrainian in spirit. Mr. Chornovil proposed to be the editor-in-chief of Stepan Kurpil, but he replied that the newspaper in Russian, even with such noble motifs, will never be popular and influential in Lviv, and proposed to make a Ukrainian-speaking version. The Ukrainian version of the new newspaper of the regional council began to increase, Russian - decline, and over time the ratio stabilized: about 85-90% of readers were chosen Ukrainian, 10-15% - Russian.

Over time, the Russian version remained only in the weekly (the translation in Russian in the fourth issue of VZ). - Duplain a daily newspaper for 15% of readers unprofitable. In the 1990s and 2010s, a Vysoky Zamok was the only Russian-speaking newspaper that came out in Lviv and freely sold on layouts.

Chief Editor from 1991 to 2006 was Stepan Kurpil, which as of 2016 was led by a publishing house "Vysoky Zamok".

In 2015, in connection with the economic crisis, the Russian-speaking weekly issue has been terminated.

== Subscription indices ==
All indexes are all-Ukrainian, that is, a subscription is taken in any branch of Ukrposhta throughout the country.

30136 - full set (3 times per week)

23129 - Issues for Tuesday, Thursday and Friday

30640 - Only Thursday release (Weekly)

== Tabs ==
The VZ has two regional tabs:

1) "VZ" + Drohobych

2) "VZ" + Sambirshchyna, as well as the Zamkove with schedule on TB.

== Owners ==
In certain periods of its existence, the owners of a significant part of the shares were Lviv Regional Council and Norwegian Firm "Orkla Media A. S.". But starting with the 2000 main shareholders PJSC "Publishing House High Castle" is:

- 68.5% - an individual (owner name is closed information)
- 30% Individual (owners' name is closed information)
- 1.5% Individual (owners' name is closed information)

== See also ==
- List of newspapers in Ukraine
