= Vecherniye Vesti =

Tabloid newspaper published in Kyiv, Ukraine

Vecherniye Vesti (Russian: Вечерние вести, lit. 'The Evening News'), founded in 1999, is a Russian language Kyiv-based Ukrainian tabloid newspaper with a circulation of 530,000. It was fiercely critical of then-President Leonid Kuchma and his administration. The paper is controlled by the former Prime Minister Yulia Tymoshenko, a prominent critic of Kuchma.

== See also ==
- List of newspapers in Ukraine
