= Lviv Today =

- Issue 86, January 2016
- Categories: Local events, News, Culture, Entertainment
- Frequency: Monthly
- Circulation: 5,000
- Publisher: Peter Dickinson
- First issue: 1 May 2008; 18 years ago
- Country: Ukraine
- Based in: Lviv
- Language: English
- Website: www.lvivtoday.com.ua

Lviv Today is a Ukrainian English-language magazine published in Lviv, Ukraine.

== History and profile ==
Lviv Today was founded in May 2008. The magazine is owned and issued by English journalist Peter Dickinson who moved to Ukraine roughly ten years ago.

The magazine focuses on foreign businessmen, politicians, tourists, as well as on local residents. Its content includes information about business, advertisement and entertainment spheres in Lviv, and the country in general.

As of 2011 Andrew Lewis was appointed editor-in-chief of the magazine.

== See also ==
List of magazines in Ukraine
