= DELO =

Delo.UA
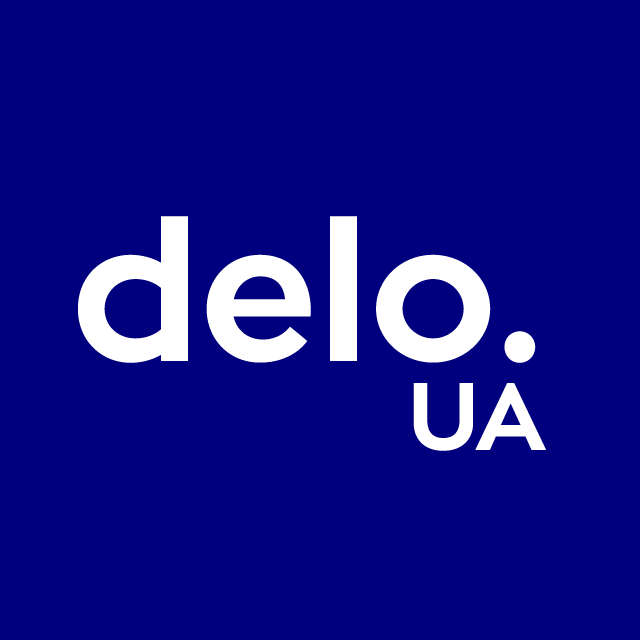
- Website type: business news
- Area served: Ukraine
- Key people: Kostiantyn Parshyn
- Website: delo.ua
- Registration: 2005

Delo (Ukrainian: Дело) is a business oriented online media in Ukraine, belonging to ekonomika+ media holding.

Delo was the first daily in Ukraine, publishing its real print circulation (13.000 - 15.000) and trying to introduce Western editorial and business standards into the rather post-soviet environment.

== History ==
Delo belonged to ekonomika+, a joint-venture of Handelsblatt Publishing Group, Germany, one Czech and two young Ukrainian publishers. The newspaper started in October 2005 as the first independent business daily of Ukraine. Its competitors are the Russian newspaper Kommersant and Ekonomicheskie Izvestia, which belongs to ISD - Industrial Union of Donbas. Since 2012, the newspaper is not being published anymore, and the media switched to a web-site Delo.ua

Since early 2019, the owner of Ekonomika+ media holding which owns Delo become Kostiantyn Parshyn.

== See also ==
- List of newspapers in Ukraine
