= Komu Vnyz =

Ukrainian rock band

Komu Vnyz Кому Вниз
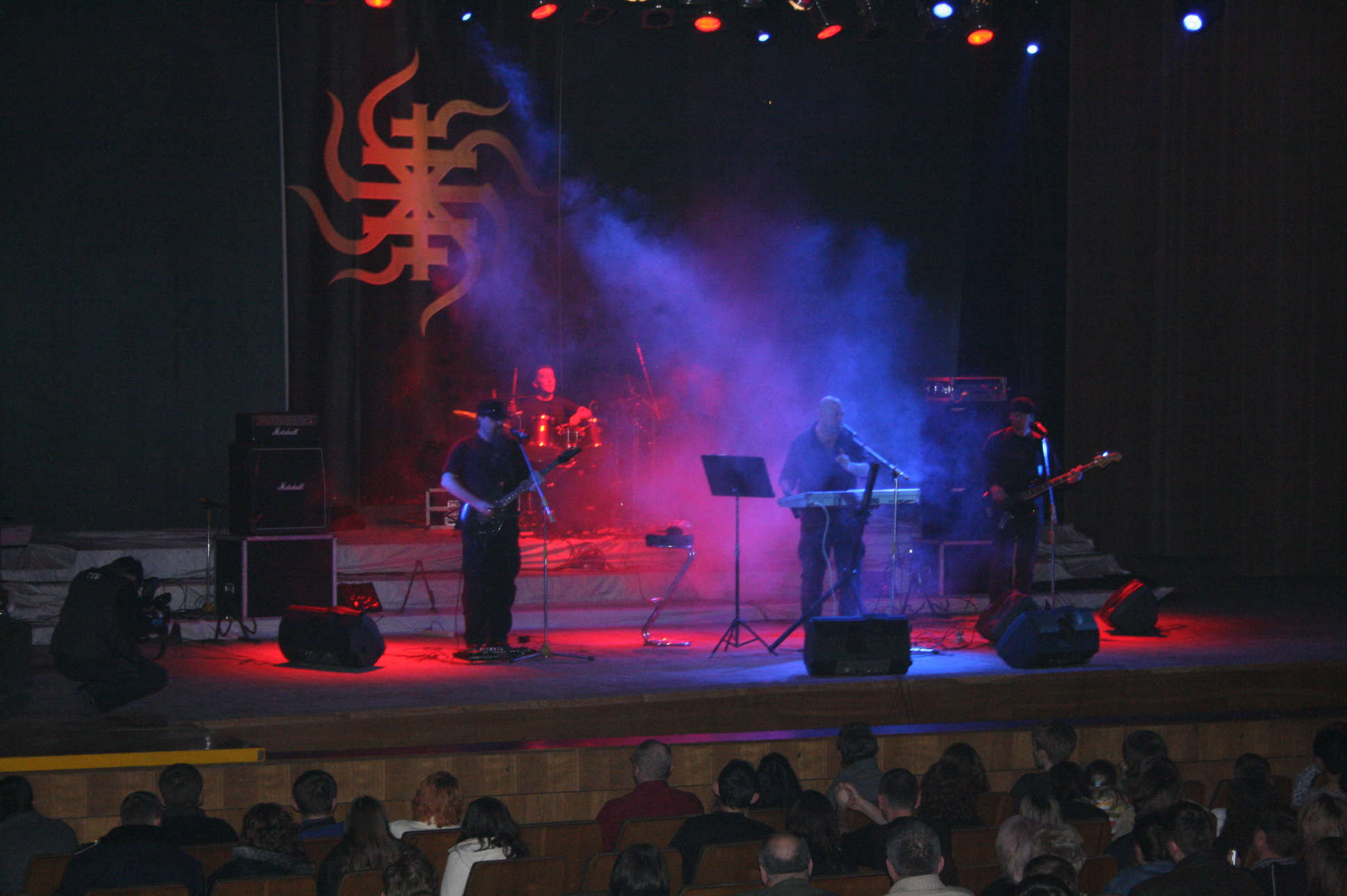
- Komu Vnyz performing in 2007

Background information
- Origin: Kyiv, Ukraine
- Genres: Gothic rock
- Years active: 1988–present
- Label: Ukrainian Gothic Portal
- Members: Andriy Sereda; Volodyslav Maliuhin; Yevhen Razin; Oleksandr Sereda
- Past members: Volodyslav Makarov; Serhiy Stepanenko
- Website: http://www.komuvnyz.com

Komu Vnyz (Ukrainian: Кому Вниз [koˈmu ˈu̯nɪz]) is a Ukrainian rock band founded in 1988. Komu Vnyz's music is a blend of gothic and industrial styles, combined with the lyrics of ancient Ukrainian legends.

The band name is a perestroika-era derogatory pun on the word "Communism". It is literally translated as "Who needs to go down".

== History ==
Komu Vnyz got its start in the year 1988. Unknown young actor Andriy Sereda and educator Volodyslav Makarov worked together in the same theater. Sereda and Makarov joined with three more artists (Serhiy Stepanenko, Yevhen Razin, Volodyslav Maliuhin) to make Komu Vnyz. They wound up at their first festival Chervona Ruta completely by chance. It was too late to submit the sample recording to the panel of judges for the tryout, but Taras Petrynenko, after listening to their work, insisted that they participated in the event. They received second place.

After releasing their first self-titled album, Komu Vnyz and the rest of the Chervona Ruta winners toured in Canada, Poland, and many Ukrainian cities.

From 1996 onward, Komu Vnyz came out from the precipice of financial difficulties. Playbills started to appear on railings and fences in Kyiv for their 1997 concert, in Kastus, named for one of their albums.

In 2000 the band played at Ivan Franko theater, performing a concert dedicated to the memory of 300 young students killed during the Battle of Kruty. They also headlined at the first Ukrainian gothic festival, "Dity Nochi" ("Children of the Night"), organized by Ukrainian Gothic Portal, and started to work with UGP. In 2002 the band played at the European gothic festival, Wave Gotik Treffen.

In 2003, Makarov left the band. He died in January 2016. As of 2019, the band still continues their activity. Premier Minister of Ukraine, Oleksiy Honcharuk, has even visited "Veterans Strong Party" war-veteran charity concert where the band performed along with others.

Serhiy Stepanenko died on 18 November 2022, at the age of 58. In 2023, he was replaced by Sereda's son Oleksandr, the first new member of the band since its formation.

In 2023, the band's 1996 album In Kastus was reissued on vinyl, with new cover art and including the three cassette-exclusive tracks from the original 1996 release. The group's 1990 self-titled album followed on digital services shortly after, with a vinyl release following in 2025.

== Discography ==
=== Albums ===
- 1990 - Komu vnyz (Кому вниз)
- 1996 - In kastus
- 1998 - Padaya vverkh (Падая вверх) - demo recordings from the band's Russophone era, c. 1988-89

=== EPs ===
- 2007 - Ab ovo usque ad mala
- 2014 - 4
- 2016 - IDEM 2345

=== Live albums ===
- 1999 - In kastus in vivo
- 2018 - Live at FEST!republic Lviv
- 2018 - Live at the Lviv Opera House

=== Compilations ===
- 2003 - "Komu Vnyz. Rock legends of Ukraine" ("Best of" collection)
- 2006 - "Komu Vnyz. MP3 collection"
- 2009 - "Komu Vnyz. Reformatsiya: 25 punktiv" ("Best of" collection)
- 2011 - "Ya Vernuvsia Domiv" (Tribute to Braty Hadiukiny)
