= Meet the Russians =

- Country of origin: United Kingdom
- Original language: English

Original release
- Network: Fox
- Release: 25 September – 30 November 2013

Meet the Russians is a 2013 British reality show produced by Fox about wealthy Russians and Ukrainians who live in London, England. It premiered on 25 September 2013. It was directed by Emma Walsh. According to The New York Times, the show focuses on "newly-arrived, ambitious Russians who had yet to fully assimilate into British society."

== Cast ==
- Mohammad Zahoor as himself
- Kamaliya Zahoor as herself
- Natalia Kapchuk as herself
- Marinika Smirnova as herself
- Katia Elizarova as herself
- Pavel Pogrebnyak as himself
- Maria Pogrebnyak-Shatalova as herself
- Natalia Kaut as herself
- Veronica Voronina as herself
- Julia Zaporozhenko as herself
- Arina Pritch as herself
- Serg Ivo as himself
- Liz Brewer as herself
