= Dzvin =

Ukrainian literary magazine

Dzvin; Дзвін
- Editor: Yurii Koval
- Categories: Literature, Art
- First issue: 1940
- Company: National Writers' Union of Ukraine
- Country: Ukraine
- Based in: 6 Kniazia Romana, Lviv
- Language: Ukrainian

Dzvin (Ukrainian: Дзвін) is a Ukrainian literary, art, social and political journal of the National Writers' Union of Ukraine.

== Information ==
Published in Lviv from 1940 as "Literatura i mystetstvo" (Ukrainian: Література і мистецтво). From 1951 to 1991 it was published as "Zhovten" (Ukrainian: Жовтень), and from 1991 as "Dzvin".

Editor – Yurii Koval (from 2014).

== See also ==
- List of magazines in Ukraine

== Sources ==
- Адамович Б. "Дзвін" // Encyclopedia of History of Ukraine. — Т. 2. — К., 2005. — S. 376.
