= Gazeta.ua =

Illustrated newspaper

Newspaper in Ukrainian
- Chief editor: Volodymyr Ruban
- Categories: Newsmagazine
- Frequency: Thursday and Friday
- First issue: 1 September 2005; 20 years ago
- Company: New Information Publishing Group Ltd.
- Country: Ukraine
- Language: Ukrainian (≈90%), Russian (≈10%)
- Website: Official website

Gazeta.ua (Ukrainian: Газета по-українськи 'Newspaper in Ukrainian') is an illustrated newspaper based in Kyiv covering politics, economics, culture, sports, arts, and other different topics aimed at Ukrainian-language readers. It is chiefly published in Ukrainian, but quotes in Russian are not translated. The newspaper has its website, Gazeta.ua, where archives and additional information not included in the print newspaper may be found. It also has editorial offices in Lviv, Vinnytsia, Poltava, and Cherkasy. The owner of the newspaper is New Information Publishing Group, which also owns the magazine Krayina (The Country).

== See also ==
- List of newspapers in Ukraine
