= Fakty ta Komentari =

Ukrainian weekly newspaper

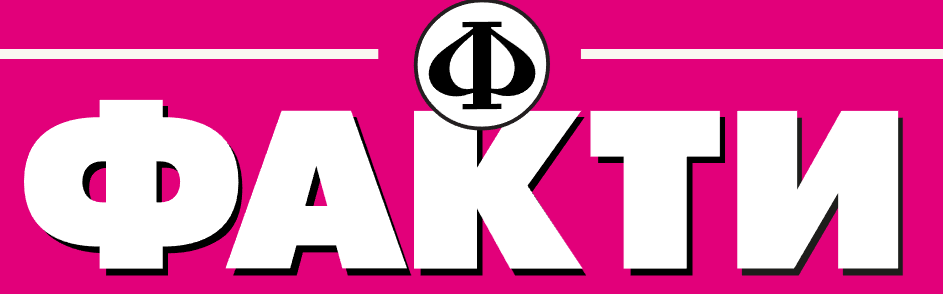

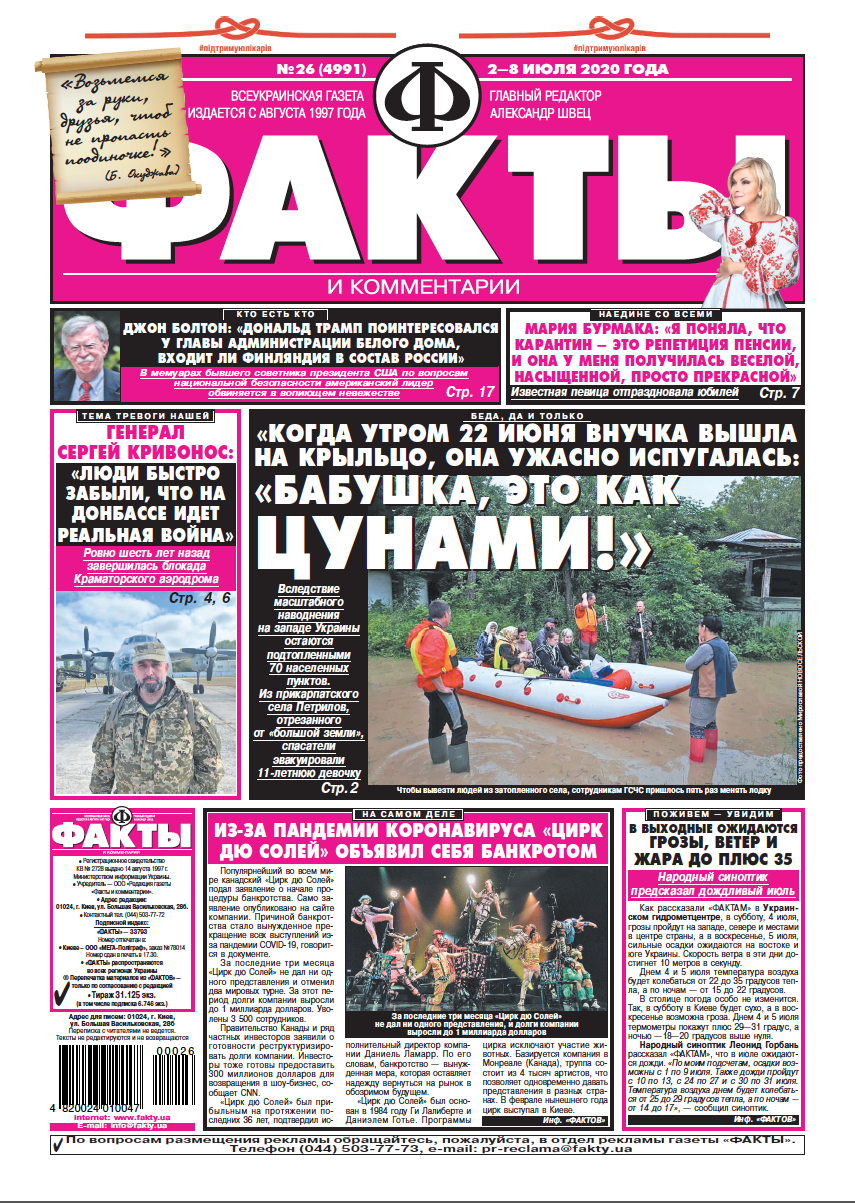
- Cover of Fakty ta Komentari (July, 2020)
- Type: Weekly newspaper
- Editor-in-chief: Oleksandr Shvets
- Founded: August 24, 1997; 28 years ago
- Language: Ukrainian
- Headquarters: V. Vasylkivska str., 28-b, Kyiv, Ukraine
- Country: Ukraine
- Circulation: near 180 000
- Website: fakty.ua

Fakty ta Komentari (Ukrainian: Факти та коментарі, lit. 'Facts and Comments') is a Ukrainian weekly newspaper published since August 1997.

Fakty was published five times a week except Sundays and Mondays till January 2018. In 2018 it has turned to weekly.

Oleksandr Shvets is editor-in-chief and the owner. The edition was a property of EastOne Group till June 2016.

== History ==
The newspaper began coming out in August 1997.

The long detailed headline for each article is the paper's style feature.

According to TNS Fakty ta Komentari were second among weeklies since 2006 till 2009. In 2010 the edition become a leader of the “Common Interest Editions” segment. At that time the readership of its one issue was more than 1.300.000 persons.

In 2009, the newspaper had to close its distribution net because of the 2008 financial crisis.

In spring of 2015 the editorial office had to cut the third part of its staff because of the economic crisis that has been provoked by the armed conflict in the Eastern Ukraine.

In June 2016 EastOne Group has sold Fakty ta Komentari to general director and editor-in-chief Oleksandr Shvets.

Since January 2018 Fakty ta Komentari has been coming out in the form of weekly.

Meanwhile, its web-portal fakty.ua started to cover news in Ukraine and all over the world on a 24-hour basis.

== See also ==
- List of newspapers in Ukraine
