= Novynar =

Weekly news magazine in Ukraine (2007–2008)

- Categories: News magazine
- Frequency: Weekly
- Publisher: Jed Sunden
- First issue: August 2007
- Final issue: 2008
- Company: KP Media
- Country: Ukraine
- Based in: Kyiv
- Language: Ukrainian
- OCLC: 176064896

Novynar (Ukrainian: Новинар, lit. ''Newsmaker'') was a weekly news magazine briefly published in Kyiv, Ukraine, from 2007 to 2008.

== History and profile ==
Novynar was first published in August 2007. Its website was also launched on the same date. It was established as a quality alternative to Russian language news magazines in the country.

The magazine was part of the KP Media which also owned Kyiv Post and 15 Minutes, a metro daily. The publisher was an American businessman, Jed Sunden. It was published weekly in Kyiv.

The KP media reported the initial circulation of Novynar as 15,000 copies in August 2007.

Novynar ceased publication in November 2008 due to financial problems faced. Sunden also closed 15 Minutes the same year and sold Kyiv Post to a British businessman, Mohammad Zahoor, in July 2009.

== See also ==
- List of magazines in Ukraine
