= List of magazines in Ukraine =

This is a list of magazines in Ukraine.

According to law, that went into force on 16 January 2022, all print media in Ukraine must be published in the state language, Ukrainian. This rule does not apply to material published exclusively in Crimean Tatar, in other languages of the indigenous peoples of Ukraine or in official languages of the European Union.

Magazine	Frequency	City	Circulation	Language(s)	Years published
Aeroplan	Once in two months		24,000	Ukrainian, English	
Art Ukraine	quarterly			Ukrainian, Russian, English	2007-2013
Barvinok	monthly	Kharkiv (as Zhovtenya), Kyiv	1,2-1,8 million (1950s-1990s)	Ukrainian	1928-2019
Der Spiegel-Profil	Weekly	Kyiv	27,600	Russian	2007-2008
Dnipro	Monthly	Kyiv	5,500	Ukrainian	since 1927
Dzvin	Monthly	Lviv		Ukrainian	since 1940
Fokus	Weekly	Kyiv		Russian (until 2022), Ukrainian (from 2022)	since 2006
Futbol (magazine)	every 2 weeks	Kyiv		Russian (until 2022), Ukrainian (2022)	1996-2022
Gameplay		Kyiv	25,000	Russian	2005-2010
Glavred		Kyiv		Ukrainian, Russian (online version)	2002-2010
Hroshi	2 times a month	Kyiv		Russian (as Dengi), Ukrainian (since 2016)	2006-2022
Kino-Teatr	bimonthly (once every 2 months)	Kyiv		Ukrainian	since 1995
Kontrakty	weekly	Lviv (before 2000 as Halytski Kontrakty), Kyiv (after 2000)	68,000	Ukrainian, Ukrainian and Russian versions (after 2000)	1990-2014
Korrespondent	weekly (until 2022), online magazine (since 2022)	Kyiv	50,000 (formerly)	Russian, Ukrainian (online version)	since 2002
Krayina	Weekly	Kyiv	21,800	Ukrainian	since 2009
Krytyka	Monthly	Kyiv		Ukrainian	since 1997
Lel (magazine)	monthly		10,000-200,000	Ukrainian	1992-2003
Local History	Monthly	Lviv		Ukrainian	since 2018
Lviv Today	Monthly	Lviv	5,000	English	since 2008
Muzyka (magazine)	bimonthly (6 times a year)	Kyiv		Ukrainian	since 1923
National Geographic Ukraine	monthly			Ukrainian	2013-2015
Novynar	Weekly	Kyiv		Ukrainian	2007-2008
Obrazotvorche Mystetstvo	bimonthly (every 2 months)	Kyiv		Ukrainian	since 1935
Pamiatky Ukrainy	monthly	Kyiv	100,000 (late 1980s - early 1990s)	Ukrainian	since 1989
Perets'	online magazine (since 2020)	Kyiv		Ukrainian	1922-1933, since 1941
Polityka i Kultura	weekly			Ukrainian	1999-2004
RBG-Azimuth				Russian, Ukrainian (since 2014)	since 2006
Ukrainian Gothic Portal	Weekly		6,000	Ukrainian, Russian, English	since 1999
The Ukrainian Week	Weekly (until 2022), online magazine (since 2022)	Kyiv	31,100, 23,000 (2012)	Ukrainian, English	since 2007
Ukrainian Culture (magazine)	bimonthly (every 2 months)	Kyiv	1100	Ukrainian, English (special issue)	1909-1914 (Ukrainska Khata), 1917-1919 (Shliakh), 1921-1937 (Shliakh do Komunizmu), 1937-1941 (Sotsialistychna Kultura), since 1947 (under current name)
Ukrainskyi Teatr		Kyiv	700	Ukrainian	1917-2018, since 2024
Vogue Ukraine	Monthly	Kyiv	50,000	Russian, Ukrainian	since 2013
Vsesvit	bimonthly (every 2 months)	Kyiv	1,010 (2015)	Ukrainian	1925-1934, since 1958
Zhinka	monthly	Kharkiv (before 1946), Kyiv	1,700,000 (1973)	Ukrainian	since 1920

== See also ==
- List of newspapers in Ukraine
