= Law & Business (Ukrainian newspaper) =

- Type: weekly newspaper
- Founded: 1991
- Language: Ukrainian, Russian
- Headquarters: Krasnotkatska St. 42-a, Kyiv, Ukraine
- Website: zib.com.ua

Law & Business (Russian: Закон и Бизнес, Ukrainian: Закон і Бізнес, romanized: Zakon i Biznes) is Ukraine's weekly legal newspaper. It circulates to lawyers, judges, and general counsel from state offices. The paper reports legal information of national importance, including legal news for the business and private sectors, court decisions, verdicts, practitioners' columns, and coverage of legislative issues.

The newspaper was founded on 15 June 1991, and as of 2011 its print circulation was about 16,000. It is published in the Russian and Ukrainian languages. Both language editions and its archives are freely available online.

== See also ==
- List of newspapers in Ukraine
