= Dilova Stolytsya =

- Russian-language logo
- Type: Weekly newspaper
- Format: Broadsheet
- Editor: Inna Kovtun
- Founded: 2001
- Political alignment: Liberal
- Circulation: 50,000
- Website: www.dsnews.ua

Dilova Stolytsya (Ukrainian: Ділова столиця, Russian: Деловая столица, translated as Business Capital (city)) is one of Ukraine's main business newspapers published weekly. It's also an online media known as DSnews. It contains news and analytics about Ukrainian political life, economy, banks, companies&markets, real estate. Dilova Stolytsya is a member of UAPP. It's the first business newspaper of Ukraine, which began to use full-color printing. The newspaper become profitable after 6–9 months after the launch.

In March 2014, Hubs reported, citing its own sources, that the new owner of Kartel was Oleg Bakhmatyuk, the owner of the Avangard agricultural holding, but Bakhmatyuk's spokeswoman denied this information.

== See also ==
- List of newspapers in Ukraine
