= Odessaer Zeitung =

Former German-language newspaper

- Founder: Louis Nietzsche
- Editor-in-chief: Karl Wilhelm
- Founded: 1861
- Ceased publication: 1918
- Language: German
- Headquarters: Odessa

The Odessaer Zeitung (English: Odessean Newspaper) was a German newspaper from Odessa, founded in 1861. It was published 3 times a week, later daily, except on Sundays and holidays. Some of its volumes can be found at the library of the German Institut für Auslandsbeziehungen.
