= YUNA (music award) =

Annual Ukrainian music award

- YUNA logo
- Awarded for: Outstanding achievement in the music industry
- Location: Palace "Ukraine"
- Country: Ukraine
- Hosted by: Various
- Reward: Statue
- First award: 2012

Highlights
- Most awards: The Hardkiss
- Website: yuna.ua

Television/radio coverage
- Network: Inter (TV channel); Novyi Kanal; M1; Priamyi; 1+1
- Produced by: Pavlo Shilko

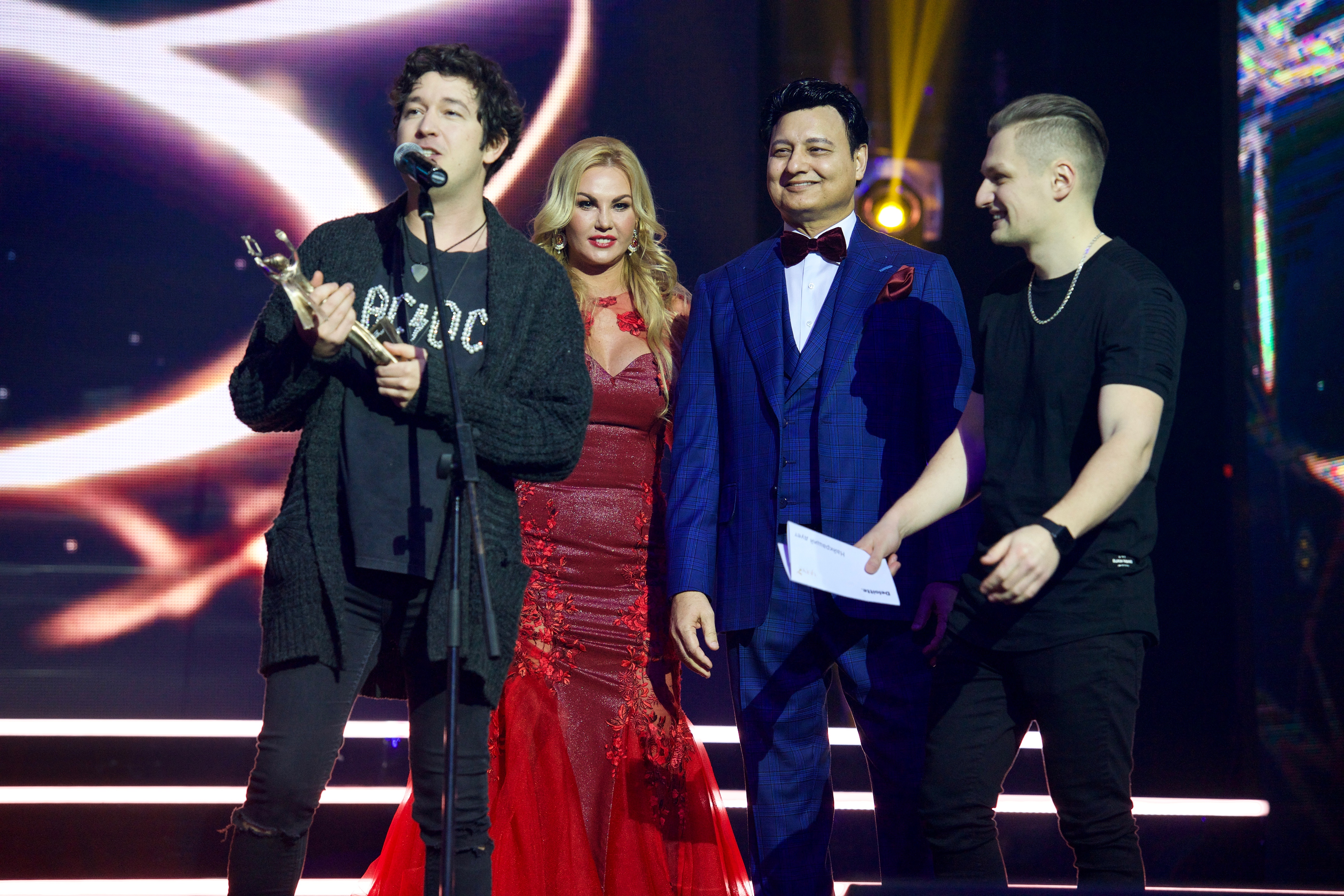
Mohammad Zahoor awarding the Best Duet prize to the bands Pianoбой and Morphom in 2018

YUNA (Yearly Ukrainian National Awards) is an annual Ukrainian music award ceremony, established on 27 October 2011 by Pavlo Shilko and Mohammad Zahoor, usually held at the Palace "Ukraine" theatre in Kyiv. Nominees and winners are determined by a professional jury. The first ceremony took place in 2012, and it has been held every year since. Its hosts have included celebrities such as singer Potap and television presenter Anatoly Anatolich. In 2020, a youth version of the award, called YUNA Junior 2020, also took place.

In 2022, due to the Russian invasion of Ukraine, the award ceremony was held online. The 2023 edition of the event only had one award category: Song of Indomitable Ukraine.

== Background ==
The award ceremony was established on 27 October 2011 by radio and television presenter Pavlo Shilko and businessman Mohammad Zahoor. Nominees and winners are determined by a professional jury, and the accounting firm Deloitte regulates the final vote tally.

== History ==
The first YUNA ceremony, which took place on 8 February 2012 at Palace "Ukraine" in Kyiv, honored the best in Ukrainian music spanning the twenty years since the country's independence in 1991 and was later named "YUNA: The Best of 20 Years". The event didn't have a host; rather, awards were presented by different celebrities. From 28 nominees, who had been announced on 12 December 2011, the jury selected 9 winners.

The second YUNA ceremony, celebrating the best in Ukrainian music for the previous year, was hosted by singer Potap. It added two new categories, namely Best Duet and Breakthrough of the Year.

The 2014 YUNA gala was held under the slogan "YUNA – Music Unites! / YUNA – Get United!"

The 2015 event came with the slogan "Ukraine. Music. The Best!"

The fifth YUNA ceremony took place on 25 February 2016.

The sixth edition of the event was held on 21 February 2017 and was again hosted by Potap.

In 2018, YUNA was hosted by Anatoliy Anatolich.

The eighth edition of the ceremony took place on 22 March 2019.

The 2020 event was held on 9 July. That year, a youth version of the award, called YUNA Junior 2020, was also organized.

The tenth ceremony was held on 12 May 2021.

In 2022, YUNA was scheduled for 16 March, but due to the Russian invasion of Ukraine, it was held online on 17 July instead. The event's host, television presenter Volodymyr Ostapchuk, and producer Pavlo Shilko, announced that winners would not receive their trophies that year. Instead, they would be auctioned off, with proceeds being donated to the Ukrainian military.

The twelfth ceremony was again held online, on 18 April 2023, and it only had one award category: Song of Indomitable Ukraine. According to updated YUNA regulations, adapted to the realities of martial law, the jury selected winners from a top-100 list of most-frequently played new songs on Ukrainian radio stations from the previous year, starting from the Russian invasion.

The 2024 event took place on 23 May, at the International Center of Culture and Arts of the Federation of Trade Unions of Ukraine, in Kyiv.
