= Ukraine Online =

Independent media

- Available in: Ukrainian
- Founded: July 2019
- Headquarters: {{{location_country}}}
- Creator: anonymous
- Industry: news
- Website: t.me/UaOnlii

Ukraine Online (UaOnlii) is an independent media with the largest in Ukraine news Telegram channel that covers social and political topics. The media also systematically organizes charitable collections to support the defense forces of Ukraine. It is ranked among the top 3 Telegram channels in Ukraine according to the Ukrainian Institute of Media and Communications. It became one of the most visited media in Ukraine after Russia invaded Ukraine in February 2022 due to its quick response and instant updates, which was crucial for civilians in the first months of the full-scale war.

== Overview ==
Ukraine Online was created on 5 July 2019.

The first significant increase in subscribers occurred in March 2019 during the presidential campaign and elections. The active audience of the channel grew to 150,000 subscribers.

The second noticeable increase in readers to 400,000 subscribers occurred during the coronavirus epidemic events from March to May 2020.

On 24 February 2022, following the start of a full-scale invasion, the channel's journalists were among the first to confront the information war and began to combat misinformation. The channel then began to grow rapidly, with 70,000 subscribers added on the first day. By 4 August 2022, the number of channel subscribers exceeded one million.

From 22 May 2023, the channel switched to the Ukrainian language; before that, news was published in Russian.

Ukraine Online is among the top five largest political Telegram channels in Ukraine.

From the first days of the major war, the channel engaged in the volunteer movement and began actively organizing collections for the Ukrainian army.

In the summer of 2023, Ukraine Online, in collaboration with charity initiative KOLO, raised 6 million hryvnias for the purchase of the LELEKA unmanned aerial vehicle complex. The primary content of the channel is breaking news, especially about politics, corruption, and scandals. Due to connections and continuous assistance to the Ministry of Defense, the Main Intelligence Directorate, and external intelligence, the channel is provided with a lot of unique information that serves as a primary source.
