= Ukrainian Gothic Portal =

Music and culture publication

Ukrainian Gothic Portal: Magazine "Gothica"
- Chief Editor: Vitaliy Stranger, Andrey Featon
- Categories: Music and subculture magazine
- Frequency: Trimestrial
- Publisher: UGP
- Paid circulation: 5,300
- Unpaid circulation: 700
- Total circulation: 6,000 (ABC January–June 2009)
- Founded: 1999; 27 years ago
- Country: Ukraine
- Language: Russian, Ukrainian, English
- Website: http://gothic.com.ua

Ukrainian Gothic Portal (abbr. UGP, Ukrainian: Український Готичний Портал) is a printed magazine, web-portal and promotion agency of gothic / dark / electro scene in Ukraine, Russia and Belarus. UGP was established in 1999 on basis of unofficial closed subculture formation Kiev Gothic Clan (KGC) and was officially registered in 2000 on the domain gothic.com.ua. The founder and ideologist of UGP was the author of gothic-related publications, Vitaliy Stranger. In 2000–2005, UGP became one of the leading dark music-related agencies in Ukraine and Russia, covered by local and international press, organizing festival "Deti Nochi: Chorna Rada", publishing printed magazine "Gothica", releasing CDs on label "Tridens", making its own radio program and TV appearances.

Cooperation partners of UGP became such festivals as Wave-Gotik-Treffen, Castle Party, such magazines as Zillo, Orkus and other organizations in Europe. The aims of UGP were the creation, development and coverage of gothic / dark / electro scene in Ukraine and in all countries of ex-USSR as well as uniting scene-fans and admirers of respective aesthetics.

Among the most famous projects of UGP:

- Festival Deti Nochi: Chorna Rada (2000) is gothic/dark/electro event in Ukraine, Russia, Belarus and other countries of ex-USSR
- Label Tridens Records (2003) is gothic/dark/electro studio in Ukraine
- Printed magazine Gothica (2006) is a Russian-language music magazine

== Projects ==
Since 1999 the numerous projects had been launched for the achievement of assigned aims. UGP conducted following functions:

- As a multifunctional online portal gothic.com.ua it developed informational and news resources (publication of materials, reportages and photo galleries from various events in Ukraine, Russia, Belarus, Germany, Poland etc.), started specialized sections (“Music”, “Cinema”, “Literature”, “Architecture”, “Photo”, “Art”, “Translations”), designed sites of bands (Komu Vnyz, Fleur, Holodne Sonze etc.) and official Russian-language sites of festivals (Wave-Gotik-Treffen, M’era Luna, Castle Party), and also began to create and manage interactive services (GothicJournal, GothicGallery, BlackPages).
- Being a management, production and booking agency, it supported various bands, among them are Komu Vnyz, Flëur, Dust Heaven, Holodne Sonze.
- UGP organized more than 20 performances of bands and Djs, whom it supports, in Europe, Ukraine and CIS at the international festivals: Wave-Gotik-Treffen (2002, 2004, 2007), Castle Party (2001, 2005, 2007, 2008, 2009), Prague in Dark (2006), Electro Prague (2007). In 2010 UGP started to work with Russian band Otto Dix and organized their concert on Castle Party 2010.
- As an organizer of the concerts in Ukraine, UGP organized the concerts Diary of Dreams (Germany), Deutsch Nepal (Sweden ) and other international and domestic bands.
- It also began to issue and license the material of supported bands in Germany and Poland for such compilations as "Gotham", "Dark East", "Castle Party" and also helped bands to take part in remix-contests: Gray/scale for Wumpscut, Funker Vogt, Agonized by Love, Deathcamp Project, Holodne Sonze for L'Âme Immortelle.

== Achievements ==
As achievements of UGP, praised by local Ukrainian press, can be stated the organization of the concerts of three Ukrainian bands (Komu Vnyz, Dust Heaven, Grayscale) at festival Wave-Gotik-Treffen at once in both 2004 and 2007.

Team of UGP continues to increase its activity in Ukraine, Russia and Belarus as well as in other European countries and works on one more book about gothic-scene in ex-USSR and Europe.

== See also ==
List of magazines in Ukraine
