= Peremoha (newspaper) =

- Type: Weekly newspaper
- Editor: Oleksandr Motsny
- Founded: February 23, 1932; 93 years ago
- Language: Ukrainian
- Headquarters: Krasnopillia, Sumy Oblast, Ukraine
- Circulation: 1,500 (as of 2023)

Peremoha (Ukrainian: «Перемога», lit. 'Victory', pronounced [pereˈmɔɦɐ]) is a weekly independent newspaper published in Krasnopillia, Sumy Oblast, Ukraine.

== Operations ==
Peremoha is published weekly, usually filling about eight pages. The paper is funded through "a few hundred" subscriptions and by grants and donations. The paper is printed in Vinnytsia and then transported to Kranopillia for distribution.

In early 2022, the paper reported circulating 3,000 copies. By 2023, numbers had dropped to 1,500, as many subscribers left the area following the Russian invasion.

As of May 2024, the paper was staffed by four people. The newspaper's editor is Oleksandr Motsny, who joined the staff in 1995 and became head editor in 2017.

== History ==
For the majority of its history, Peremoha focused primarily on local issues, "such as small businesses, farmers and milestone birthdays".

Beginning in 2014, the paper began reporting on and providing resources to Ukrainian soldiers involved in the Russo-Ukrainian War.

In 2017, Peremoha became an independent publication owned by its staff, previously being publicly owned. The paper moved out of its former headquarters, settling at a nearby agricultural firm where staff rented two rooms. There, they later adopted a stray cat named Senia, making him the paper's mascot.

The paper continued to be published throughout the COVID-19 pandemic lockdowns, although staff struggled to raise adequate revenue through advertising.

On 24 February 2022, days before the paper's 90th anniversary celebration, Russia launched its invasion of Ukraine. As a town 15 km away from the Russia-Ukraine border, Krasnopillia was heavily impacted by the invasion. Newspaper staffers hid important documents and awards from Russian soldiers who looted the surrounding area.

During Russian occupation of the area, the paper paused publication. After Ukrainian forces took control of the area in April 2022, publication resumed on a smaller scale, in black and white. Peremoha's coverage shifted to report on the ongoing war, with one of its first stories reporting on efforts to bring a killed Ukrainian soldier through Russian military checkpoints. Krasnopillia is located near the only open border crossing between Ukraine and Russia, so the newspaper often publishes the names of freed Ukrainian prisoners of war, who return to Ukraine via the border crossing. The paper also publishes stories of the lives of local soldiers killed in battle.

The paper's reporters prioritize helping their community over immediate coverage; the paper's editor told NPR that when he hears of Russian strikes, "I go to the scene immediately...I help the wounded, help clear the rubble and only after that do I start reporting".

The staff of Peremoha also began a joint publication with the editors of Bilopilshchyna in Bilopillia; Spilnopillia is published monthly, comprising twelve color pages and content "about soldiers, information about mine dangers, and interesting community-related materials". It is funded in part through a grant from the Media Partnership Program of the International Research and Exchanges Board (IREX Ukraine).

In spring of 2025 the editorial office of the newspaper was forced to evacuate to Sumy due to Russian shellings of Krasnopillia. After a lull in publications, a new issue of the newspaper was issued on 5 September with the support of the National Union of Journalists of Ukraine.

== See also ==
- List of newspapers in Ukraine
