= Korrespondent =

Ukrainian Russian-language magazine

- Korrespondent's front cover issue no. 50 (23 December 2006)
- Editor-in-Chief: Vitaliy Sych
- Categories: Newsmagazine
- Frequency: Weekly
- Circulation: 50,000 per week
- Founded: 2002; 23 years ago
- Company: KP Media
- Country: Ukraine
- Language: Russian, Ukrainian (online version)
- Website: korrespondent.net/magazine/

Korrespondent (Russian: Корреспондент; Ukrainian: Кореспондент; literally: Correspondent) is a weekly printed magazine published in Ukraine in the Russian and Ukrainian languages. It is part of United Media Holding group, created by Boris Lozhkin and owned by Serhiy Kurchenko.

== History and profile ==
Korrespondent was established in 2002. The Korrespondent.net is its sister project - an influential Ukrainian and Russian-language online newspaper launched in 2000 and publishing part of the magazine's content online for free.

Korrespondent is a member of Ukrainian Association of Press Publishers (UAPP).

== Korrespondent rankings ==
Korrespondent was the first Ukrainian media to compose and publish various rankings of the society. Most popular among them are the annually updated "TOP 100 Most influential Ukrainians", "Rating of the richest people in Ukraine", Personality of the Year and "10 best cities for living In Ukraine".

=== Top 100 ===
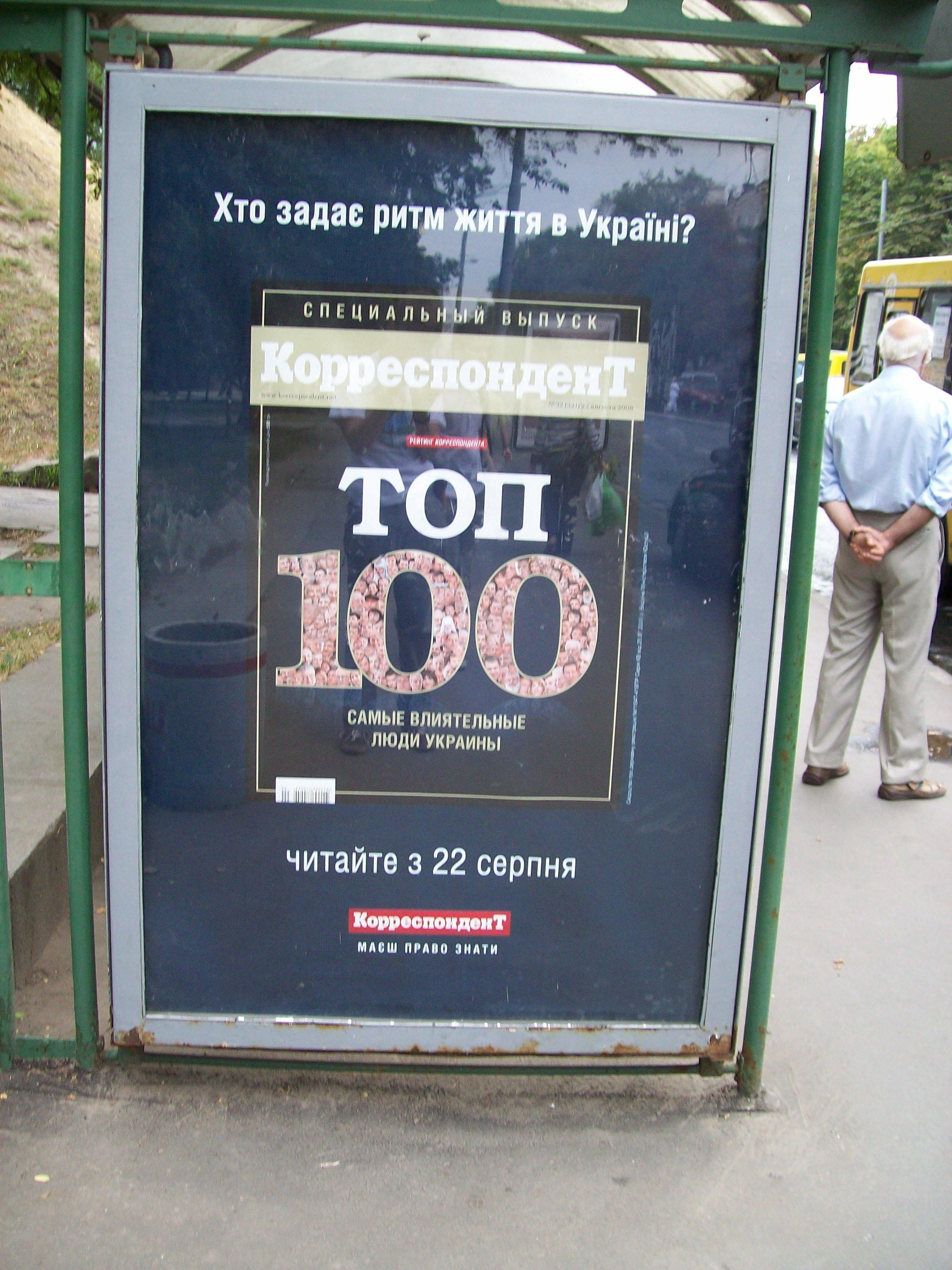
Korrespondent Ukrainian language poster on a bus stop in Kyiv, showing the front cover of the "Top 100" issue (summer 2008).

Since 2003 Korrespondent ranks the 100 most influential individuals who significantly influenced economic, business, political or societal development in Ukraine during the year. The list is published in the late August issue of the magazine. The people that have been ranked number one on Korrespondent's are:

Year	Ranked number 1	Age^{[a]}	Notes
2003	Leonid Kuchma	65	Prime minister of Ukraine (1992–1993), President of Ukraine (1994–2005).
2004	Leonid Kuchma	66	Prime minister of Ukraine (1992–1993), President of Ukraine (1994–2005).
2005	Viktor Yushchenko	51	Prime minister of Ukraine (1999–2001), President of Ukraine (2005–2010).
2006	Rinat Akhmetov	40	Ukrainian businessman and president of SCM Holdings.
2007	Viktor Yanukovych	57	Prime minister of Ukraine (2002–2005 and 2006–2007), the leader of the Party of Regions, President of Ukraine (since 2010).
2008	Yulia Tymoshenko	48	Prime minister of Ukraine (2005 and 2007–2010); the leader of the All-Ukrainian Union "Fatherland" party and the Yulia Tymoshenko Bloc.
2009	Yulia Tymoshenko	49	Prime minister of Ukraine (2005 and 2007–2010); the leader of the All-Ukrainian Union "Fatherland" party and the Yulia Tymoshenko Bloc.
2010	Viktor Yanukovych	60	Prime minister of Ukraine (2002–2005 and 2006–2007), the leader of the Party of Regions, President of Ukraine (since 2010).
2011	Viktor Yanukovych	61	Prime minister of Ukraine (2002–2005 and 2006–2007), the leader of the Party of Regions, President of Ukraine (since 2010).
2012	Viktor Yanukovych	62	Prime minister of Ukraine (2002–2005 and 2006–2007), the leader of the Party of Regions, President of Ukraine (since 2010).
2013	Viktor Yanukovych	63	Prime minister of Ukraine (2002–2005 and 2006–2007), the leader of the Party of Regions, President of Ukraine (since 2010).

=== Rating of the richest people in Ukraine ===
Since 2006, Rinat Akhmetov has always been declared Ukraine's richest person. Ihor Kolomoyskyi has always been ranked as either No.2 or No.3.

== See also ==
- List of magazines in Ukraine

== Notes ==
a. The age indicates how old the person was at the time of being nominated and not the person's current age.
