= Crimean chamber =

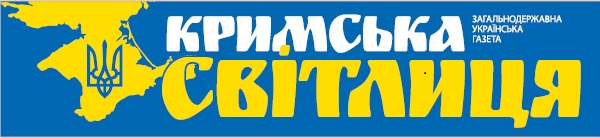
- One of the issues of the newspaper Crimean chamber
- Type: Weekly newspaper
- Format: B4
- Owner: Ministry of Culture of Ukraine
- Founder(s): Ministry of Culture of Ukraine, Prosvita Society, SE "National newspaper and magazine publishing"
- Publisher: SE "National newspaper and magazine publishing"
- Editor: Victor Merzhvynskyy (since 2016)
- Founded: December 31, 1992
- Language: Ukrainian
- Headquarters: Vasylkivska str., 1 Kyiv, Ukraine 03040
- Country: Ukraine
- Circulation: 1000
- Website: www.krymsvitlytsia.com.ua

Crimean chamber (Ukrainian: Кримська світлиця, in transliterated form "Krymska svitlytsia") is the only national Ukrainian newspaper in Crimea. It is published since 31 December 1992.

Its profile changed more than once during its existence, sometimes covering mostly social and political topics, sometimes becoming more literary and historical in its content, but always focusing on Crimean themes.

Since 2006 the "Crimean chamber" editorial works as a part of the state-owned enterprise (SE) "National newspaper and magazine publishing".

As a result of the Russian occupation of Crimea in March 2014, the publisher had to stop the printed version of newspaper since February 2015, so that for over a year the newspaper existed only in electronic format. However, by an order of the publisher's board of directors in May 2016 the newspaper's editorial got evacuated from the occupied peninsula to Kyiv, and after a forced break, since July 2016 the publishing of the printed version of "Crimean chamber" resumed in Kyiv.

The entire editorial staff of the newspaper "Crimean chamber" are people from Crimea.

Since 2017 is published under CC BY 3.0 license.
