= Mohammad Zahoor =

Ukraine-based British-Pakistani businessman and philanthropist (born 1955)

- محمد ظہور
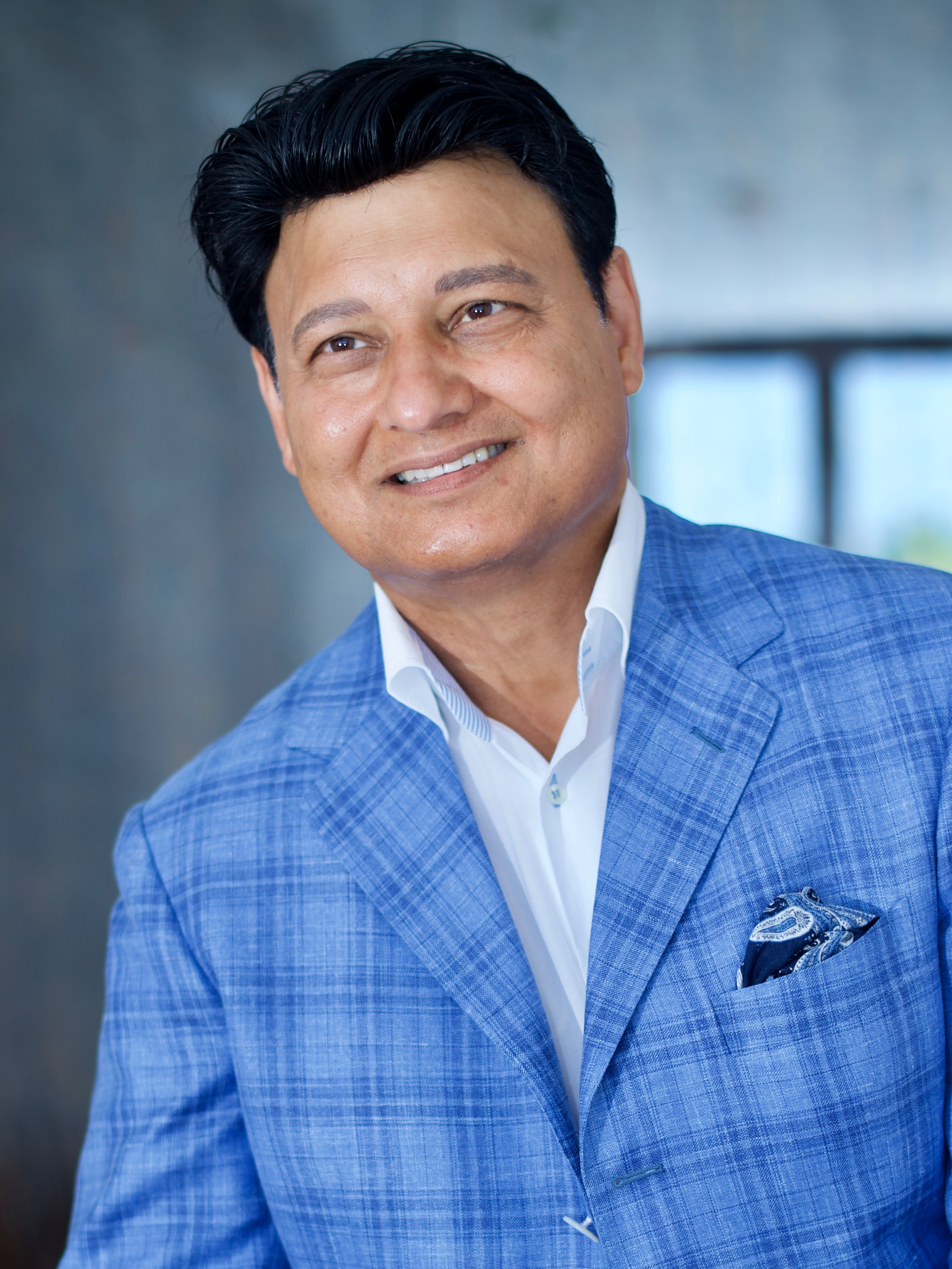
- Zahoor in 2017
- Born: 1 August 1955 (age 71); Karachi, Federal Capital Territory, Pakistan
- Education: Donetsk National Technical University
- Occupations: Businessman; philanthropist
- Spouse: Nataliya Shmarenkova (m. 2003)
- Children: 4

Mohammad Zahoor (born 1 August 1955) is a Ukraine-based British-Pakistani businessman and philanthropist. He is the founder and owner of the ISTIL Group, a diversified trading company that included a steel mill in Donetsk, which he sold in 2009 for between US$700 million and US$1 billion; a former owner of the Kyiv Post, which he sold for approximately $5 million; and a co-founder of the Ukrainian YUNA music awards.

Since the beginning of the 2022 Russian invasion of Ukraine, Zahoor has mobilized funds and aid to evacuate Ukrainian refugees to the United Kingdom and other parts of Europe. He has reportedly bought two fighter jets for the Ukrainian military, and has continued to meet with various heads of state and other influential figures to ensure safe passage for Ukrainian refugees.

== Early life ==
Zahoor was born in Karachi, Pakistan. His father worked for the Pakistani Civil Service.

He attended Junior & Senior Model School in Karachi. Then moved on to DJ Science College. During his first year at NED University of Engineering and Technology in 1974, he received a scholarship to pursue higher education in the Soviet Union. Zahoor studied metallurgy at Donetsk National Technical University (then Donetsk Polytechnic Institute) in the Ukrainian Soviet Socialist Republic; he later obtained his PhD from the same university in 2007. When he concluded his education in Donetsk, he had a five-year commitment to work at Pakistan Steel.

== Career ==
After earning his PhD from Donetsk National Technical University, Zahoor moved back to Pakistan to work at Pakistan Steel as a safety engineer. In 1987, he moved to Moscow where he entered a partnership with a Thai steelmaker and ran Metalsrussia, a Hong Kong-registered trading company.

In 1996, Zahoor bought Donetsk Steel Mill. He bought other steel mills in various countries.

In 2008, Zahoor sold Donetsk Steel Mill to Russian parliamentarian Vadim Varshavsky, for a sum believed to be around $1 billion.

In 2009, Zahoor bought the Kyiv Leipzig Hotel for $36 million. That year he bought Ukraine's oldest English language newspaper, the Kyiv Post, for $1.1 million from its founder, American-born Jed Sunden. In 2018, he sold the Kyiv Post to Syrian Adnan Kivan for $3.5 million.

Zahoor was interviewed by the Financial Times on the economic situation in Ukraine, specifically the prospects for inward investment.

Zahoor contributed to the Huffington Post on topics relating to Ukrainian/Russian economics and politics.

== Personal life ==
In 2003, Zahoor married Ukrainian singer Kamaliya. They have two twin daughters, Mirabella and Arabella. He has a daughter, Tanya, and a son, Arman, from his first marriage.

Ukrainian singer Kamaliya shocked fans in April 2023 with the news that she was divorcing Mohammad Zahoor. Zahur continues to provide for the former artist's financial needs after the divorce, she answered the question of presenter Zhenya Feshak for Lux FM. The presenter also asked how the ex-spouses divided their property after the divorce. As it turned out, no division took place.

== Philanthropy ==
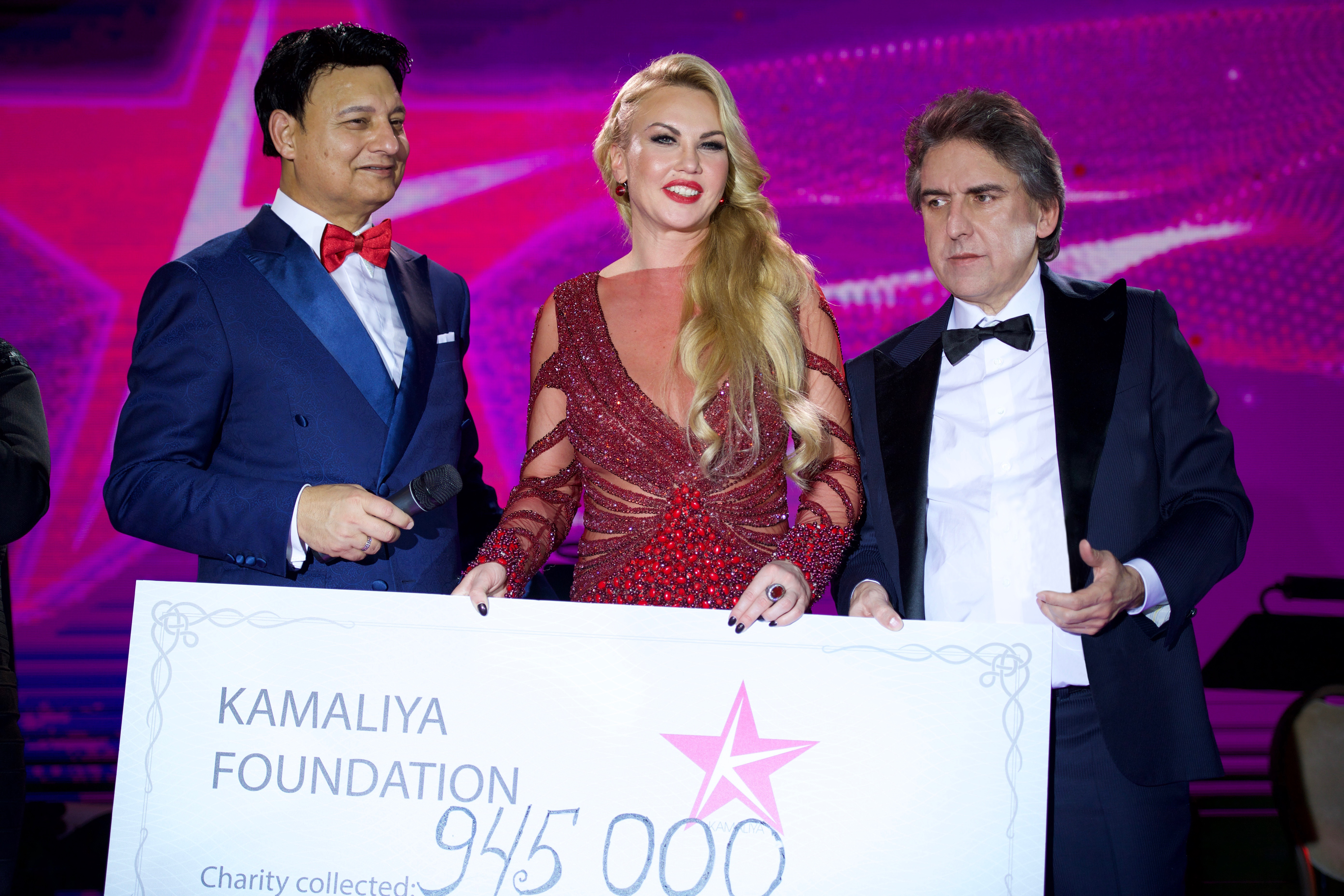
At the yearly charity event 4th St. Nicholas Charity Night in Ukraine, together with Ignace Meuwissen

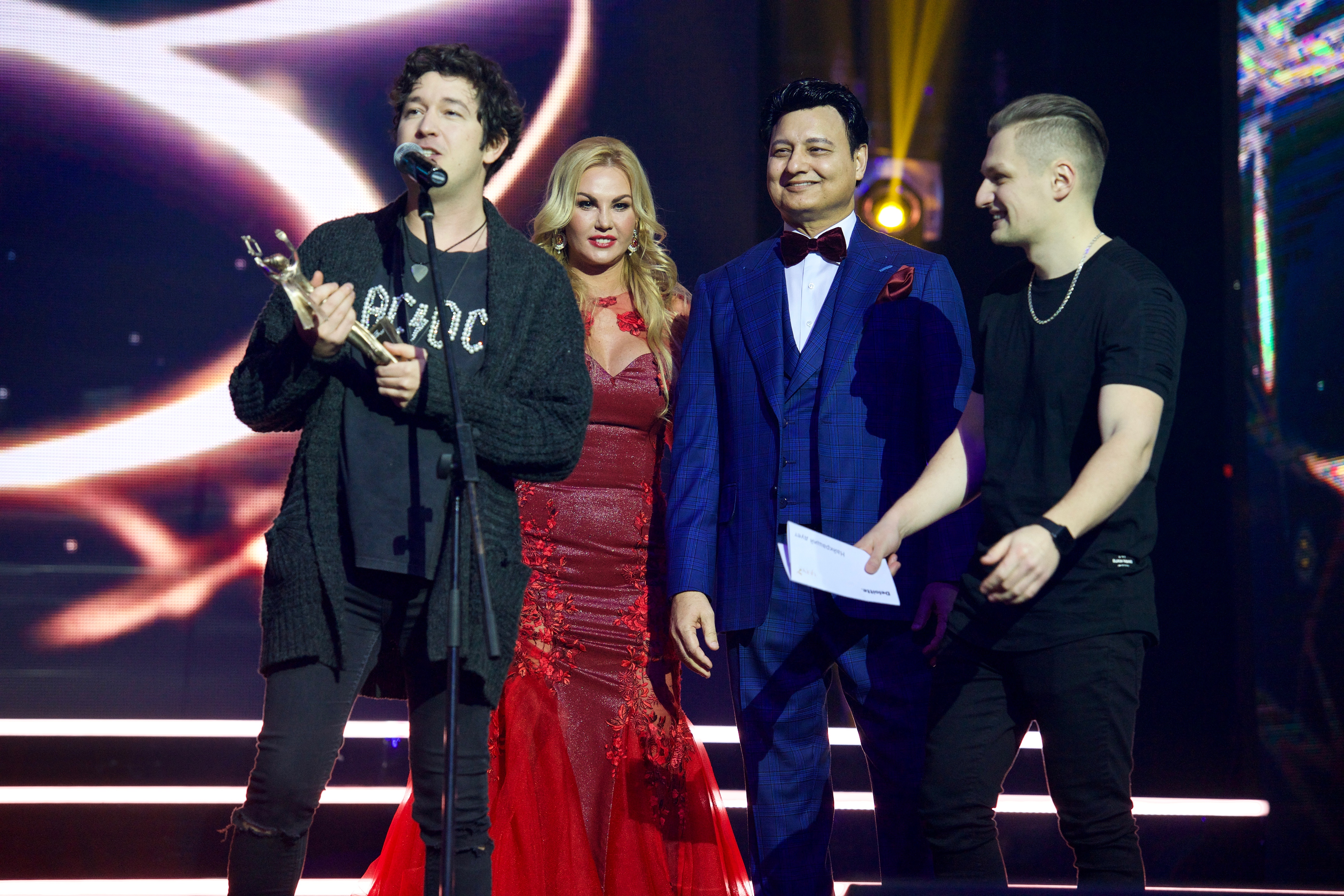
Awarding the Ukrainian bands Pianoboy and Morphom for best duet at YUNA 2018

Zahoor takes part in many different projects, in Ukraine and abroad. He donated to the restoration of the Odesa State Academic Opera and Ballet Theatre, a building in a university in Taxila, (North Pakistan), and the Cardiac Research Center in Pakistan. Zahoor supports sport teams and the Ice Hockey Federation of Ukraine.

He and Kamaliya founded the Kamaliya and Mohammad Zahoor Charitable Foundation to help children in need. The foundation organizes annual charity nights to raise money. Since 2015, the Foundation is supported by his close friend Ignace Meuwissen.

In 2017, during the annual charity event 4th St. Nicholas Charity Night in Kyiv, Ukraine, $50,000 was raised through auction and ticket sales for buying 10 Drager Siemens Infinity Delta XL patient monitors for the State Children’s Cardiac Center in Kyiv.

In 2011, Zahoor became the co-founder of the Ukrainian Music Awards (YUNA).

He supported sports initiatives. ISTIL was the official partner and general sponsor of the Ukrainian Hockey Federation, financing the national, youth and junior hockey teams of Ukraine. The company provided the necessary assistance for the development of the Academy women's handball team. Mohammad Zahoor also organizes and sponsors an annual summer cricket tournament for foreigners living in Ukraine."

== In the media ==
In 2013, Zahoor and Kamaliya appeared on Meet the Russians, a British reality show produced by FOX TV about wealthy Russians who live in London, England.
