= Kamaliya =

Ukrainian singer, Mrs. World 2008

Kamaliya Zahoor
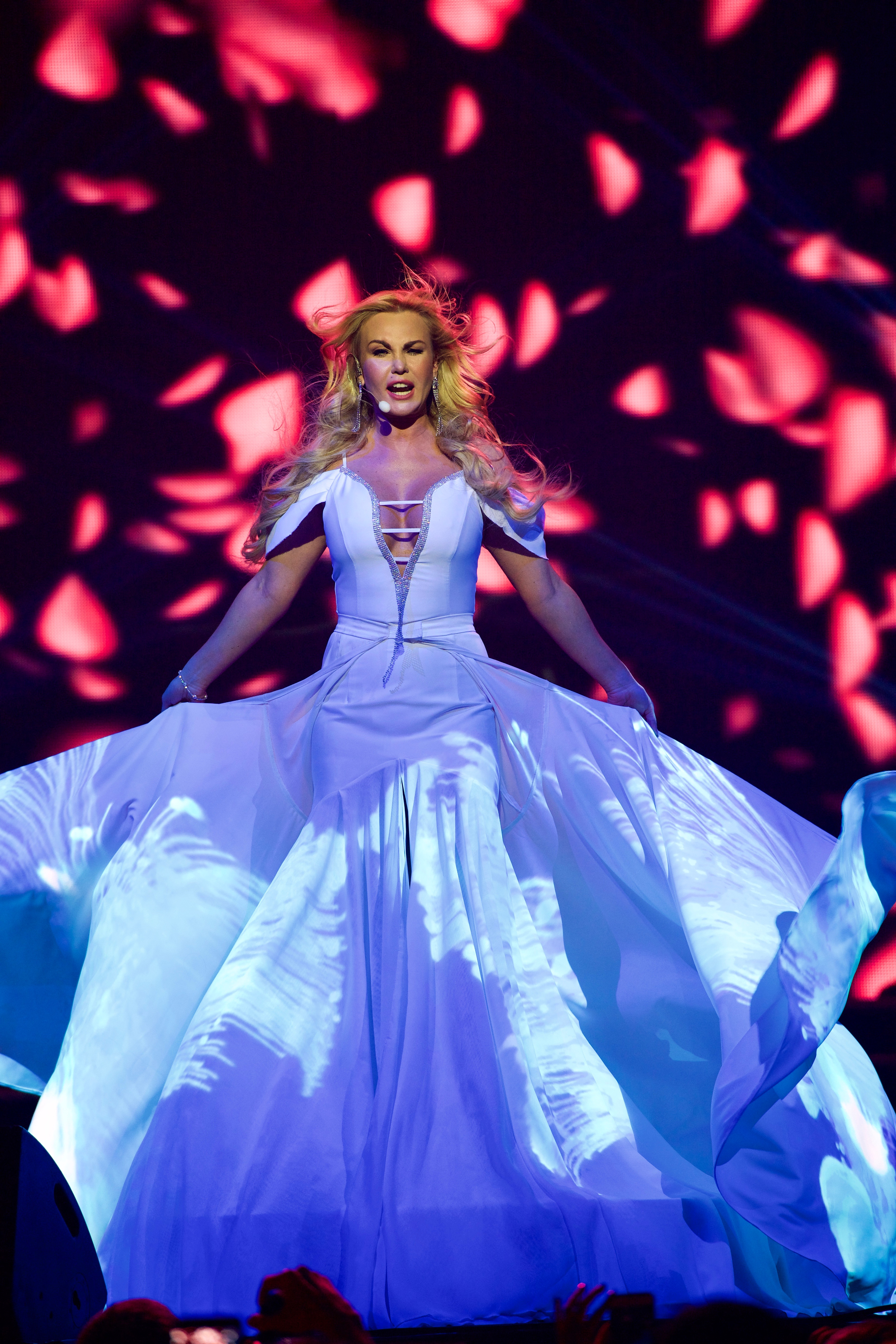
- Kamaliya at YUNA-2018

Background information
- Born: Nataliya Shmarenkova; 18 May 1977 (age 49); Chita Oblast, Russian SFSR, Soviet Union
- Origin: Lviv, Ukraine
- Genres: Pop; pop rock; synthpop; europop; eurodance; house; electropop; classical crossover
- Occupations: Singer; actress; television personality; model; philanthropist
- Years active: 1993–present
- Label: TanArm Music
- Website: kamaliyaofficial.com

Kamaliya Zahoor (Ukrainian: Камалія Захур, romanized: Kamaliia Zakhur, Russian: Камалия Захур; born Nataliya Viktorivna Shmarenkova on 18 May 1977), known professionally as simply Kamaliya, is a Ukrainian singer, actress, television personality, model and former Mrs. World beauty pageant titleholder. She has become widely known in the United Kingdom through her participation in the British reality television programme Meet the Russians.

== Early years ==
Kamaliya (real name Natalya Shmarenkova; Russian: Наталья Шмаренкова) was born in 1977 in Zabaikallye, Soviet Union. When she turned three, her military father was deployed to Budapest, where she danced and sang in the children's ensemble called "Kolokol'chik" (the Jingle). When her family later moved to Lviv, she took classes in violin and opera, and while in school, she took part in as many concerts and shows as possible. Her efforts were noticed and she received an invitation to sing with the Ukrainian folk music group "Halytska Perlyna" (Halych Perl).

== Career ==
In 1993, Kamaliya became the laureate of the Chervona Ruta (Red Rue) Festival in Ukraine and then won the TV-Chance-Stars contest in Moscow. In 1997, she graduated from the University of Culture with a degree in Variety Art and Mass Shows Direction. At this time, she recorded her first video clip "Techno style".

During 1999 and 2000, Kamaliya wrote more than 50 songs, and worked on her album "It is Love". In 2000, her song "Love You" won the first prize as the National Hit Parade's "Song of the Year". In 2001, she created the show-center "Kamaliya", which not only promoted her, but also organized gala concerts and shows and programs with participation Ukrainian, Russian and foreign stars.

In 2004, the President of Ukraine awarded Kamaliya with the title Honored Artist of Ukraine for her outstanding achievements in developing Ukrainian culture.

Kamaliya performed at the YUNA Music Awards 2011, 2012, 2013, 2014, 2015, 2016, 2017 in Ukraine, including a duet with Germany's Thomas Anders of "No Ordinary Love".

She was a headliner at the "Mr. Gay World 2012" pageant in Johannesburg, South Africa. Kamaliya performed at Ahoy, Rotterdam at Symphony 31 "DJ meets Orchestra" on 14 & 16 March 2015. Kamaliya is a regular performer at the Gay Prides in Germany, UK, Ireland & the Netherlands.

=== Beauty contests ===
In 2003, she became "Miss South Ukraine" and "Miss Open – Odesa".

==== Mrs. World 2008 ====
On 30 June 2008, Kamaliya won the Mrs. World pageant. The event took place in Kaliningrad, Russia.

In 2009, she was in Vietnam to pass her tiara on to the 2009 Mrs. World, Russian Victoria Radochinskaya.

=== Music ===
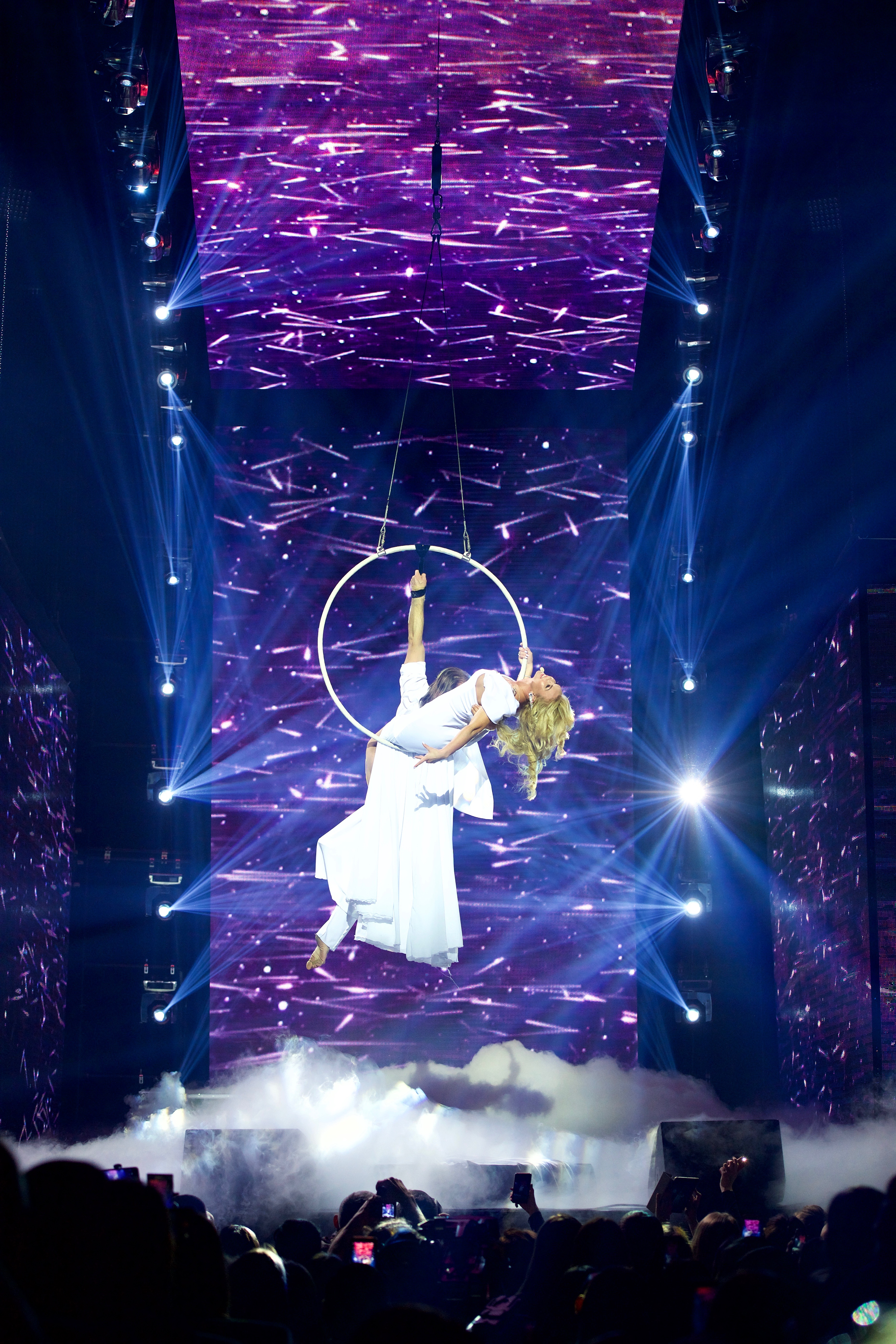
The first presentation of the Ukrainian version of the hit "Timeless" at YUNA-2018

In December 2011, Kamaliya released her debut UK single "Crazy in My Heart". The track was mixed by the UK dance duo Digital Dog.

Kamaliya's second UK single "Rising UP" was released on 26 February 2012. The single featured mixes by UK dance ensemble Cahill and US production wizards Soulseekerz. The video for this single was shot in Miami by Paul Boyd, in a luxury villa used in CSI: Miami.

Recent notable performances include as a support act to the STEPS reunion tour across the UK. Kamaliya performed as a supporting act to STEPS on all tour dates except two (when she was in South Africa to headline Mr. Gay World). These appearances coincided with the launch of her 3rd single "Arrhythmia" – an Ibiza-inspired dance anthem.

Kamaliya also released her debut UK album Kamaliya onto digital websites and for free with OK! magazine on 7 August 2012.

In 2013, Kamaliya released her new album, ClubOpera, which was written and produced for her by Uwe Fahrenkrog-Petersen and DSign Music. Prior to its release, she released 4 singles out of this album. Those were "Butterflies" (2012), "I'm Alive" (2013), "Love Me Like" (2013), "Never Wanna Hurt You (Bad Love, Baby)" (2013).

In 2015, she recorded a single with José Carreras for his concert in the German city of Braunschweig. She continued her cooperation with Uwe Fahrenkrog-Petersen, and in March 2016 she released her first single "Timeless" from her next album with the same title. The song was No.1 for 8 weeks in the Austrian & Dutch charts, and in the Top 15 in German and Swiss charts.

In January 2017, her collaboration with Uwe Fahrenkrog-Petersen culminated in "Aphrodite", which reached the second position in German and Spanish official charts, Austrian and Turkish iTunes charts.

In February 2017, to commemorate the 30th anniversary of Sananda Maitreya's (formerly known as Terence Trent D'Arby) hit "Sign Your Name", she presented her version of the song at YUNA Music Awards. Produced by the English producer Stuart Epps the single became a huge hit in Italy.

In July 2017, the album Timeless was released. Besides "Timeless" & "Aphrodite", "Make Me Feel" & "On My List" did very well in European charts. "Make Me Feel" was No.1 in Ireland.

When the album ClubOpera was out in 2013 the song "Who's Gonna Love You Tonight" was not released as a single but it was so catchy that fans all over the world wanted it to be a single. In October 2017, with a slight change in the music, it was released.

In 2018, there appeared a Ukrainian version of the song "Timeless" – "Рiки Кохання".

In 2018, Kamaliya released another Ukrainian song – "Самба Тропикана".

In 2018, Kamaliya got a golden disc status in Austria for singles "I'm alive" and "Timeless".

In 2018, Kamaliya performed in Kyiv with Spanish opera star Montserrat Caballe.

In 2019, Kamaliya released another Ukrainian song – "Вiльна".

In July 2019, Kamaliya is planning to release her Spanish inspired Ukrainian duet with hot Latinos Duo #RicoMacho "Наше лiто".

=== Film and television ===
In 2009, Kamaliya filmed a television pilot Coffee with Kamaliya where she interviewed celebrities.

Kamaliya's first film role was in the comedy film Muzh Moey Vdovy (Russian: Муж моей вдовы, "My Widow's Husband"). The movie had its theatrical release on 1 April 2010, in Ukraine and Russia.

She also appeared in the 2013 American action film Officer Down as Katya. She also played a lead role in sci-fi movie called Mantera.

In 2012, she filmed scenes for a role in the American film What About Love, starring Sharon Stone and Andy Garcia; as of February 2023 the film has not been released.

Kamaliya also featured in many TV series and movies: Fathers and sons (И отцы, и дети); "Russian 8-episode serial"; Bagarne effect (Эффект Багарне); "Russian 8-episode serial"; and Million Up to the sky (Миллион до неба); "Russian TV movie".

She also featured in the reality shows: Riches cry too (Богатые тоже плачут) (Ukrainian TV), Meet the Russians (FOX). Also on: The lifestyle of the Rich and Famous (NBC); How The Other Half Live (UK Channel 5); and on TV channels in Germany, UK, Poland, the Netherlands, Russia, Australia, Austria, Italia, Japan, the US, etc.

In 2017, Kamaliya took part in the Ukrainian TV show Dancing with the stars.

In 2018, Kamaliya became a star singer of the Ukrainian TV show Voice-8 and sang a Ukrainian folk song "Mesyats na nebi".

== Personal life ==
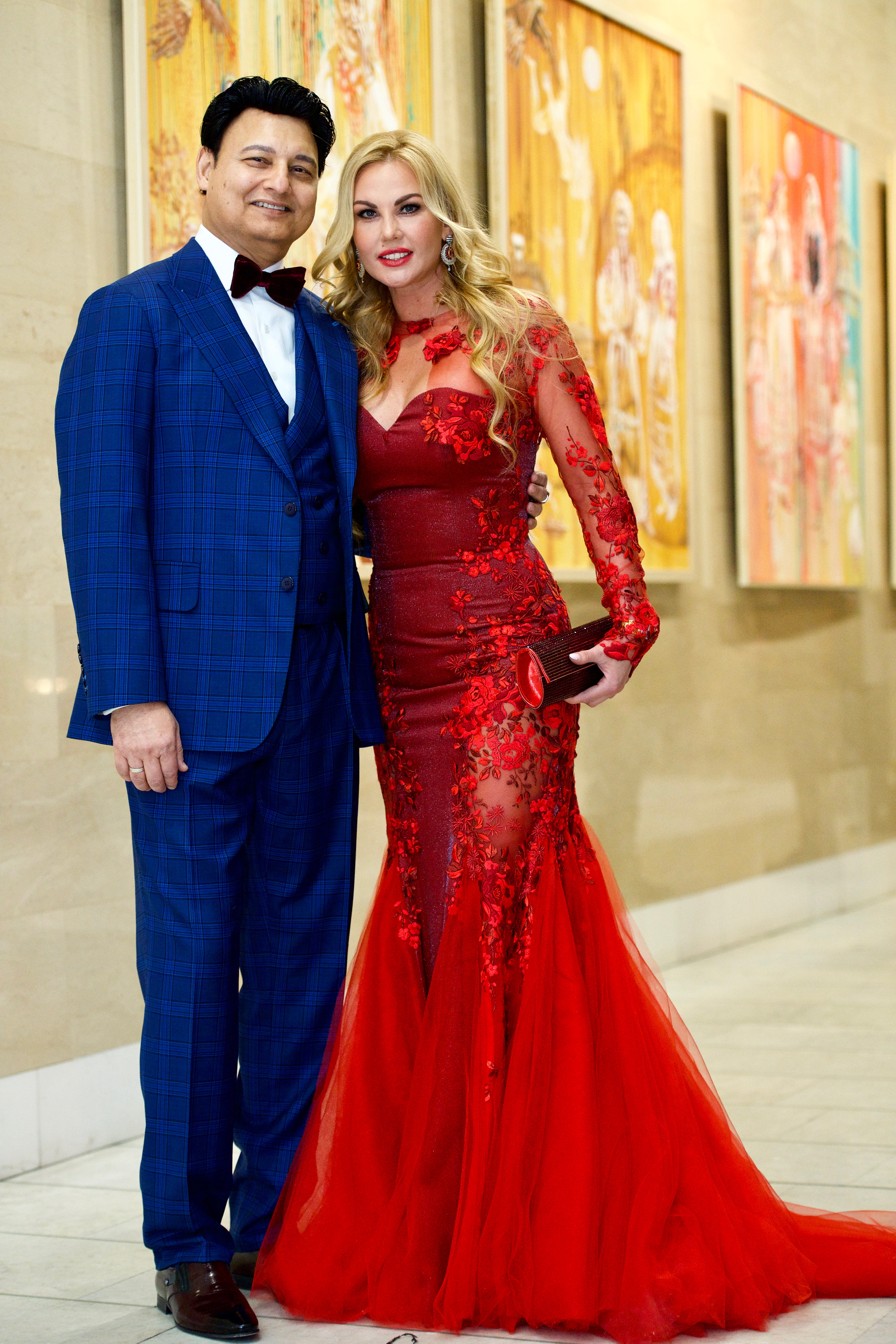
Kamaliya with her husband Mohammad Zahoor in 2018

In 2003, she married British/Pakistani businessman Mohammad Zahoor.

On 6 September 2013, Kamaliya gave birth to twin girls.

== Charity work ==
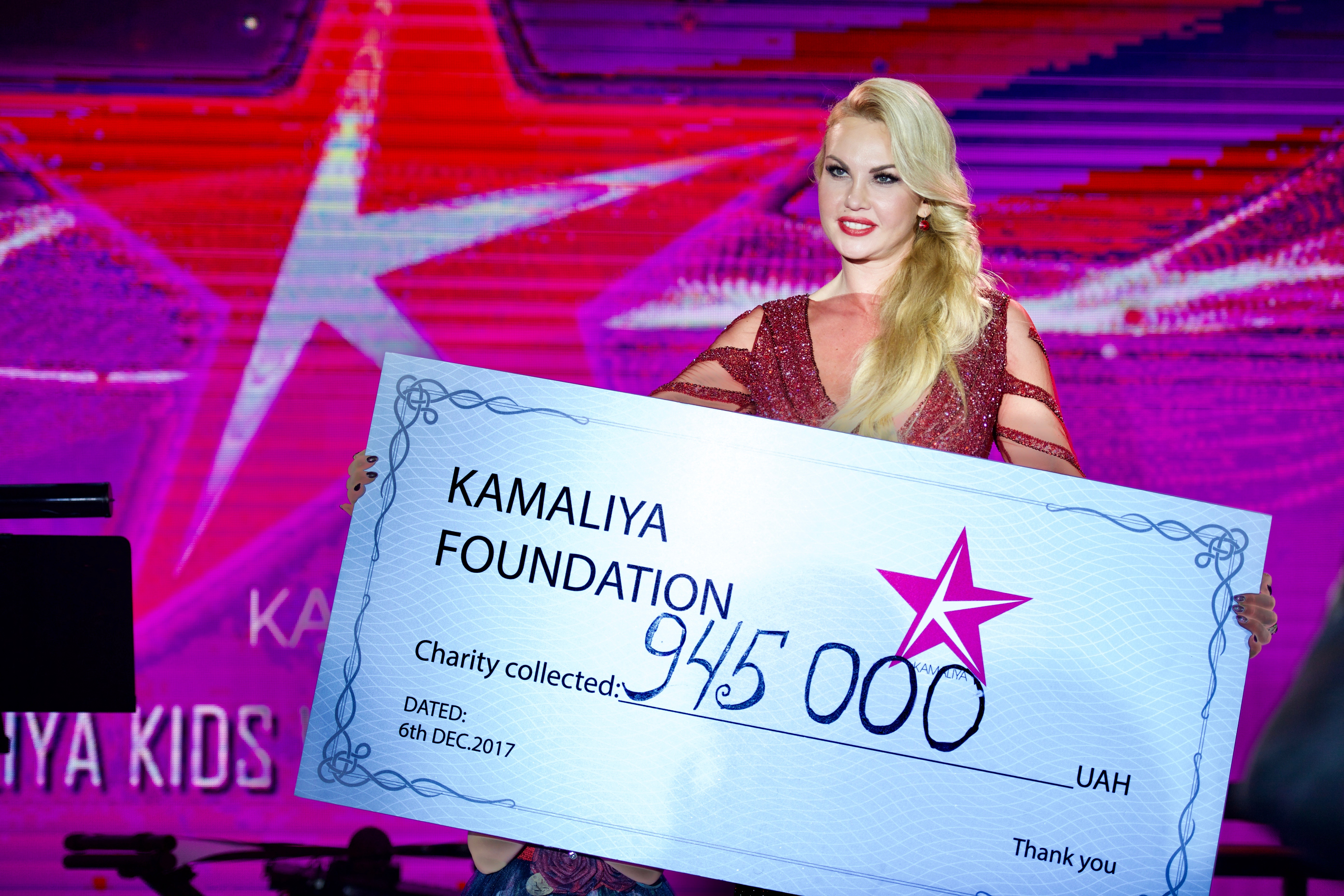
Kamaliya at the 4th St. Nicholas Charity Night (2017)

Kamalyia performed in orphanages from the age of 16. In 2005, Kamaliya took part in the All Ukrainian Charity Tour in support of children with AIDS. The President of Pakistan congratulated Kamaliya on her successful performance at the World Performing Arts Festival, Lahore, Pakistan. In 2007, she took part in the Svit talantiv Ukrayiny (All-Ukraine Children Festival), and undertook a charity mission to Pakistan by providing medicines, tents, food, blankets and other much-needed supplies.

In 2006, Kamaliya took part in an International Congress on Disaster Management in Islamabad as a Good Will Ambassador. She returned to Pakistan in 2007 on a charity mission where all of the proceeds were handed to the Pakistani government to fund the infrastructure of medical research facilities for children with heart problems, and to build a HIT education complex in Taxila. After this mission, Kamaliya won the prestigious "Person of the Year Award" alongside "Good Will Ambassador" awards.

Kamaliya has also taken part in an international charity program called "We Live on One Planet", to protect animals .On 23 February 2012, during a promotional trip to the UK, Kamaliya was asked to headline their annual fundraising party organized by World Society for the Protection of Animals (now known as World Animal Protection).

This alloy of philanthropic and music experience convinced Kamalyia to establish her own charitable foundation Kamaliya & Mohammad Zahoor Charitable Foundation in 2014. The Kamaliya Foundation helps orphanages, disabled people, and children with Down's syndrome. Besides other activities, the Kamaliya Foundation holds annual St. Nicholas Charity Nights to raise funds for its causes.

In 2017, Kamaliya held the annual charity event 4th St. Nicholas Charity Night in Kyiv, Ukraine where $50,000 was raised through auction and ticket sales for buying medical equipment for the State Children's Cardiac Center in Kyiv. In 2018, Kamaliya held the annual charity event 5th St. Nicholas Charity Night in Kyiv, Ukraine where $60,000 was raised through auction and ticket sales for buying medical equipment for the State Children's Cardiac Center in Kyiv.

== Discography ==
=== Albums ===
- Techno Style (1997) (Techno)
- Kamaliya, with Love (2001) (Dance)
- Year of the Queen (2007) (Dance, Pop)
- Kamaliya (2012; in both English and Russian including remix version) (Eurodance)
- Club Opera (2013) (Classical crossover, Dance, Eurodance, Trance, Electronic, Lirica)
- Timeless (2017)

=== Singles ===
Title	Year	Peak chart positions									Album
Title	Year	UKR	AUT	GER	IRL	NLD	SCT	SPA	SWI	UK	Album
"Игра с огнём" ("Playing with fire") (with Philipp Kirkorov)	2010										Kamaliya (Ru)
"Waiting"	2010										Non-album singles
"Send me down an angel"	2011										Non-album singles
"Rising up"	2011									6	Kamaliya
"Faking"	2011										Non-album singles
"Crazy in my heart"	2011									13	Kamaliya
"Arrhythmia"	2011									8	Kamaliya
"Never wanna hurt you"	2012									1	Club opera
"No ordinary love" (with Thomas Anders)	2012										Non-album singles
"Butterflies"	2012									1	Club opera
"I'm alive"	2013		3	55					72	2	Club opera
"Love me like"	2013									5	Club opera
"Timeless"	2016		7			95	30				Timeless
"Aphrodite"	2017						15	55			Timeless
"Sign your name"	2017										Non-album singles
"Make me feel"	2017						20				Timeless
"Wild child"	2017						9				Timeless
"Legend" (with Anne Judith Stokke Wik)	2017				90		11				Timeless
"Who's gonna love you tinight"	2017						14				Club opera
"Ріки кохання" ("Rivers of love")	2018										Non-album singles
"Fumes"	2018						36				Timeless
"Samba tropicana"	2018										Non-album singles
"Вільна" ("I'm free")	2019										Non-album singles
"Наше літо" ("Our summer") (with Rico Macho)	2019	40									Non-album singles
"Доню, не плач" ("Daughter, don't cry")	2019										Non-album singles
"Freedom"	2019										Non-album singles
"На різдво" ("For Christmas")	2019										Non-album singles
"Bésame mucho"	2020										Non-album singles
"Кофе" ("Coffee")	2020										Non-album singles
"Танцую" ("I'm dancing")	2021										Non-album singles
"Танцюю" (IKSIY Remix)	2021										Non-album singles
"You Gimme Lovin’"	2021										Non-album singles
"You Gimme Lovin’" (Funk-DeVice Remix)	2021										Non-album singles
"You Gimme Lovin’" (IKSIY Remix)	2021										Non-album singles
"Promise"	2021										Non-album singles
"Головокружение"	2021										Non-album singles
"Новий рік"	2021										Non-album singles
"Time Out" (RUS)	2021										Non-album singles
"Time Out" (UA)	2021										Non-album singles
"Війна"	2022										Non-album singles
"Чекатиму"	2022										Non-album singles
"Кулями"	2022										Non-album singles
"Кордони"	2022										Non-album singles
"Pretty Girl"	2023										Non-album singles
"Світло Є"	2023										Non-album singles

=== Music videos ===
- "Ангел снов"
- "Пока нет лета"
- "От заката до рассвета"
- "Таке ніжне почуття"
- "Метель"
- "Год были вдвоем"
- "Зонтик"
- "Скорый поезд"
- "Boom-Boom"
- "Ты - просто привычка"
- "Вдвоем"
- "Crazy in My Heart"
- "Rising Up"
- "No Ordinary Love"
- "Arrhythmia"
- "Butterflies"
- "I'm Alive"
- "Love Me Like"
- "Never Wanna Hurt You (Bad Love, Baby)"
- "Timeless"
- "Timeless" (Dutch Version)
- "Who's Gonna Love You Tonight"
- "Aphrodite"
- "Sign Your Name"
- "Рiки Кохання (Timeless – Ukrainian version)"
