= Kyiv Post =

English-language newspaper in Ukraine

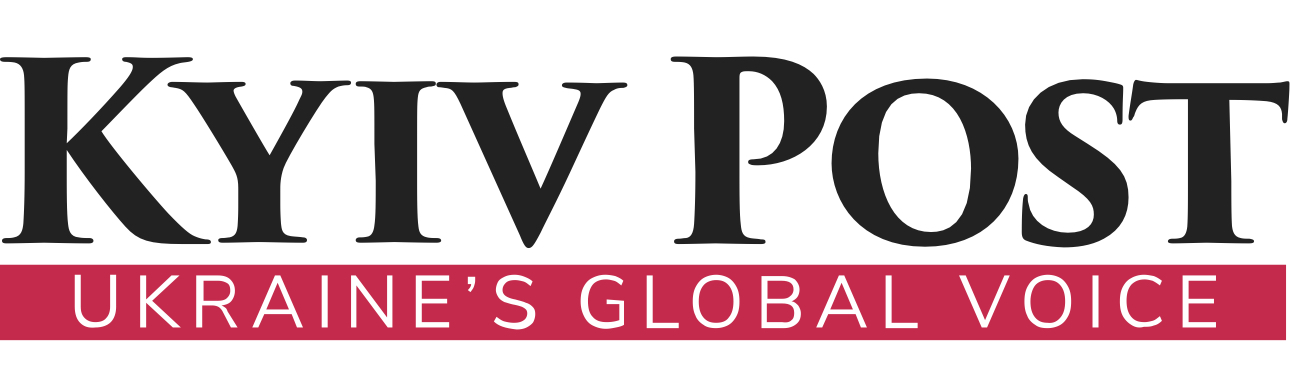
- Website type: News
- Available in: English
- Headquarters: 68 Zhylianska Street, Kyiv, Ukraine
- Owners: Ruslan Kivan, operating as Bisnesgroupp LLC
- Editors: Bohdan Nahaylo, Chief Editor
- CEO: Luc Chénier
- Website: www.kyivpost.com
- Commercial: Yes
- Registration: Not required
- Launched: 18 October 1995; 31 years ago
- Current status: Active
- ISSN: 1563-6429

Kyiv Post is Ukraine’s first and most prominent English-language newspaper. It was founded in 1995 in Kyiv by the American businessman Jed Sunden. In 2018, the publication was acquired by prominent Ukrainian businessman Adnan Kivan, the founder of KADORR Group.

On 11 November 2021, Luc Chénier returned to Kyiv Post as its CEO to rebuild, with his first hire being Bohdan Nahaylo as its Chief Editor. Within two months, Kyiv Post had doubled its readership, with a clear emphasis on being Ukraine's global voice and by focusing on the United States, Canadian, the UK, and the European Union markets. By year 3, Kyiv Post had 97% of its readership outside Ukraine, with an combined websites and social media viewership of more than 6 million viewers per month. In October 2023, Kyiv Post was the first news organisations in Ukraine to be given a 100% content transparency and accuracy rating for journalism standards according to global rating platform News Guard (others with a perfect 100% included The Washington Post, The New York Times and The Wall Street Journal).

Following Kivan's death in 2024, ownership passed to his son Ruslan. The newspaper’s CEO is Luc Chénier, and the Chief Editor is Bohdan Nahaylo.

Currently, the website is updated seven days a week, approximately 10 hours a day, and includes Kyiv Post exclusive content, news and photos from wire services and aggregated articles from other news sources about Ukraine.

== Foundation ==
American Jed Sunden founded the Kyiv Post weekly newspaper on 18 October 1995. Sunden created the newspaper in the early years following the collapse of the Soviet Union, starting with $8,000 in capital, three computers and a staff of seven people working from a small flat in Kyiv. The first 16-page issue was put out by an editorial staff of two people.

== History ==
The newspaper, which went online in 1997, serves Ukrainian and expatriate readers with a general interest mix of political, business and entertainment coverage.

Sunden's KP Media sold the newspaper to the British businessman Mohammad Zahoor on 28 July 2009. Zahoor owns the ISTIL Group and is a former steel mill owner in Donetsk. Zahoor published the newspaper through his Public Media company. In an interview with the Kyiv Post published on August 6, 2009, Zahoor pledged to revive the newspaper and adhere to its tradition of editorial independence.

After Zahoor bought the newspaper, he retained the entire editorial team. One of his first acts as publisher, however, was to eliminate the paid "massage" advertisements, saying he didn't want to own a newspaper that promoted ‘escort’ services. Zahoor sustained the policy of editorial independence, with limited exceptions. After the newspaper's editors endorsed Yulia Tymoshenko over Viktor Yanukovych for president in the 2010 Ukrainian presidential election, the publisher issued a policy to forbid editorial endorsements of any political candidate or political party, saying the newspaper should remain non-partisan even on its opinion pages. Zahoor relaxed the policy during the May 25, 2014 presidential election, when he and his wife, singer-actress Kamaliya, came out publicly in strong support of billionaire Ukrainian businessman Petro Poroshenko's election as president. While the newspaper was free to endorse any candidate for the election, its editorial board made no endorsement in the contest that Poroshenko easily won. Zahoor's purchase and significant investment improved a newspaper that had been badly affected by the Great Recession, a sharp downturn that struck the Kyiv Post particularly hard in October–November 2008. The Kyiv Post lost advertising and cut costs, but still ended the year in the black, the last profitable year of its existence. In the last months under Sunden in 2009, the newspaper's editorial staff shrunk to 12 members, its page count to 16 and its print distribution to 6,000 copies. Zahoor invested in journalists, increased distribution and improved newsprint. He boosted the page count—to 32 pages through much of 2010–2011, dropping back to 24 pages again through much of 2012-2013 and then to 16 or 24 pages since then. However, despite the investments, the Kyiv Post never regained consistent profitability, despite further staff and cost cuts, as print advertising continued to shrink, especially in the once all-important sector of employment advertising. However, combined with Zahoor's subsidies, the newspaper has been able to minimize financial losses through special publications, such as the Legal Quarterly, Real Estate and Doing Business supplements, as well as special events, including the annual Tiger Conference and others. The start of an affiliated nongovernmental organization, the Media Development Foundation, also raises money for independent journalism.

In 2010, the Ukrainian billionaire oligarch Dmytro Firtash filed a libel lawsuit against the Kyiv Post in the United Kingdom over a story about corruption in the gas trade industry. In December that year, the Kyiv Post began blocking internet traffic from the UK as a protest against English defamation law and the Firtash libel lawsuit in the United Kingdom. The case was dismissed, and the block was later dropped.

In October 2014, the Kyiv Post started a Reform Watch project to track the progress under President Petro Poroshenko and Prime Minister Arseniy Yatsenyuk in eliminating corruption and bureaucratic obstacles to democratic progress and economic growth.

On 21 March 2018, Odesa-based businessman Adnan Kivan, a Syrian native and Ukrainian citizen, purchased the Kyiv Post from Zahoor for a selling price both said was more than $3.5 million. Kivan pledged editorial independence of journalists in an interview with Kyiv Post former Chief Editor Brian Bonner. The newspaper is operated by his Businessgroup LLC. Kivan owns the KADORR Group of companies that specializes in construction and agriculture. His wife, Olga, and three children participate in his business. He used to be active in metals trading in the Black Sea port city from 1991-2007. In October 2024, Adnan Kivan suddenly died leaving the company to his son Ruslan Kivan to take over as CEO of Kyiv Postand Kadorr Group.

On 8 November 2021, the paper's website published a statement by owner Adnan Kivan announcing the temporary halt in operations of the newspaper claiming "One day, we hope to reopen the newspaper bigger and better." Reporters at the Kyiv Post replied in a joint statement that the sudden closure came on the heels of Kivan's attempt to "infringe" on their editorial independence. Some of these reporters founded a new English-language publication named The Kyiv Independent, which is funded by donations and published its first newsletter on 26 November 2021, and its website on December 2. Kivan later stated he intended to make the newspaper more advertisement-friendly. On 11 November 2021, Luc Chénier, whose background is in advertisement, was appointed as new CEO on the Kyiv Post. On 24 December 2021, Bohdan Nahaylo was appointed as new editor and the paper resumed publication.

In June 2022 the Ukrainian version of the site was launched.

In 2024 Following the passing of Adnan Kivan, ownership of the newspaper passed to his son, Ruslan.

== Editorial policy and news coverage ==
Sunden built the newspaper into a profitable enterprise, one that served the needs of the expatriate community that then regarded Ukraine as a potential hotspot for investment. He held to libertarian and anti-Communist views on the editorial and opinion pages, but established the business model of editorial independence on the news pages. He said the policy is good for business and news. Sunden was controversial for allowing paid "massage" advertisements from women engaging in ‘escort’ services.

Historically, the editorial policy has supported democracy, Western integration and free markets for Ukraine. It has published numerous investigative stories, including coverage of the 2000 murder of journalist Georgiy Gongadze, in which ex-Ukrainian President Leonid Kuchma is a prime suspect; the 2004 Orange Revolution, in which a massive public uprising blocked Viktor Yanukovych from taking power as president after the rigged presidential election of 26 November 2004; the 2013–14 EuroMaidan Revolution that overthrew Yanukovych as president; the Russian invasion of Crimea; the war in the Donbas region; and Oligarch Watch.

In 2013, the Kyiv Post covered what became known as the Euromaidan, which began on November 21, 2013, triggered by then-President Viktor Yanukovych's broken promise to sign a political and economic association agreement with the European Union. The Kyiv Post published hundreds of stories in print and online about the revolution, which ended in Yanukovych fleeing to Russia on February 21–22, 2014. The first Kyiv Post story about the revolution was published on November 22, 2013.

After Yanukovych and many members of his government took up exile in Russia, the Kyiv Post covered the formation of an interim Ukrainian government, the Russian annexation of Crimea on February 27, 2014, the start of the war in the Donbas in April 2014 and the May 25, 2014, election of Petro Poroshenko as independent Ukraine's fifth president after Yanukovych (2010–2014), Viktor Yushchenko (2005–2010), Leonid Kuchma (1994–2005) and Leonid Kravchuk (1991–1994).

=== Paywall ===
The Kyiv Post launched an online paywall in March 2013. The erection of the paywall became financially necessary because of the decline in print advertising in the newspaper industry generally, including at the Kyiv Post. During times of intense national crisis, such as the Euromaidan Revolution and the Russian invasion of Ukraine, the Kyiv Post has relaxed its paywall and made its coverage available freely for a limited amount of time. The website currently provides many categories of stories for free, including its aggregated content, its opinions and editorials and its multimedia offerings, including video, cartoons and photo galleries.

In November 2021 the online paywall was removed to allow more democratic access to all readers around the world and to help elevate its viewership at such a critical time in Ukraine’s history. This strategic move by Luc Chenier, CEO of Kyiv Post would help increase Kyiv Post's digital revenue by focusing on western audiences where markets such as the United States generally pay more for views on a programmatic platform.

== Chief editors and CEOs ==
The Kyiv Post has had 15 chief editors since its first edition on October 18, 1995. They include Andrea Faiad, Igor Greenwald, Askold Krushelnycky, Tom Warner, Greg Bloom, Diana Elliott, Scott Lewis, Paul Miazga, Andrey Slivka, Roman Olearchyk, John Marone, Stephan Ladanaj, Zenon Zawada and Jakub Parusinski.

The longest-serving chief editor is Brian Bonner, an American citizen who became the editor in the summer of 1999 and returned on June 9, 2008. He continued to serve until Nov. 19, 2021.

After Zahoor's purchase on July 28, 2009, he has had six chief executive officers, including American James Phillipoff (July 2009-July 2011), Michael Willard (July 2011-August 2013), Jakub Parusinski (September 2013-August 2014), Nataliya Bugayova (August 2014-December 2015) and Luc Chenier (August 2016 – March 1, 2018). Bugayova was the former chief of staff to Economy Minister Pavel Sheremeta before becoming the first Ukrainian and first woman to be CEO of Kyiv Post. Bugayova resigned to relocate and take a new job as the director of development for the Institute for the Study of War in Washington, D.C. Bugayova wrote her farewell column "Kyiv Post's values are made for new Ukraine" in the December 18, 2015, edition of the Kyiv Post. Commercial director Alyona Nevmerzhytska became acting chief executive officer in March 2016 until Chenier took over in August 2016. After Chenier's departure on March 1, 2018, Brian Bonner took over the duties of the CEO but retained his title as chief editor amid the transfer to Kivan's ownership.

On 11 November, the new CEO of Kyiv Post was announced, Luc Chénier. On 24 December 2021, Bohdan Nahaylo was appointed as a Chief Editor of the Kyiv Post.

== Awards and recognition ==
The Kyiv Post's longtime motto on its masthead was "Independence. Community. Trust." meant to underscore its commitment to high journalistic standards and ethical practices, in contrast to many Ukrainian news outlets where publishers and owners dictate editorial policy and advertising is disguised as news stories through the purchase of space known as "jeansa" or advertorials.

The newspaper changed its official motto to "Ukraine's Global Voice" in February 2018, when the slogan appeared in the first print edition and on the website home page under the masthead as per Luc Chenier’s suggestion while on his first assignment as CEO to better represent Kyiv Post’s global reach and impact.

In 2014, the Kyiv Post staff won the University of Missouri Journalism School's prestigious Medal of Honor for Distinguished Service in Journalism. The award was given to chief editor Brian Bonner and then-deputy chief editor Katya Gorchinskaya, who held the position from 2008–2015, at a ceremony at the journalism school in Columbia, Missouri, on October 28, 2014.

Also in 2014, Moscow-based AGT Communications Company released the findings of its survey from November 21, 2013 to May 21, 2014, that found the Kyiv Post is the most-quoted Ukrainian source of news by American and European news organizations and the second-most quoted in Ukraine and Russia, after Russia's Kommersant. The findings were based on citations in Factiva, the Dow Jones research database.

Five Kyiv Post journalists have also won six-month fellowships through the Alfred Friendly Press Partners program, administrated by the University of Missouri's School of Journalism. They were Anastasia Forina, who worked at the Chicago Tribune in 2014; Oksana Grytsenko, who worked at the Pittsburgh Post-Gazette in 2015; Olena Goncharova, who worked at the Pittsburgh Post-Gazette in 2016; Yulianna Romanyshyn, who worked at the Chicago Tribune in 2017; and Anna Yakutenko, who started her fellowship in March 2018. She was assigned to KCUR, the National Public Radio affiliate in Kansas City, Missouri.

In June 2022, Anna Myroniuk and Andrei Ciurcanu were runners up in the European Press Prize's Investigative Reporting Award for a story published in Kyiv Post. The story revealed how Chinese Tobacco manufacturers were supplying smugglers of millions of cigarettes into Ukraine.

In October 2023, Kyiv Post was the first news organisations in Ukraine to be given a 100% content transparency and accuracy rating for journalism standards according to global rating platform News Guard (others with a perfect 100% included The Washington Post, The New York Times and The Wall Street Journal).

== See also ==
- List of newspapers in Ukraine
