= List of cultural sites damaged during the Russo-Ukrainian war (2022–present) =

The list of damaged cultural sites during the Russian invasion of Ukraine is a list of cultural sites in Ukraine that have been verified by United Nations Educational, Scientific and Cultural Organization (UNESCO) as damaged and/or destroyed during the Russian invasion of Ukraine (which started on 24 February 2022). Despite that it was cited by many, the quality of this dataset remains not optimal. An examination of the April 2024 release showed that many entries suffer from incomplete information (e.g. imprecise description, missing geolocation, missing date of damage, missing multilingual title/description). Among the 351 damaged cultural properties they examined, only 211 met their criteria and were annotated and were included in their dataset.

Both Ukraine and Russia have signed the Hague Convention for the Protection of Cultural Property in the Event of Armed Conflict (the 1954 Hague Convention), which was drafted to safeguard cultural heritage during periods of armed conflicts. UNESCO is primarily responsible for the dissemination and monitoring of compliance.

== List ==
The list is current as of 10 Dec 2025 and based on information verified by UNESCO.

This includes 514 sites in total:

- 152 religious sites
- 268 buildings of historical and/or artistic interest
- 38 museums
- 33 monuments
- 19 libraries
- 1 archive
- 3 archaeological sites

== Chernihiv Oblast ==
Damaged sites in Chernihiv Oblast
Photo before	Photo after	Name/Description	In Ukrainian	Type	Populated place	Notes
		Building of the Chernihiv Regional Youth Center	Молодіжний центр Чернігівської області	Cultural centre	Chernihiv	Former cinema and youth centre. Several attacks by russian troops.
rahmenlos		Church of St. Theodosius	Церква Святого Феодосія	Church	Chernihiv, Yatsevo Cemetery	Orthodox church; damaged in the fighting.
		Military Historical Museum, a branch of the Chernihiv Historical Museum	Військово-історичний музей	Museum	Chernihiv	Chernihiv Historical Museum branch.
		Regional children's library	Дитяча бібліотека	Library	Chernihiv	Former Chernihiv Museum of Ukrainian Antiquities; severely damaged by Russian attacks.
		St Catherine's Cathedral	Свято-Катерининський собор	Church	Chernihiv	An 18th-century Orthodox church in the Ukrainian Baroque style; damaged by Russian shelling.
		Building of the Security Service of Ukraine	Будівля Служби безпеки України	Historic monument	Chernihiv	Former District Court (1904); destroyed by fire caused by Russian shelling: archive containing KGB files burnt.
		Sofia and Oleksandr Rusov Chernihiv Regional Universal Scientific Library	Чернігівська обласна універсальна наукова бібліотека імені Софії та Олександра Русових	Library	Chernihiv	Formerly a bank building (1913); the largest regional library (approx. 868,000 volumes).
		Church of Our Lady of Kazan	Свято-Казанська церква}	Church	Chernihiv	Built 1820–1827 in memory of the victory in the Franco-Russian War of 1812.
		Yatsevo Cemetery	Цвинтар в Яцево	Cemetery	Chernihiv	Archangangel Michael Chapel, consecrated in 2018 in memory of the soldiers who fell for Ukraine.
		Ascension Church	Bознесенська церква	Church	Lukashivka	First wooden church in 1781; Soviet era: warehouse; 2022: ammunition and fuel stored there by Russian occupiers; corpses exhumed from the site.
		Dormition Cathedral	Успенський собор	Church	Chernihiv	The monastery walls, gate, bell tower (17th century) and domes (11th–17th centuries) of the Yeletskyi Monastery of the Dormition of the Mother of God were damaged by Russian shelling.
		Mykhailo Kotsiubynsky City Library	Міська бібліотека ім. Михайла Коцюбинського	Library	Chernihiv	Building damage caused by a Russian air strike; heating system destroyed, part of the library collection lost.
		Chernihiv Regional Art Museum	Чернігівський обласний художній музей імені Григорія Галагана	Museum	Chernihiv	A 1865 building damaged by Russian troops.
		House of Culture	Будинок культури	Cultural centre	Ivanivka	The building housing the village library was damaged by rocket fire.
		Chernihiv Literary Memorial Museum-Reserve of M. M. Kotsiubynsky	Чернігівський літературно-меморіальний музей-заповідник Михайла Коцюбинського	Museum	Chernihiv	Damage to furniture and exhibits.
		Prayer Hall of the 2nd Christian Baptist Church	Молитовний дім 2-ї християнсько-баптистської церкви	Prayer house	Chernihiv	Direct Russian missile fire struck the basement, where over 20 people hid.
		Building of the Firefighters Society	Будинок пожежного товариства	Historic monument	Chernihiv	1912 built; after World War II served as a printing house and artists' association.
		Chernihiv Regional Taras Shevchenko Theater	Чернігівський обласний академічний український музично-драматичний театр імені Тараса Шевченка	Theatre	Chernihiv	Hit by a Russian Iskander missile: 181 casualties, severe structural damage.
		Desna Hotel Building	Будівля готелю «Десна»	Historic monument	Chernihiv	Former Commercial Court.
		Children's Dental Clinic	Дитяча стоматологічна клініка	Historic monument	Chernihiv	Damaged by Russian shelling; former residential building of Gleb Uspenski.
		Post Office	Пошта	Historic monument	Chernihiv	Façade damaged by Russian shelling.
		House of Culture	Будинок культури	Cultural centre	Semenivka	Repeatedly damaged by Russian drone attacks.
		Church of the Dormition of the Virgin Mary (built in 1801–04)	Церква Успіння Пресвятої Богородиці	Religious site	Novyi Bykiv	
		House of merchant Medvedev	Будинок купця Медведєва	Historic monument	Novhorod-Siverskyi	The building was in use as the local library, Russian drone attack damaged the building, the roof was destroyed and a large part of the library's collection was destroyed.
		Church of the Nativity of the Virgin Mary	Храм на честь Різдва Богородиці	Church	Hremiach	A small orthodox church built in 2014, destroyed by Russian shelling.

== Dnipropetrovsk Oblast ==
Damaged sites in Dnipropetrovsk Oblast
Photo before	Photo after	Name/Description	In Ukrainian	Type	Populated place	Notes
		Church of Saint Alexius	Свято-Олексіївська церква	Church	Velyka Dolyna	former school building; damaged by artillery fire from Russian occupiers.
		House of Culture	Будинок культури	Cultural centre	Berezove	
		Dnipro Art Museum	Дніпровський художній музей	Museum	Dnipro	Museum damaged by a Russian attack.
		Dnipro House of Organ and Chamber Music	Дніпровський Будинок органної та камерної музики	Church	Dnipro	Former Bryansk St. Nicholas Church; damaged as a result of a Russian missile strike.
		Church of Our Lady of the Sign	Церква ікони Божої Матері "Знамення"	Church	Nikopol	Orthodox church destroyed by Russian troops.
		Medical College	Медичний коледж	Historic monument	Nikopol	Former girls' gymnasium severely damaged by Russian shelling.
		Holy Dormition Church	Свято-Успенський храм	Church	Mezhova	Orthodox church, burned down due to a Russian drone strike.

== Donetsk Oblast ==
Damaged sites in Donetsk Oblast
Photo before	Photo after	Name/Description	In Ukrainian	Type	Populated place	Notes
		Sviatohirsk Holy Dormition Lavra	Свято-Успенська Святогірська Лавра	Monastery	Sviatohirsk	13th-century monastery repeatedly attacked by the Russian army, cultural heritage destroyed, people killed.
		Saint Nicholas Church	Церква Святого Миколая	Church	Volnovakha	Church honouring the 51st Independent Mechanised Brigade (fallen 2014) destroyed by Russian troops.
		Chapel of the Holy Martyr Tatiana	Каплиця святої мучениці Тетяни	Church	Mariupol	Chapel damaged during the siege of Mariupol.
		Christ the Saviour Church of Evangelical Christian Baptists	Церква Христа Спасителя ЄХБ	Church	Mariupol	Church damaged during the siege of Mariupol.
		Mariupol theatre	Донецький академічний обласний драматичний театр	Theatre	Mariupol	The theatre was struck during the Mariupol airstrike despite a clearly visible “CHILDREN” sign; approximately 600 civilians were killed. It reopened in 2025, presented by Russia as a cultural victory.
		Our Lady of Kazan Orthodox Cathedral	Церква Казанської ікони Божої Матері	Church	Marinka	Orthodox church destroyed.
		Monument to Metropolitan Ignatius of Mariupol	Пам'ятник митрополиту Ігнатію Козадіносу	Monument	Mariupol	Monument to a city founder destroyed by Russian invaders.
		Cathedral of St. Michael the Archangel, Mariupol	Собор Архістратига Михаїла	Church	Mariupol	Cathedral damaged by Russian shelling.
		Transfiguration Church	Спасо-Преображенська церква	Church	Volnovakha	Destroyed as a result of Russian shelling.
		Saint Nicholas Church	Свято-Миколаївська церква	Church	Bakhmut	Church from 1797 destroyed as a result of a Russian attack.
		Saint Demetrius Church	Свято-Дмитріївська церква	Church	Verkhnotoretske	Church building (1861) shelled during Russian occupation.
		Local History Museum	Маріупольський краєзнавчий музей	Museum	Mariupol	Museum building burned down by Russian shelling, exhibits destroyed.
		Livoberezhnyi Cultural Centre	Центр культури «Лівобережний»	Cultural centre	Mariupol	Used as a shelter for civilians during the siege of Mariupol, shelled by Russian troops.
		Yuriev's House	Будинок Юр'єва	Historic monument	Mariupol	Russian shelling damaged the facades, roof, and interior of the building.
		City Palace of Culture Ukrainian House	Міський палац культури «Український дім»	Cultural centre	Mariupol	Building in which civilians sought shelter from bombardment, shelled by Russian occupiers.
		Culture Palace Iskra	Центр культури «Іскра»	Cultural centre	Mariupol	Building (1960s, socialist modernism; interior with monumental mosaic panels), destroyed in an air strike.
		Kuindzhi Art Museum	Художній музей імені Куїнджі	Museum	Mariupol	Museum building destroyed in an air strike.
		Palace of Culture Youth	Палац культури «Молодь»	Cultural centre	Mariupol	Until its destruction by Russian occupiers, the building housed a centre for contemporary art.
		City Palace of Culture Chaika	Центр культури «Чайка»	Cultural centre	Mariupol	Building (1958) destroyed during the siege of Mariupol.
		Trinity Church	Свято-Троїцький храм	Church	Mariupol	Damaged during the siege of Mariupol.
		Art School	Художня школа	School	Mariupol	Building in which several hundred civilians sought shelter, bombed by Russian troops.
		Manor of Abram Trehubov	Садиба Абрама Трегубова	Historic monument	Mariupol	Russian shelling damaged the manor buildings and caused a fire.
		Houses with a spire	Будинки зі шпилями	Historic monument	Mariupol	Twin buildings (1953, Stalinist neoclassicism), damaged by Russian troops.
		Volodymyr Korolenko City Library	Міська бібліотека імені Володимира Короленка	Library	Mariupol	Many books burned along with the buildings as a result of Russian attacks.
		Building of the former Oleksandr Gymnasium	Будівля колишньої Олександрівської гімназії	Historic monument	Mariupol	College of the Industrial Polytechnic (founded 1899 as a gymnasium), destroyed by Russian shelling.
		School No. 1	Школа №1	Historic monument	Kramatorsk	Attacked and severely damaged by Russian occupation forces.
		House of Science and Technology of Railway Workers	Будинок науки і техніки залізничників	Historic monument	Lyman	Building (1929, Constructivism), damaged by Russian shelling.
		St. George's Church	Церква Святого Георгія	Historic monument	Dolyna	Orthodox church of the Moscow Patriarchate severely damaged in a Russian attack.
		Karl Marx Cultural Centre	Палац культури імені Карла Маркса	Museum	Mariupol	During the siege of Mariupol the building was severely damaged.
		Petro Mohyla Church	Церква Петра Могили	Museum	Mariupol	Russian shelling damaged the building decorated with Petrykivka painting, which housed a library, museum, and bandura school.
		Church of the Mother of God Joy of All Who Sorrow	Церква Богородиці «Радість усіх скорботних»	Church	Bohorodychne	Church destroyed by Russian shelling.
		All Saints Skete of Sviatohirsk Lavra	Всіхсвятський скит Святогірської лаври	Church	Sviatohirsk	Orthodox church of the Moscow Patriarchate, destroyed by Russian troops.
		Saint Nicholas Church	Свято-Миколаївська церква	Church	Lyman	Shelling damaged the facade, roof, windows, doors, and interior of the church.
		Church of Theodosius of Chernihiv	Церква святителя Феодосія Чернігівського	Church	Stavky, Horlivka Raion	Orthodox church and Sunday school premises damaged.
		Volodymyr Church (Baptistery)	Володимирська церква (Баптистерій)	Church	Lyman	Annex of the Peter and Paul Church.
		Collegium School No. 1	Колегіум-школа №1	Historic monument	Mariupol	Former women's gymnasium (1894), destroyed by Russian shelling.
		Monastery of the Holy Intercession	Свято-Покровський жіночий монастир	Monastery	Lyman	Several buildings of the Orthodox convent damaged.
		Synagogue	Синагога	Synagogue	Mariupol	Building from the early 20th century damaged by Russian troops.
		House with the Clock	Будинок з годинником	Historic monument	Mariupol	Demolished by Russian occupiers; former atelier of Victor Arnautoff.
		Church of the Victors	Дім молитви «Церкви переможців»	Church	Sloviansk	Protestant prayer house damaged by Russian shelling.
		Music School	Музична школа	Music school	Sviatohirsk	The only music school in the community destroyed by an occupier rocket attack.
		Cultural Centre of the Federation of Greek Communities in Ukraine	Культурний центр Федерації грецьких товариств України	Cultural centre	Mariupol	Building damaged during the siege of Mariupol.
		Maсarius Church	Свято-Макаріївська церква	Church	Toretsk	Orthodox church destroyed by a Russian shell strike.
		Cultural Centre Meotida	Культурний центр «Меотида»	Cultural centre	Mariupol	Building damaged.
		Technological Lyceum	Технологічний ліцей	Historic monument	Mariupol	Architectural monument building from 1936 destroyed.
		Palace of Culture	Палац культури	Historic monument	Bakhmut	Architectural monument (1926) set on fire by a Russian army attack.
		Chapel	Каплиця	Chapel	Bohorodychne	Village destroyed during combat operations.
		Nativity of the Theotokos Church	Церква Різдва Богородиці	Church	Verkhnokamianske	Greek Catholic church damaged by Russian shelling.
		Dormition Monastery of St. Nicholas and St. Basil	Миколо-Василівський монастир	Monastery	Mykilske	Shelling destroyed one of the largest newly founded monasteries in Ukraine.
		Kingdom Hall of Jehovah's Witnesses	Зал Царства Свідків Єгови	Church	Marinka	City completely destroyed.
		Kingdom Hall of Jehovah's Witnesses	Зал Царства Свідків Єгови	Church	Volnovakha	Damaged as a result of combat operations.
		Al-Qadar Mosque	Мечеть «Аль-Кадар»	Mosque	Bakhmut	Mosque attacked by Russian troops.
		Church Haven of Salvation	Церква «Пристань спасіння» ЄХБ	Church	Mariupol	Baptist prayer house damaged by combat operations.
		Kingdom Hall of Jehovah's Witnesses	Зал Царства Свідків Єгови	Church	Mariupol	
		Peter Dick's Steam Mill	Паровий млин Петра Діка	Historic monument	New York	Architectural monument (1903, built by German colonists), damaged by Russian shelling.
		Library	Бібліотека	Library	Chasiv Yar	Destroyed by the Russian army.
		Palace of Culture	Палац культури	Cultural centre	Kostiantynivka	Building housing a humanitarian supply point, destroyed by a Russian missile.
		Palace of Culture	Палац культури	Cultural centre	Marinka	
		Saint Nicholas Church	Свято-Миколаївська церква	Church	Mykilske, Volnovakha Raion	Orthodox church damaged by Russian shelling.
		Bantysh Manor	Садиба Бантишів	Historic monument	Prylisne	Two-storey palace in classicist style (1858), destroyed by Russian troops.
		Music School	Музична школа	School	Marinka	
		Church of Saint George the Victorious	Церква Святого Георгія Переможця	Church	Heorhiivka, Pokrovsk Raion	
		House of Culture	Будинок культури	Cultural centre	New York	Cultural centre (1950), struck by Russian occupiers with a guided bomb.
		Local History Museum	Бахмутський краєзнавчий музей	Museum	Bakhmut	City completely destroyed by Russian troops.
		Church of Our Lady of the Holy Rosary	Церква Богородиці Святого Розарію	Church	Bakhmut	Catholic church shelled by Russian troops.
		Kingdom Hall of Jehovah's Witnesses	Зал Царства Свідків Єгови	Church	Bakhmut	
		Evangelical Christian Baptist Prayer House	Молитовний будинок євангельських християн-баптистів	Church	Bakhmut	Building damaged by combat operations.
		Annunciation Church	Благовіщенська церква	Church	Bakhmut	Church destroyed by repeated Russian troop shelling.
		Palace of Culture	Палац культури	Historic monument	Chasiv Yar	Architectural monument, at the time used as a humanitarian and medical centre, destroyed by Russian troops.
		John Chrysostom Church	Церква Іоанна Златоуста	Church	Bakhmut	Church destroyed.
		Intercession Church	Свято-Покровська церква	Church	Klishchiivka	Church (1841) destroyed by Russian troops.
		Intercession Church	Свято-Покровська церква	Church	Opytne, Bakhmut Raion	
		Transfiguration Church	Спасо-Преображенська церква	Church	Kodema	
		Saint George's Church	Георгіївська церква	Church	Oleksandro-Shultyne	Orthodox church damaged by Russian army shelling.
		People's Museum of City History	Народний музей історії міста	Museum	Avdiivka	City destroyed by Russian combat operations.
		Church of the Miracle of Archangel Michael	Церква Дива Архістратига Михаїла	Church	Novomykhailivka	First reinforced concrete church in the region (1907), damaged by Russian troop combat operations.
		Holy Iveron Monastery	Святий Іверський монастир	Monastery	Pisky	Village completely destroyed by Russian invaders.
		Church of Saint John the Theologian	Церква Святого Іоанна Богослова	Church	Orlivka, Ocheretyne settlement hromada, Pokrovsk Raion	
		House of Culture	Будинок культури	Cultural centre	Orlivka, Ocheretyne settlement hromada, Pokrovsk Raion	
		Monument to the Fallen Workers of the Azovstal Plant	Пам'ятник загиблим працівникам заводу «Азовсталь»	Monument	Mariupol	Damaged by Russian troops during massive shelling.
		Art School	Художня школа	Historic monument	Bakhmut	Former villa of Yakiv Smolensky (1890s), severely damaged during massive Russian troop shelling.
		State Bank Building	Будівля державного банку	Historic monument	Toretsk	Russian troops completely destroyed the city.
		General Education School No. 11	Загальноосвітня школа №11	Historic monument	Bakhmut	110-year-old school building destroyed by Russian troops.
		Bakhmut I railway station	Залізничний вокзал Бахмут I	Historic monument	Bakhmut	Building of the city's first railway station (1878) damaged by Russian occupiers.
		Railway College	Коледж залізничного транспорту	Historic monument	Bakhmut	Former town hall (Zemstvo building) from 1898.
		Former Women's Gymnasium	Колишня жіноча гімназія	Historic monument	Bakhmut	Building (1880s, neoclassicism/neo-Renaissance), destroyed by Russian bombardment.
		Building of the Municipal Centre for Children and Youth	Будинок міського центру дітей та юнацтва	Historic monument	Bakhmut	Architectural monument (late 19th century) destroyed during Russian troop combat operations.
		Choral Synagogue	Хоральна синагога	Historic monument	Bakhmut	Synagogue (19th century) destroyed by Russian troops.
		Pryazovskyi State Technical University	Приазовський державний технічний університет	Historic monument	Mariupol	In 1941 the building served as a Jewish ghetto.
		Nemirovich-Danchenko Museum	Музей Немировича-Данченка	Museum	Neskuchne	House museum of the Russian dramatist and theatre director destroyed by Russian troops.
		Mass Grave of Soviet Soldiers of the Southern Front and Monument to Villagers	Братська могила радянських воїнів Південного фронту та пам'ятник односельчанам	Monument	Pavlivka, Volnovakha Raion	
		Prosecutor's Office	Прокуратура	Historic monument	Bakhmut	Severely damaged by fire and shelling.
		Education Administration Building	Управління освіти	Historic monument	Bakhmut	Building of the second girls' gymnasium (1905) destroyed by Russian combat operations.
		Main railway station	Головний залізничний вокзал	Historic monument	Bakhmut	Building severely damaged during combat operations.
		Mass Grave of Soviet Soldiers and Prisoners of War	Братська могила радянських воїнів та військовополонених	Monument	Pervomaiske, Horlivka Raion	
		All Saints Church	Всіхсвятська церква	Church	Bakhmut	Orthodox church severely damaged during combat operations.
		Centre for Rehabilitation of Children with Organic Nervous System Disorders	Центр реабілітації дітей з органічними захворюваннями нервової системи	Historic monument	Bakhmut	Building damaged by Russian shelling.
		Azov-Don Commercial Bank	Азовсько-Донський торговий банк	Historic monument	Bakhmut	Bank building (1902) caught fire from Russian shelling.
		Railway station	Залізничний вокзал	Historic monument	Kostiantynivka	Architectural monument damaged in a bombing attack.
		Church of the Nativity of the Blessed Virgin Mary	Церква Різдва Пресвятої Богородиці	Church	Novoekonomichne	Orthodox church severely damaged by a Russian bombing attack.
		Ascension Church	Вознесенська церква	Church	Torske	
		City Centre for Culture and Leisure	Міський центр культури та дозвілля	Cultural centre	Kurakhove	Cultural house hosting the Ukrainian Red Cross office, destroyed by Russian shelling.
		Church of Igor of Chernihiv	Церква святого Ігоря Чернігівського	Church	Kostiantynivka	Orthodox church severely damaged by Russian shelling.
		Prokofiev Museum	Музей Прокоф'єва	Museum	Sontsivka	Russian occupiers looted the composer's museum.
		Nativity of the Mother of God Church	Церква Різдва Богородиці	Church	Andriivka, Bakhmut Raion	Wooden church destroyed by Russian shelling.
		Church of Hieromartyrs Clement	Церква священномучеників Климента	Church	Toretsk	Russian army shelled hospital church.
		House of Culture	Будинок культури	Cultural centre	Novohrodivka	Building damaged by Russian attacks on the city's civilian infrastructure.
		Donetskgeologiya	Донецькгеологія	Museum	Bakhmut	Architectural monument; mineral resources exploration facility and mineralogical museum; destroyed by Russian shelling.
		Sts. Peter and Paul Church	Петропавлівська церква	Church	Myrnohrad	Russian occupiers destroyed the Greek Catholic church.
		Sts. Borys and Hlib Church	Церква святих Бориса та Гліба	Church	Chasiv Yar	During the battles of Chasiv Yar the church was completely destroyed.
		St. Demetrius Church	Дмитрівська церква	Church	Zolotyi Kolodiaz	Orthodox church dedicated to St. Demetrius of Rostov; almost completely destroyed by Russian shelling on the feast of the Nativity of John the Baptist.
		Church of the Intercession of the Mother of God	Свято-Покровська церква	Church	Hryshyne	Oldest church in the Pokrovsk Raion (1804); caught fire from Russian shelling.
		Church of the Nativity of the Blessed Virgin	Різдва Пресвятої Богородиці церквa	Church	Zakytne	Orthodox church, burned down due to a Russian drone attack.

== Kharkiv Oblast ==
Damaged sites in Kharkiv Oblast
Photo before	Photo after	Name/Description	In Ukrainian	Type	Populated place	Notes
		Dormition Cathedral	Успенський собор	Cathedral	Kharkiv	Cathedral damaged by Russian shelling; stained glass windows destroyed.
		Kharkiv Court of Appeal	Харківський апеляційний суд	Historic monument	Kharkiv	Building (1902, architect: Oleksii Beketov) damaged by Russian attack; windows shattered, interiors heavily destroyed, roof burned.
		Slovo Building	Будинок «Слово»	Historic monument	Kharkiv	Residents—Ukrainian writers and artists—were executed in 1937 by the NKVD; the building was damaged in 2022 by Russian shelling.
		Kharkiv Art Museum	Харківський художній музей	Museum	Kharkiv	Building (1914, architect: Oleksii Beketov) damaged by Russian shelling; facades, windows, and stained glass destroyed.
		Orthodox Church of Saints Faith, Hope, Love and Sophia	Храм святих Віри, Надії, Любові та Софії	Church	Kamianka	Church (1831); closed in 1919 by the Bolsheviks, destroyed in 1932 during the Soviet period, rebuilt in 2018, and destroyed again by Russia in 2023.
		Church of Saint Queen Tamara	Храм цариці Тамари	Church	Piatykhatky	Church damaged by Russian shelling; windows, doors, walls, and liturgical objects destroyed.
		Kharkiv State Academic Opera and Ballet Theatre named after Mykola Lysenko	ХНАТОБ ім. М. Лисенка	Theatre	Kharkiv	Damaged by Russian bombing.
		Kharkiv Korolenko State Scientific Library	Харківська державна наукова бібліотека ім. В. Г. Короленка	Library	Kharkiv	Scientific library (approx. 7 million items in various languages); damaged by Russian bombing.
		Faculty of Economics Building, VN Karazin Kharkiv National University	Економічний факультет ХНУ ім. Каразіна	University	Kharkiv	Building (1916, architect: Serhii Tymoshenko) almost completely destroyed by Russian missiles.
		Palace of Labour	Палац праці	Historic monument	Kharkiv	Building from the early 20th century damaged by Russian airstrike; facades, windows, and roof affected.
		Church of the Holy Myrrh-Bearing Women	Храм святих жінок-мироносиць	Church	Kharkiv	Church of the Moscow Patriarchate shelled by Russian troops.
		Memorial of Glory	Меморіал Слави	Monument	Kharkiv	Base of the memorial complex dedicated to Soviet soldiers and civilians of World War II damaged by Russian shelling.
		Former "Lux" Department Store Building	Будівля колишнього універмагу «Люкс»	Historic monument	Kharkiv	Architectural monument (1894) destroyed by a Russian missile strike.
		Memorial to the victims of the Drobytsky Yar massacre	Меморіал жертвам Дробицького Яру	Holocaust memorial	Kharkiv	Menorah damaged by artillery shelling by Russian occupying forces.
		Fire station with watchtower	Пожежна частина з вежею	Historic monument	Kharkiv	Fire station (1886) damaged by Russian shelling.
		Former women's gymnasium	Колишня жіноча гімназія	Historic monument	Izium	120-year-old building damaged by shelling by Russian occupying forces.
		School No. 7	Школа № 7	Historic monument	Kharkiv	School building (1907, architect: Borys Kornienko) heavily damaged by Russian missile strikes.
		Building of the Department of Labour and Social Protection of the Izium City Council	Управління праці та соціального захисту населення Ізюмської міської ради	Historic monument	Izium	19th-century building severely damaged by Russian attacks.
		Dermatological and venereological clinic	Шкірно-венерологічний диспансер	Historic monument	Kharkiv	Building (1889, architect: Oleksiy Beketov) damaged by fire after a Russian projectile hit; roof and ceiling fresco “Apotheosis of Apollo” destroyed.
		Nativity of the Blessed Virgin Mary Church	Храм Різдва Пресвятої Богородиці	Church	Derhachi	Orthodox church of the Moscow Patriarchate (1800) attacked by the Russian army.
		Church of the 2000th Anniversary of the Nativity of Christ	Храм 2000-ліття Різдва Христового	Church	Kharkiv	Church (2001) damaged by a Russian projectile; roof, walls, windows, and dome affected.
		Kharkiv State Academic Puppet Theatre named after Viktor Afanasiev	Харківський державний академічний театр ляльок ім. В. А. Афанасьєва	Theatre	Kharkiv	Building (1907, architect: Oleksii Beketov) damaged by Russian shelling.
		Ascension Cathedral	Вознесенський собор	Cathedral	Izium	Church (1826, expanded 1902–1903) damaged by Russian shelling.
		Church of the Exaltation of the Cross	Хрестовоздвиженська церква	Church	Izium	Neoclassical church (1823) damaged by Russian shelling.
		Church of Saint Demetrius of Thessaloniki	Храм святого Димитрія Солунського	Church	Vasyshcheve	Church damaged by a Russian missile strike; dome, windows, doors, and fence affected.
		Railway Workers' Palace of Culture	Палац культури залізничників	Historic monument	Kharkiv	Constructivist architectural monument destroyed by a Russian missile strike.
		Memorial to the Victims of Totalitarianism in Kharkiv	Меморіал жертвам тоталітаризму	Memorial	Kharkiv	Memorial to the victims of the Katyn massacre damaged by Russian occupying forces.
		Kharkiv Regional Palace of Children and Youth	Палац дитячої та юнацької творчості	Historic monument	Kharkiv	Building (1855, former veterinary institute) damaged by a Russian missile strike.
		Church of the Transfiguration	Преображенська церква	Church	Kharkiv	Church (2013) in the Saltivka district damaged by Russian artillery shelling.
		Church of Saint George the Victorious	Храм святого Георгія Побідоносця	Church	Kharkiv	Church windows shattered by shockwave from Russian shelling.
		Church of the Presentation of the Lord	Храм Стрітення Господнього	Church	Lisne	Outer walls damaged by shrapnel as a result of Russian shelling.
		Church of Saint Nicholas the Wonderworker	Храм святого Миколая Чудотворця	Church	Ruska Lozova	Roof and central dome destroyed; windows shattered.
		Museum of the Ukrainian philosopher Hryhorii Skovoroda	Музей Григорія Сковороди	Museum	Skovorodynivka	Museum destroyed by Russian bombing.
		House of Culture	Будинок культури	Cultural centre	Derhachi	Building with a humanitarian aid center destroyed by a Russian missile strike.
		St. Andrew's Church	Андріївська церква	Church	Kharkiv	Church (1889) destroyed by a Russian aerial bomb.
		Dormition Church	Свято-Успенська церква	Church	Korobchyne	Roof damaged by Russian artillery shelling.
		House of Culture	Будинок культури	Cultural centre	Lozova	Building completely destroyed by a direct hit from a Russian missile.
		Pavlov Manor	Садиба Павлова	Historic monument	Kharkiv	Russian missile damaged the roof, ceilings, and walls; portico destroyed.
		Sunnah Mosque	Мечеть «Сунна»	Mosque	Kharkiv	Mosque partially destroyed by Russian BM-27 Uragan rocket fire.
		House of Culture	Будинок культури	Cultural centre	Chuhuiv	Building with a basement where civilians sheltered from Russian shelling destroyed.
		House of Culture	Будинок культури	Cultural centre	Prudianka	Building destroyed by Russian shelling.
		Petro Vasylenko National Technical University of Agriculture	Харківський національний технічний університет сільського господарства ім. П. Василенка	University	Kharkiv	University building destroyed by Russian missiles.
		Music school	Музична школа	School	Izium	School damaged by Russian occupying forces.
		Former real school	Колишнє реальне училище	Historic monument	Izium	Architectural monument (1882) destroyed by bombing by Russian forces.
		Polovtsian stone statues	Половецькі баби	Archaeological site	Izium	Stone statues (11th–13th centuries) on a hill damaged during the capture of Izium by Russian troops.
		Trinity Church	Троїцька церква	Church	Mala Komyshuvakha	Orthodox church destroyed by a Russian missile.
		Saint Nicholas Church	Свято-Миколаївська церква	Church	Kupiansk	Church damaged by Russian occupying forces using multiple rocket launchers.
		Zaliznychnyk House of Culture	Будинок культури «Залізничник»	Cultural centre	Izium	Historic monument completely destroyed by Russian shelling.
		"New Life" Church	Церква «Нове життя»	Church	Izium	Baptist prayer house destroyed by Russian troops.
		Verkhnii Saltiv Historic and Archaeological Museum-Reserve	Історико-археологічний музей-заповідник «Верхній Салтів»	Museum	Kharkiv	Building shelled and destroyed during the retreat of Russian troops.
		Church of the Smolensk Icon of the Mother of God	Храм Смоленської ікони Божої Матері	Church	Kharkiv	Church damaged during shelling of the Kholodna Hora district by Russian occupying forces.
		Local history museum	Краєзнавчий музей	Museum	Kupiansk	Museum director killed during Russian missile strike.
		Kharkiv I. P. Kotliarevsky National University of Arts	Харківський національний університет мистецтв ім. І. П. Котляревського	Historic monument	Kharkiv	Architectural monument heavily damaged by Russian shelling.
		Residential buildings and children’s institutions of the KhTZ	Житлові будинки та дитячі заклади ХТЗ	Historic monument	Kharkiv	Russian missile strike on the KhTZ residential district; numerous casualties.
		Residential building, Heroes of the Heavenly Hundred Square	Житловий будинок, майдан Героїв Небесної Сотні	Historic monument	Kharkiv	Residential building (1860s) destroyed by Russian attack.
		Scientific Library of the University of Agriculture	Наукова бібліотека університету сільського господарства	Historic monument	Kharkiv	Building of the first Realschule (1877) damaged by Russian attack.
		Carriage house (left wing)	Каретний сарай (ліве крило)	Historic monument	Kharkiv	Architectural monument (1886) damaged by Russian shelling.
		Carriage house (right wing)	Каретний сарай (праве крило)	Historic monument	Kharkiv	Architectural monument (1886) damaged by Russian shelling.
		Administrative building of the Ministry of Internal Affairs	Адміністративна будівля МВС	Historic monument	Kharkiv	Architectural monument destroyed by Russian bombing.
		Regional Administration Building	Будівля обласної адміністрації	Historic monument	Kharkiv	Building destroyed by a Russian missile strike.
		Residential building on Chernyshevska Street	Житловий будинок на вул. Чернишевській	Historic monument	Kharkiv	Building heavily damaged by Russian missile strike; roof almost completely burned out.
		Windmill	Вітряк	Historic monument	Cherneshchyna	Destroyed by Russian attack.
		Administrative building	Адміністративна будівля	Historic monument	Vovchansk	Russian troops destroyed the city.
		Local history museum	Краєзнавчий музей	Museum	Vovchansk	Museum, one of the oldest in the region, founded in 1912.
		Church of the Holy Myrrh-Bearing Women	Храм святих жінок-мироносиць	Church	Vovchansk	Orthodox church of the Moscow Patriarchate shelled by Russian troops.
		Oles Dosvitnii Library	Бібліотека ім. Олеся Досвітнього	Library	Vovchansk	Destroyed during Russian offensive.
		House of Culture	Будинок культури	Cultural centre	Vovchansk	Destroyed during Russian offensive.
		Kharkiv Hippodrome	Харківський іподром	Historic monument	Kharkiv	Russian troops damaged the Art Nouveau building: glazing, roof, grandstand, and façades.
		Derzhprom	Держпром	Historic monument	Kharkiv	Constructivist building damaged by a Russian missile.
		National Aerospace University – Kharkiv Aviation Institute	Національний аерокосмічний університет «Харківський авіаційний інститут»	University	Kharkiv	University attacked more than 200 times by Russian troops.
		Literary Museum	Літературний музей	Museum	Kharkiv	Museum damaged by a Russian drone attack; windows shattered, ceilings in some rooms collapsed.
		Regional Organizational and Methodological Center for Culture and Arts	Регіональний організаційно-методичний центр культури і мистецтв	Historic monument	Kharkiv	Residential building of Oleksandr Dovzhenko (former merchant house) damaged by a Russian drone.
		Kharkiv State Academy of Design and Arts	Харківська державна академія дизайну та мистецтв	Historic monument	Kharkiv	Building (1913, Ukrainian Art Nouveau, architect Kostyantyn Zhukov) damaged by Russian troops.
		Former Vasyl Ellan-Blakytny Writers' House	Будинок письменників імені Василя Еллана-Блакитного	Historic monument	Kharkiv	Building damaged by Russian attacks.
		Villa of architect Julius Caune	Особняк архітектора Юліуса Кауне	Historic monument	Kharkiv	Russian missiles damaged Kulykivskyi Descent.
		House of Culture	Будинок культури	Cultural center	Dvorichna	Village repeatedly shelled by Russian forces after liberation from occupation.
		Oleksiivka Fortress	Олексіївська фортеця	Historic monument	Oleksiivka	18th-century fortress; earthworks damaged by Russian shelling.
		Local History Museum	Краєзнавчий музей	Museum	Balakliia	Building damaged by a Russian shell.
		Lyceum No. 2	Ліцей № 2	Historic monument	Vovchansk	Former World War I military hospital built by Austrian POWs; destroyed by repeated Russian attacks.
		Church of the Holy Spirit	Церква Святого Духа	Church	Novoosynove	Church shelled by Russian troops.
		Kharkiv Choral Synagogue	Харківська хоральна синагога	Synagogue	Kharkiv	Windows and facade damaged by the blast wave of a Russian missile.
		Chobotarska Synagogue	Чоботарська синагога	Synagogue	Kharkiv	Former Chobotarska Synagogue (1912, now a yeshiva); roof pierced by a Russian shell.
		National University of Pharmacy	Національний фармацевтичний університет	Historic monument	Kharkiv	Building damaged by a Russian Shahed drone attack.
		Tabachnyk House	Будинок «Табачник»	Historic monument	Kharkiv	A Russian missile strike destroyed large parts of the glazing of the constructivist building, damaged the roof, and caused cracks in the southwestern façade wall.
		Regional Philharmonic	Обласна філармонія	Historic monument	Kharkiv	Damaged by a Russian airstrike.
		Max Helferich Apartment Building	Прибутковий будинок Макса Гельферіха	Historic monument	Kharkiv	Apartment building of the nephew of Max Helfferich (1915, architect: Oleksandr Rzhepishevskyi); façade damaged.
		Brotherhood House	Братський будинок	Historic monument	Kharkiv	Brotherhood house of the Dormition Cathedral (19th century).
		Donets-Zakharzhevsky Manor	Садиба Донців-Захаржевських	Historic monument	Velykyi Burluk	19th-century manor destroyed on 7 April 2026 by a Russian airstrike.

== Kherson Oblast ==
Damaged sites in Kherson Oblast
Photo before	Photo after	Name/Description	In Ukrainian	Type	Populated place	Notes
		Former German Gymnasium	Колишня німецька гімназія	Historic monument	Vysokopillia	School built in 1912 by German colonists damaged by Russian troops.
		Dormition Church	Церква Успіння Пресвятої Богородиці	Church	Beryslav	Orthodox church of the Moscow Patriarchate shelled by Russian troops.
		Dormition Church	Церква Успіння Пресвятої Богородиці	Church	Vysokopillia	Sacred Heart Church built in 1883 by Black Sea Germans from the colony of Kronau; later used by the Moscow Patriarchate.
		Puppet Theatre	Ляльковий театр	Theatre	Kherson	Building damaged by Russian shelling.
		State Archive of Kherson Oblast	Державний архів Херсонської області	Historic monument	Kherson	Russian troops looted archival documents and heavily damaged the building by shelling.
		Polina Raiko Museum	Музей Поліни Райко	Museum	Kherson	Museum destroyed after the Kakhovka dam breach.
		Kherson Regional Library	Херсонська обласна бібліотека	Library	Kherson	Severely damaged by multiple Russian missile strikes; valuable books and documents destroyed.
		St. Catherine's Cathedral	Свято-Катерининський собор	Cathedral	Kherson	Orthodox cathedral damaged by Russian shelling.
		Former "Trudovi Rezervy" Club	Колишній клуб «Трудові резерви»	Cultural center	Kherson	
		Ostap Vyshnia Museum	Музей Остапа Вишні	Museum	Krynky	Museum flooded after the destruction of the Kakhovka Dam.
		House of Culture	Будинок культури	Cultural center	Vysokopillia	Former Lutheran church.
		House of Culture	Будинок культури	Cultural center	Posad-Pokrovske	Building destroyed by Russian occupiers.
		Yuvileinyi Cinema and Concert Hall	Кіно-концертний зал «Ювілейний»	Cultural center	Kherson	Modernist building damaged by Russian missile strikes.
		House of Culture	Будинок культури	Cultural center	Starosillia	
		House of Culture	Будинок культури	Cultural center	Novopetrivka, Vysokopillia settlement hromada, Beryslav Raion	
		House of Culture	Будинок культури	Cultural center	Osokorivka	Village almost completely destroyed by Russian occupiers.
		St. Gregory Monastery	Монастир святого Григорія	Monastery	Chervonyi Maiak	Monastery (known as Taurian Athos) attacked by Russian soldiers.
		German Evangelical Lutheran Church of Sts. Peter and Paul	Німецька євангелічно-лютеранська церква святих Петра і Павла	Church	Zmiivka	Evangelical Lutheran church (built in 1885 by German settlers) set on fire by Russian occupiers in a drone attack.
		Church of the Ascension	Церква Вознесіння Христового	Church	Dniprovske	Severely damaged by Russian troops.
		House of Culture	Будинок культури	Cultural center	Zmiivka	Destroyed by an aerial bomb attack by Russian armed forces.
		Gymnasium	Гімназія	Historic monument	Kherson	Building of the First Kherson Gymnasium damaged by Russian troops.
		Building of the former Dykanska Eye Clinic	Будівля колишньої Диканської очної лікарні	Historic monument	Kherson	
		Music school	Музична школа	Historic monument	Kherson	Building of Mayor Mykola Blashkov repeatedly damaged by Russian troops.
		Alley of Heroes of the Soviet Union	Алея Героїв Радянського Союзу	Monument	Kherson	Steles with names of Red Army soldiers damaged by Russian shelling.
		Suvorov Monument	Пам'ятник Суворову	Monument	Hola Prystan	
		Hydroelectric power plant	Гідроелектростанція	Historic monument	Velyka Oleksandrivka	First hydroelectric plant in southern Ukraine (1926).
		Kakhovka Dam	Каховська ГЕС	Historic monument	Nova Kakhovka	Dam destroyed by explosion.
		Lock with an arch and two towers	Шлюз з аркою і двома вежами	Historic monument	Nova Kakhovka	Dam blown up by Russian occupiers.
		College of the State Maritime Academy	Коледж державної морської академії	Historic monument	Kherson	Building shelled by the Russian army.
		Church of St. Michael the Archangel	Церква Архангела Михаїла	Church	Zmiivka	Heavily damaged by Russian strikes in June and July of 2024.
		Former Palace of Culture of Shipbuilders	Колишній палац культури суднобудівників	Historic monument	Kherson	Building (1860s) destroyed by a Russian drone attack.
		Local history museum	Краєзнавчий музей	Museum	Kherson	Building shelled by Russian troops.
		Kherson Art Museum	Херсонський художній музей	Museum	Kherson	Artworks were looted by Russian troops.
		Church of the Nativity of the Virgin Mary	Церква Різдва Пресвятої Богородиці	Church	Kindiika	Orthodox church repeatedly shelled by Russian troops.
		Chapel of the Holy Martyrs Cyprian and Justina	Каплиця святих мучеників Кипріана і Юстини	Church	Antonivka, Kherson Raion	Greek Catholic chapel completely destroyed by a Russian missile.
		Seventh-day Adventist churches	Церкви адвентистів сьомого дня	Church	Beryslav	Building destroyed by a Russian drone attack.
		Church of John the Baptist	Церква Івана Хрестителя	Church	Bilozerka	Russian artillery shelling damaged the church and killed two people.
		House of Culture	Будинок культури	Cultural center	Tiahynka	Building heavily damaged by Russian shelling of civilian infrastructure.
		Church of the Kasperivka Icon of the Mother of God	Церква Касперівської ікони Божої Матері	Church	Kherson	Orthodox church repeatedly shelled by Russian occupiers.
		Greek Sophia Church	Грецька Софійська церква	Church	Kherson	Oldest church in Kherson (1780) was damaged by Russian shelling; central dome was damaged and the main iconostasis was also damaged.
		Chabad Synagogue	Синагога Хабад	Synagogue	Kherson	Synagogue hit by a Russian missile.
		St. Nicholas Church	Свято-Миколаївська церква	Church	Kizomys	Orthodox church; destroyed by a Russian airstrike.
		Holy Presentation Church	Свято-Введенська церква	Church	Beryslav	Orthodox church built in 1725, originally from the Cossack fortress of Perevolochna; completely destroyed by a Russian drone strike.

== Kyiv ==
Damaged sites in Kyiv
Photo before	Photo after	Name/Description	In Ukrainian	Type	Notes
		Khanenko Museum	Музей мистецтв імені Богдана та Варвари Ханенків	Museum	Blast wave damage from a nearby Russian missile strike; facade and windows destroyed.
		National Museum "Kyiv Art Gallery"	Київська національна картинна галерея	Museum	Russian missile strikes destroyed the majority of the facade windows as well as the glass ceiling of the exhibition halls.
		Palace "Ukraine"	Національний палац мистецтв «Україна»	Concert hall	Windows destroyed by the impact of Russian missiles.
		National Museum of Taras Shevchenko	Національний музей Тараса Шевченка	Museum	Damaged by a Russian missile strike.
		National Museum of Natural History at the National Academy of Sciences of Ukraine	Національний науково-природничий музей України	Museum	Building (architect: Pavlo Alyoshyn) damaged by Russian shelling.
		Taras Shevchenko National University of Kyiv	Національний університет імені Тараса Шевченка	University	Student residence and university building damaged by Russian drone attack.
		Teacher's House	Будинок учителя	Museum	Windows and dome glass destroyed by the blast wave of Russian strikes.
		Mykhailo Boychuk Academy of Decorative and Applied Arts and Design	Київська державна академія декоративно-прикладного мистецтва і дизайну імені Михайла Бойчука	Art academy	Works by students and Mariia Kotliarevska (student of Ivan Padalka) destroyed under the rubble.
		Islamic Cultural Centre	Ісламський культурний центр	Cultural centre	Building of the Islamic Cultural Centre of Muslims of the Autonomous Republic of Crimea damaged by a Russian missile strike.
		Building of the National Writers' Union of Ukraine	Будинок Національної спілки письменників України	Cultural centre	Writers' House (Villa Liebermann) damaged by a Russian drone strike; almost all windows smashed.
		Saint Sophia Cathedral	Софійський собор	Cathedral	Cornice of the central apse of the east facade of the cathedral damaged by Russian shelling.
		Building of the Ministry of Education and Science of Ukraine	Будівля Міністерства освіти і науки України	Historic monument	Administrative building of the Ministry of Education damaged by a Russian attack.
		Great Choral Synagogue	Київська велика хоральна синагога	Synagogue	Synagogue damaged by a Russian drone strike.
		Kyiv Pechersk Lavra	Києво-Печерська лавра	Monastery	Damaged in a Russian attack.
		Government Building	Будинок Кабінету Міністрів України	Historic monument	Damaged by Russian air strikes.
		National Museum of the History of Ukraine in the Second World War	Національний музей історії України у Другій світовій війні	Museum	Windows of the museum at the base of the Mother Ukraine statue destroyed.
		Saint Nicholas Church In Memory of the Victims of Chernobyl	Свято-Миколаївський храм на Татарці	Church	Orthodox church damaged by debris from a Russian ballistic missile.
		Ukrainian National Chernobyl Museum	Національний музей «Чорнобиль»	Museum	The roof of the building caught fire and part of the rear wall of the third hall was destroyed by a Russian missile and drone attack.
		Kyiv Small Opera	Київська мала опера	Theatre	
		Kyiv Municipal Academic Opera and Ballet Theatre for Children and Youth	Київський муніципальний академічний театр опери та балету для дітей та юнацтва	Theatre	
		National Art Museum of Ukraine	Національний художній музей України	Museum	Damaged by Russian air strikes

== Kyiv Oblast ==
Damaged sites in Kyiv Oblast
Photo before	Photo after	Name/Description	In Ukrainian	Type	Populated place	Notes
		Ivankiv Historical and Local History Museum	Іванківський історико-краєзнавчий музей	Museum	Ivankiv	Paintings by Maria Prymachenko rescued; museum building burned down, majority of exhibits destroyed.
		Ascension Church	Вознесенська церква	Church	Bobryk	Destroyed by Russian attacks.
		St. George's Church	Георгіївська церква	Church	Zavorychi	Wooden church built in 1873; hit by Russian artillery and set on fire during the Battle of Kyiv.
		Church of Saints Peter and Paul	Церква Святих Петра і Павла	Church	Bucha	Damaged by the shelling.
		Bible Seminary	Біблійна семінарія	Theological Seminary	Irpin	Used as an aid centre after the Russian invasion; mortar shelling by Russian troops.
		Memorial for the Village Residents Fallen in World War II	Пам'ятник жителям села, які загинули під час Другої світової війни	Monument	Lukianivka, Brovary Raion	Monument of local significance – "Burial site of soldiers of the Soviet Army who fell in 1943 during the liberation of the village of Lukyanivka from the National Socialist occupiers".
		Central House of Culture	Центральний будинок культури	Cultural centre	Irpin	After liberation from Russian occupation, a venue for prominent visits; backdrop for a music video (Ed Sheeran/Antytila) and an open-air concert (Darius Mažintas).
		Resurrection Church	Церква Воскресіння	Church	Rudnytske	Damaged by Russian shelling; windows and ceilings of a building temporarily used as a church.
		Nativity of the Theotokos Church	Церква Різдва Богородиці	Church	Yasnohorodka	Russian shelling damaged the dome, bell tower and rectory of the orthodox church built in 2008.
		Avenue of Heroes of Pryirpinnia	Алея Героїв Приірпіння	Monument	Irpin	Avenue with memorial plaques for those fallen in the Russo-Ukrainian War; opened in 2015 by Patriarch Filaret.
		Bust of Taras Shevchenko	Пам'ятник «Погруддя Тараса Шевченка»	Monument	Borodianka	Established in 1999. Inscription: "Love your Ukraine, love her. In cruel times and in the last difficult moments."
		Church of the Nativity of the Blessed Virgin Mary	Храм Різдва Пресвятої Богородиці	Church	Peremoha	Wooden church (1892) damaged by Russian artillery fire; windows destroyed.
		St. George's Church	Церква Святого Юрія	Church	Irpin	Shelled by Russian troops; in 2024 transferred from the Moscow Patriarchate to the Orthodox Church of Ukraine.
		Convent of the Icon of the Mother of God "Uslyshatelnytsia"	Жіночий монастир на честь ікони Божої Матері «Услишательниця»	Monastery	Fasova	Bell tower (2016) and monastery buildings of an Orthodox institution of the Moscow Patriarchate destroyed by Russian artillery fire.
		Trinity Church	Троїцька церква	Church	Irpin	Facades and windows of the church, consecrated in 1915, damaged by Russian shelling.
		Burial Site for Soldiers and Memorial for Fellow Countrymen Fallen in the Great Patriotic War	Місце поховання солдатів та меморіал співвітчизникам, які загинули у Великій Вітчизняній війні	Monument	Bucha	Monument from 1951 damaged during the Bucha massacre.
		Memorial for Soldiers Fallen in the War in Afghanistan	Пам'ятник воїнам-інтернаціоналістам, які загинули під час війни в Афганістані	Monument	Bucha	Monument with a combat vehicle on a stone pedestal, deliberately targeted in the first days of the war.
		Church of Saints Elijah and Apostle Andrew the First-Called	Церква на честь пророка Іллі та Апостола Андрія	Church	Hostomel	Orthodox church of the Moscow Patriarchate (1997) destroyed by Russian occupiers.
		Local History Museum	Краєзнавчий музей	Museum	Borodianka	Museum damaged by a Russian air strike.
		Irpin Municipal Maksym Rylsky Library	Ірпінська міська бібліотека імені Максима Рильського	Library	Irpin	Roof and windows of the building of the library, founded in 1945, were damaged.
		Taras Shevchenko Palace of Culture	Палац культури імені Тараса Шевченка	Cultural centre	Borodianka	Roof, electricity supply, heating and windows of the palace damaged by the blast wave of Russian bombing.
		Monument to the Holy Archangel Michael	Пам'ятник святому архангелу Михаїлу	Monument	Borodianka	Sculpture from 2015, unveiled on the occasion of the village's 825th anniversary.
		Makariv Public Library	Макарівська публічна бібліотека	Library	Makariv	Library building (early 20th century) damaged.
		Memorial for the Victims of World War II	Меморіал жертвам Другої світової війни	Monument	Irpin	Renewed in 2016.
		Church of John the Baptist	Церква Івана Хрестителя	Church	Moshchun	Facades, windows, interiors and cemetery damaged during Russian occupation.
		Church of the Intercession of the Mother of God	Церква Покрови Пресвятої Богородиці	Church	Lypivka	Church decorated with paintings by Anatoliy Kryvolap and Ihor Stupachenko; served as a refuge during Russian occupation.
		Library	Бібліотека	Library	Pidhaine	Village library destroyed by Russian air strikes.
		Cultural House	Будинок культури	Cultural centre	Petrushky	Severely damaged by the Russian military invasion.
		Ascension Church	Вознесенська церква	Church	Lukianivka, Brovary Raion	Architectural monument of Ukrainian wooden architecture, built in 1879.
		Kingdom Hall of Jehovah's Witnesses	Зал Царства Свідків Єгови	Place of worship	Horenka, Bucha Raion	Roof and facades almost completely destroyed, windows and doors smashed, interiors devastated.
		Kingdom Hall of Jehovah's Witnesses	Зала царств свідків Єгови	Place of worship	Velyka Dymerka	Completely destroyed during the Russian occupation.
		Mass Grave of Soviet Army Soldiers	Братська могила воїнів Радянської Армії	Monument	Irpin	
		Nativity of the Virgin Mary Church	Церква Різдва Пресвятої Богородиці	Church	Irpin	Greek Catholic church damaged by Russian shelling.
		Weaving Museum	Музей ткацтва	Museum	Obukhovychi	Russian occupiers destroyed, misused and looted the museum's exhibits.
		St. Andrew's Church	Церква святого Андрія	Church	Bucha	Russian troops carried out the mass burial of killed civilians on the church grounds.

== Luhansk Oblast ==
Damaged sites in Luhansk Oblast
Photo before	Photo after	Name/Description	In Ukrainian	Type	Populated place	Notes
		St Catherine's Church	Свято-Катериненський храм	Church	Shchastia	Orthodox church (1914) damaged during combat operations.
		Church of the Mother of God Joy of All Who Sorrow	Церква Богородиці «Радість усіх скорботних»	Church	Siverskodonetsk	Hospital church destroyed.
		Islamic Cultural Centre Bismillah	Ісламський культурний центр «Бісміллах»	Mosque	Siverskodonetsk	Mosque destroyed by Russian shelling involving Kadyrov fighters.
		Cathedral of the Nativity of Jesus Christ	Собор Різдва Христового	Cathedral	Siverskodonetsk	Cathedral shelled by Russian troops.
		Tikhvin Church	Свято-Тихвінський храм	Church	Lysychansk	Orthodox church (1999) damaged by a Russian shell.
		Luke of Crimea Church	Церква святителя Луки Кримського	Church	Rubizhne	Church hit by a Russian shell.
		Church of the Three Holy Hierarchs	Церква трьох святителів	Church	Popasna	Orthodox church (2018) damaged during combat operations.
		Railway station	Залізничний вокзал	Historic monument	Popasna	Railway station (1893) damaged by Russian attacks.
		Church of the Pochaiv Icon of the Mother of God	Церква Почаївської ікони Божої Матері	Church	Rubizhne	Orthodox church damaged by the Russian army.
		Palace of Culture Diamant	Палац культури «Діамант»	Cultural centre	Lysychansk	Destroyed by the Russian army.
		Palace of Culture of the Chemists	Палац культури хіміків	Cultural centre	Siverskodonetsk	Damaged during combat operations.
		Luhansk Regional Academic Ukrainian Music and Drama Theatre	Луганський обласний академічний український музично-драматичний театр	Theatre	Siverskodonetsk	Theatre building, in whose basement civilians had sought shelter, destroyed.
		Palace of Culture	Палац культури	Cultural centre	Rubizhne	Building in which civilians sought shelter, bombed by Russian troops.
		State Mining and Industrial College	Державний гірничо-індустріальний коледж	College	Lysychansk	Set on fire by Russian shelling.
		City Library	Міська публічна бібліотека	Library	Siverskodonetsk	Burned down by Russian shelling.
		Prokofiev College of Culture and Arts	Коледж культури і мистецтв імені Сергія Прокоф'єва	College	Siverskodonetsk	College relocated to Kolomyja after destruction.
		Church of Theodosius of Chernihiv	Церква святителя Феодосія Чернігівського	Church	Mykhailivka	Church built in 1905, damaged by shelling.
		Seraphim of Sarov Chapel	Каплиця святого Серафима Саровського	Church	Siverskodonetsk	Completely destroyed.
		Church of the Holy Spirit	Церква Святого Духа	Church	Siverskodonetsk	
		Music school	Музична школа	School	Lysychansk	
		Saint Nicholas Church	Свято-Миколаївська церква	Church	Borivske	Church (built 1873–1882), damaged by Russian shelling.
		Church of the Holy Intercession	Церква Святого Покрову	Church	Kreminna	
		Kingdom Hall of Jehovah's Witnesses	Зал Царства Свідків Єгови	Church	Siverskodonetsk	Prayer house severely damaged by a shell strike.
		Church of Saint Matrona of Moscow	Церква святої Матрони Московської	Church	Rubizhne	Newly built church, damaged by Russian attacks.
		Art School	Художня школа	Cultural centre	Rubizhne	
		Palace of Culture	Палац культури	Cultural centre	Rubizhne	Shelled by the Russian army.
		Prayer House of the Church Christ is the Answer	Молитовний будинок церкви «Христос — відповідь»	Church	Rubizhne	
		Kingdom Hall of Jehovah's Witnesses	Зал Царства Свідків Єгови	Church	Rubizhne	Building damaged by combat operations.
		Palace of Culture	Палац культури	Cultural centre	Siverskodonetsk	
		Chapel in Honour of the Icon of the Mother of God Life-Giving Spring	Каплиця на честь ікони Божої Матері «Животворче Джерело»	Church	Rubizhne	Completely destroyed.
		Second Mytraphaniv Church	Друга Митрофанівська церква	Church	Lysychansk	Orthodox church damaged by Russian missile strikes.
		Trinity Church	Церква Святої Трійці	Church	Troitske	Built in 1815.
		Former Cinema Zhovtnevyi	Колишній кінотеатр «Жовтневий»	Cultural centre	Lysychansk	During massive Russian army attacks on the city, the facade of the 1914 building was partially destroyed.
		St. Elijah Monastery	Іллінський монастир	Monastery	Varvarivka	Monastery, main church built in the mid-19th century, shelled by Russian occupiers.
		Dormition Church	Успенська церква	Church	Hirske	Orthodox church (1797) damaged by Russian shelling.
		Sts. Peter and Paul Church	Петропавлівська церква	Church	Karmasynivka	Orthodox church severely damaged.
		Saint George's Church	Георгіївська церква	Church	Komyshuvakha, Sievierodonetsk Raion	Orthodox church severely damaged.
		Volodymyr Sosiura Palace of Culture	Палац культури імені Володимира Сосюри	Cultural centre	Lysychansk	
		House of Culture	Будинок культури	Cultural centre	Lysychansk	

== Lviv Oblast ==
Damaged sites in Lviv Oblast
Photo before	Photo after	Name/Description	In Ukrainian	Type	Populated place	Notes
		Dormitories of the Lviv Polytechnic National University	Гуртожитки Національного університету «Львівська політехніка»	University	Lviv	Building damaged by a Russian missile strike.
		Lviv National Environmental University	Львівський національний університет природокористування	University	Dubliany	Building damaged by Russian shelling.
		Roman Shukhevych Museum	Музей Романа Шухевича	Museum	Lviv	Museum completely destroyed by a Russian drone strike.
		Ludwik Hirsch House	Будинок Людвіка Гірша	Historic monument	Lviv	Destroyed by a Russian airstrike.
		Ludwik Heller Villa	Вілла Людвіка Геллера	Historic monument	Lviv	Villa "Sonne" (1905) damaged by a Russian drone strike.
		Lyceum No. 5 named after Kokorudz	Ліцей №5 імені Кокорудза	Historic monument	Lviv	Damaged by a heavy Russian missile and drone attack.
		Josefa Franz Villa	Вілла Йозефи Франц	Historic monument	Lviv	Villa (1893) damaged by a Russian attack.
		Residential building	Житловий будинок	Historic monument	Lviv	Yevhen Konovalets Street, 45.
		Bernardine Monastery (St. Andrew’s Church)	Бернардинський монастир (церква святого Андрія)	Historic monument	Lviv	Roof structure of a building near the bell tower set on fire by a drone; windows of St. Andrew’s Church damaged. Part of the Old Town of Lviv (UNESCO World Heritage Site)
		Lontskoho Prison Museum	Музей «Тюрма на Лонцького»	Museum	Lviv	Almost all windows destroyed in a drone attack.

== Mykolaiv Oblast ==
Damaged sites in Mykolaiv Oblast
Photo before	Photo after	Name/Description	In Ukrainian	Type	Populated place	Notes
		Church of the Immaculate Conception of the Blessed Virgin Mary	Костел Непорочного Зачаття Пресвятої Діви Марії	Church	Kyselivka	Destroyed by Russian artillery on Christmas Day.
		Turkish Fountain	Турецький фонтан	Historic monument	Huriivka	18th-century architectural monument, damaged by Russian shelling.
		Palace of Culture	Палац культури	Cultural centre	Ochakiv	Destroyed by Russian shelling.
		Korabelnyi Palace of Culture	Палац культури «Корабельний»	Cultural centre	Mykolaiv	80% of the 1959 building destroyed by a direct Russian missile hit.
		Mykolaiv Academic Drama Theatre	Миколаївський академічний драматичний театр	Theatre	Mykolaiv	Building damaged by a Russian S-300 missile.
		Mykola Arkas Lyceum	Перший український гімназій імені Миколи Аркаса	Historic monument	Mykolaiv	Former Mariinska Gymnasium (1892), severely damaged by Russian shelling.
		Cultural Centre for Folk Art and Artistic Education	Центр народної творчості та художньої освіти	Historic monument	Mykolaiv	Building damaged by Russian shelling.
		Archaeological site	Археологічна пам'ятка	Archaeological site	Katalyne	Archaeological remains of an ancient settlement damaged.
		Building of the former Italian Consulate	Будівля колишнього італійського консульства	Historic monument	Mykolaiv	
		Königsberg Hydropathic Institute	Водолікарня доктора Кенігсберга	Historic monument	Mykolaiv	Hospital built in 1901 in Moorish style, damaged by shelling.

== Odesa Oblast ==
Damaged sites in Odesa Oblast
Photo before	Photo after	Name/Description	In Ukrainian	Type	Populated place	Notes
		Odesa Fine Arts Museum	Національний художній музей Одеси	Museum	Odesa	Severely damaged by the explosion of a Russian missile.
		Odesa Archaeological Museum	Одеський археологічний музей	Museum	Odesa	Damaged by Russian troop shelling.
		Maritimes Museum	Морський музей	Museum	Odesa	Damaged by a Russian attack.
		Museum of Literature	Літературний музей	Museum	Odesa	UNESCO World Heritage city, repeatedly targeted by Russian missiles.
		Saint Nicholas Church	Церква Святого Миколая	Church	Odesa	Damaged by Russian air strikes.
		Transfiguration Cathedral	Спасо-Преображенський кафедральний собор	Cathedral	Odesa	Partially destroyed by Russian air strikes.
		Chishevich house	Будинок Чижевича	Historic monument	Odesa	Neo-Renaissance building destroyed by a Russian missile.
		Solomos house	Будинок Соломоса	Historic monument	Odesa	Building (1910s, modernised English Gothic), destroyed by a massive Russian missile strike.
		Residential building	Житловий будинок	Historic monument	Odesa	House built in 1850, residence of Fyodor Radetsky (1889–1890).
		Pommer House	Будинок Поммера	Historic monument	Odesa	Building (1893–1894, design: Wilhelm Kabiolski), houses the Department of Culture and Arts of the City Administration.
		House of Scientists	Будинок вчених	Historic monument	Odesa	Manor of Count Mikhail Tolstoi.
		Residential building	Житловий будинок	Historic monument	Odesa	The house where Emil Młynarski lived and worked.
		State Music Lyceum named after Petro Stolyarsky	Державний музичний ліцей імені Петра Столярського	Historic monument	Odesa	Severely damaged in a Russian missile strike.
links		Odesa Museum of Western and Eastern Art	Одеський музей західного та східного мистецтва	Museum	Odesa	Damaged multiple times by Russian missile strikes.
		Brzozowski Palace (Shah Palace)	Палац Бжозовського	Historic monument	Odesa	Damaged by a Russian missile strike.
		Maas residential building	Житловий будинок Масса	Historic monument	Odesa	Building (1850), damaged by Russian shelling.
		Mykola Koroni rental house	Прибутковий будинок Миколи Короні	Historic monument	Odesa	
		Jacques Naum's rental house	Прибутковий будинок Жака Наума	Historic monument	Odesa	Neoclassical building (early 20th century), damaged in a Russian missile strike.
		Porro House	Будинок Порро	Historic monument	Odesa	Neo-Baroque building (19th century; architect Demosfen Mazirow), damaged by a Russian missile strike.
		Kovalevsky House	Будинок Ковалевського	Historic monument	Odesa	Building (1846) damaged by Russian shelling.
		Sabludovsky House	Будинок Саблудовського	Historic monument	Odesa	Building (construction began 1890; designs by Paul Klein and Bruno Bauer), sustained damage as a result of a Russian attack.
		Dialigmeno House	Будинок Діалігмено	Historic monument	Odesa	
		House of Zolotarev and Mass	Будинок Золотарьова-Масса	Historic monument	Odesa	
		City Council Building	Будинок міської ради	Historic monument	Odesa	Former Stock Exchange (1837)
		House in Von Deschi's building complex	Будинок у комплексі фон-Деші	Historic monument	Odesa	Damaged as a result of Russian shelling.
		Janusz's Lodging House	Будинок Януша	Historic monument	Odesa	Building (1901) damaged by a Russian attack.
		Gagarin House	Будинок Гагаріна	Historic monument	Odesa	
		Yurievych's revenue house	Прибутковий будинок Юр'євича	Historic monument	Odesa	
		Papudov House	Будинок Папудова	Historic monument	Odesa	
		Vorontsov Palace	Палац Воронцова	Historic monument	Odesa	Palace (1826) damaged by Russian missile strikes.
		Frolov Building	Будинок Фролова	Historic monument	Odesa	
rahmenlos	rahmenlos	Bristol Hotel	Готель «Бристоль»	Hotel	Odesa	Architectural monument (1899, architects: Alexander Bernadazzi and Adolf Minkus).
rahmenlos	rahmenlos	Odesa Philharmonic Theater	Одеська філармонія	Concert hall	Odesa	Building (1898) damaged by Russian bombardment.
		Museum of Foreign Writers in Odesa	Музей «Іноземні письменники в Одесі»	Museum	Odesa	Former Alexander Pushkin Museum, destroyed by Russian forces.
		Former City Administration Building	Колишній будинок міської адміністрації	Historic monument	Odesa	Building (Staroportofrankivska Street) damaged by a massive Russian missile barrage.
		Odesa-Port railway station	Залізнична станція Одеса-Порт	Historic monument	Odesa	Port freight station destroyed by a Russian attack.
		Or-Sameach Synagogue	Велика хоральна синагога	Synagogue	Odesa	Synagogue (19th century) damaged by a Russian bomb.
		Pryvoz Market	Ринок Привоз	Historic monument	Odesa	Market building burned down as a result of a Russian attack.

== Poltava Oblast ==
Damaged sites in Poltava Oblast
Photo before	Photo after	Name/Description	In Ukrainian	Type	Populated place	Notes
		Military hospital	Військовий госпіталь	Historic monument	Kremenchuk	

== Sumy Oblast ==
Damaged sites in Sumy Oblast
Photo before	Photo after	Name/Description	In Ukrainian	Type	Populated place	Notes
		Local History Museum	Охтирський міський краєзнавчий музей	Museum	Okhtyrka	Early 20th-century building, damaged during Russian shelling.
		House of Culture	Будинок культури	Historic monument	Okhtyrka	Built between 1911 and 1914 to mark the 50th anniversary of the abolition of serfdom in the Russian Empire.
		Mansion of the estate manager of Leopold Koenig	Особняк управителя маєтком Леопольда Кеніга	Historic monument	Trostianets	Russian troops burned down the architectural monument while retreating from Trostyanets.
		City administration	Міська адміністрація	Historic monument	Okhtyrka	Destroyed by a russian air bomb.
		Trostianets-Smorodyne railway station	Тростянець-Смородине	Historic monument	Trostianets	Russian troops devastated the railway station.
		Leopold Koenig's estate	Музейно-виставковий центр «Тростянецький»	Historic monument	Trostianets	Building where Pyotr Tchaikovsky composed, damaged by Russian troops.
		Mass grave of Soviet soldiers and Monument	Братська могила радянських солдатів та пам'ятник	Monument	Velyka Pysarivka	Russian troops desecrated the mass grave of Soviet soldiers who had fallen in the Second World War.
		Former shop of the merchant Fedir Kurylo	Колишній магазин купця Федора Курила	Historic monument	Trostianets	Destroyed during the Russian occupation.
		Library	Бібліотека	Library	Soldatske	New village library (opened late 2021), destroyed by a Russian military bomb attack.
		School	Школа	Historic monument	Bilovody	School in the Ukrainian Art Nouveau style, destroyed by Russian troops.
		Institute of Applied Physics of the National Academy of Sciences of Ukraine	Інститут прикладної фізики Національної академії наук України	Historic monument	Sumy	The Sushanov-Sumovsky Estate (1895), damaged by a Russian missile strike.
		Resurrection Cathedral	Воскресенський собор	Cathedral	Sumy	City's oldest stone church attacked by a Russian drone during a service.
		Library of Sumy State University	Бібліотека Сумського державного університету	Library	Sumy	15,000 books were destroyed by a Russian attack.
		Jewish cemetery	Єврейське кладовище	Cemetery	Hlukhiv	Russian army launched missile strikes on the cemetery.
		St Barbara's Church	Церква Святої Варвари	Church	Iskryskivshchyna	Wooden church made of stained oak (1852), damaged by a Russian mortar attack.
		House of Culture	Будинок культури	Cultural centre	Okhtyrka	Former People's House (1911–1914); destroyed by Russian bombardment.
		Holy Theotokos Church	Церква Різдва Богородиці	Church	Seredyna-Buda	Orthodox church 18th century; damaged.
		Transfiguration Church	Преображенська церква	Church	Soldatske	Built 1881–1900.
		Kharytonenko Palace	Палац Харитоненка	Historic monument	Kyianytsia	Built in 1810; destroyed by a Russian strike in April 2026.
		Church of the Nativity of the Mother of God	Церква Різдва Богородиці	Church	Yunakivka	Orthodox church, built in 1806 in the classicist style, destroyed due to Russian shelling.
		St. Nicholas Church	Миколаївська церква	Church	Myropillia	Orthodox church, built in 1885, the central part of the church was destroyed after it was hit by Russian bombs or missiles.

== Vinnytsia Oblast ==
Damaged sites in Vinnytsia Oblast
Photo before	Photo after	Name/Description	In Ukrainian	Type	Populated place	Notes
		House of Officers	Дім офіцерів	Cultural centre	Vinnytsia	Building (architect: Joseph Karakis), destroyed by the Russian missile strike.
		Church of Saint George the Victorious	Церква Святого Георгія Побідоносця	Church	Vinnytsia	Orthodox church severely damaged by a Russian missile strike.
		Residential building	Житловий будинок	Historic monument	Vinnytsia	Building damaged by a Russian missile strike during the EU conference in The Hague on Russian war crimes.

== Zaporizhzhia Oblast ==
Damaged sites in Zaporizhzhia Oblast
Photo before	Photo after	Name/Description	In Ukrainian	Type	Populated place	Notes
		Church of Saint Tikhon of Zadonsk	Церква святого Тихона Задонського	Church	Huliaipole	Church partially destroyed by Russian attacks on civilian infrastructure.
		Popov Manor House	Василівський історико-архітектурний музей-заповідник «Садиба Попова»	Historic monument	Vasylivka	Shelled and looted by Russian troops.
		Zaporizhzhia II railway station	Залізнична станція «Запоріжжя II»	Historic monument	Zaporizhzhia	Historic railway station (1904) in Zaporizhzhia damaged by Russian attacks on civilian targets; the façade, windows and roof have been damaged.
		Mass grave of Soviet soldiers who fell during the Second World War	Масове поховання радянських солдатів, які загинули під час Другої світової війни	Monument	Verbove, Polohy Raion	Historic monument damaged by Russian attacks.
		St. Alexander's Church	Свято-Олександрівська церква	Church	Temyrivka	Church destroyed by Russian military.
		Residential building	Житловий будинок	Historic monument	Zaporizhzhia	Building (1953–54) damaged by a Russian missile strike.
		Culture and Sports Centre	Культурно-спортивний центр	Cultural centre	Huliaipole	Building (1987) destroyed by a Russian missile strike.
		Kingdom Hall of Jehovah’s Witnesses	Зал Царства Свідків Єгови	Church	Huliaipole	Building destroyed by a Russian missile strike.
		House of Culture	Будинок культури	Cultural centre	Mala Tokmachka	Building destroyed in a Russian attack on civilian infrastructure.
		Church of the Archangel Michael	Церква Архангела Михаїла	Church	Komyshuvakha	Orthodox church (1906) destroyed by a Russian missile strike during the Easter Vigil.
		Library	Бібліотека	Library	Novodanylivka, Polohy Raion	Library destroyed by ongoing Russian shelling of the village.
		Mass grave and memorial complex for the fallen soldiers of the Red Army in the Second World War	Масове поховання та меморіальний комплекс на честь загиблих солдатів Червоної Армії під час Другої світової війни	Monument	Huliaipole	The monument was destroyed by Russian attacks on Victory Day.
		Building of the Trading Rows	Будівля Торгових рядів	Historic monument	Orikhiv	19th-century architectural monument, destroyed by a Russian missile strike.
		Building of the city's first inn	Перший в місті трактир	Historic monument	Orikhiv	Architectural monument (1897) destroyed by Russian troops.
		City Administration Building	Будинок міської управи	Historic monument	Orikhiv	Villa von Henrich Janzen (19th century, built by German Mennonites) damaged by Russian shellingt.
		Former girls' gymnasium	Колишня жіноча гімназія	Historic monument	Orikhiv	Historical school building damaged by Russian shelling.
		Church of Our Lady of Protection	Церква Покрови Пресвятої Богородиці	Church	Orikhiv	Orthodox church wiederholt shelled by Russian troops.
		Church of the Holy Trinity	Троїцька церква	Church	Novoprokopivka	Damaged during the Russian occupation.
		St Andrew's Cathedral	Андріївський собор	Cathedral	Zaporizhzhia	Cathedral of the Moscow Patriarchate severely damaged as a result of Russian attacks.
		Taras Shevchenko House of Culture	Будинок культури імені Тараса Шевченка	Cultural centre	Zaporizhzhia	A building used as a humanitarian headquarters for internally displaced persons from Berdiansk was severely damaged by a Russian missile attack.
		Zakharin House	Будинок Захаріна	Historic monument	Zaporizhzhia	The first stone building of the city, dating from 1865.
		Mamai-Hora	Мамай-гора	Archaeological site	Velyka Znamianka	
		Local History Museum	Краєзнавчий музей	Historic monument	Huliaipole	Museum by Russian shelling severely damaged.
		Culture Palace of Energy Workers	Палац культури енергетиків	Cultural centre	Zaporizhzhia	Building damaged by Russian shelling.
		Sts. Peter and St. Paul Church	Церква Святих Петра і Павла	Church	Zaporizhzhia	Church destroyed during rocket attack.
		Synagogue	Синагога	Synagogue	Novozlatopil	Russian troops destroyed the historic synagogue and Jewish school buildings.
		Local History Museum	Краєзнавчий музей	Museum	Melitopol	Scythian gold stolen from the museum and taken to Russia.
		St. Barbara Church	Церква Святої Варвари	Church	Stepnohirsk	
		Protestant Church of Saints Peter and Paul	Протестантська кірха Святих Петра і Павла	Church	Tersianka	Destroyed by Russian shelling.

== Zhytomyr Oblast ==
Damaged sites in Zhytomyr Oblast
Photo before	Photo after	Name/Description	In Ukrainian	Type	Populated place	Notes
		Church of the Nativity of the Theotokos	Церква Різдва Пресвятої Богородиці	Church	Viazivka	Church built in 1862; survived the Second World War; destroyed by a Russian missile strike.
		Intercession of the Holy Virgin Church	Церква Покрови Пресвятої Богородиці	Church	Malyn	Building of the Russian Orthodox Church Outside Russia damaged by Russian troops.
		Kingdom Hall of Jehovah's Witnesses	Зал Царства Свідків Єгови	Church	Ovruch	Windows, doors, gables, the ceiling and walls were damaged by a shell explosion.

== See also ==
- Ukrainian culture during the Russian invasion of Ukraine
