= History of the Jews in Kharkiv =

The history of the Jews in Kharkiv stretches from the 18th century CE to the present, and forms part of the history of the Jews in Ukraine.

== Imperial era ==
The Russian Empire allowed Jewish merchants starting in 1734 to visit Kharkiv to trade. There were no pogroms in Kharkiv during the Tsarist era, which was unusual for major Ukrainian cities.

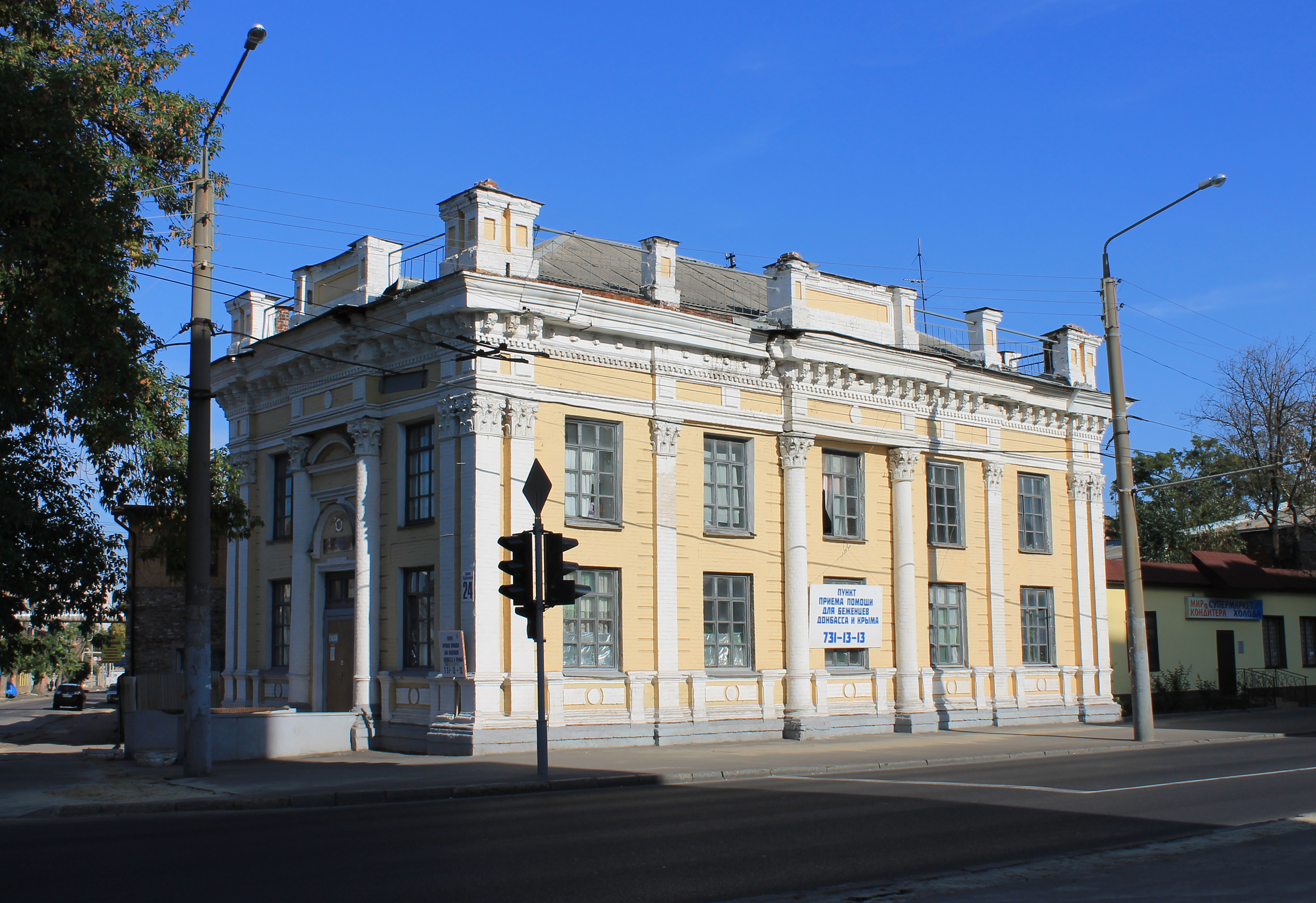
Karaite Kenesa, built 1893

As Kharkiv was located outside of the Pale of Settlement, Jewish residence was restricted by the Imperial Russian government. Jews were not allowed to enter the city from 1821 until 1835, when the governor of the Kharkov Governorate complained about the loss of more than ten million rubles in trade. During the rule of Alexander II, Jews were allowed into the city to trade starting in 1858, and the next year to emigrate from the Pale into the city. The community was permitted to build a synagogue and form a council in 1868. Thousands of Jews would visit the town during fairs. There was a small Crimean Karaites community with their own synagogue and cemetery.

Abraham Goldfaden's theatre troupe performed in the city for a month in 1880. Jews began to attend the University of Kharkiv, and made up just over a quarter of the student body in 1886, and formed a Bilu society led by Israel Belkind. The city soon had three Jewish banks, and many wholesale businesses trading internationally, as well as other tradesmen and craftsmen. A hospital and a soup kitchen were opened. The city had become a prominent center for the Zionist movement in Russia by the late 19th century, and Ber Borochov organized a conference in 1903 opposing the Uganda Plan proposed by the Sixth Zionist Congress.

== Early Soviet era ==
During World War I and the Russian Civil War, many Jews were fled to the city from fighting and pogroms, greatly increasing the Jewish population. Jewish settlement in the Soviet period was mainly in the Kahanovychskyi, Oktiabr’skii, Leninskyi, and Dzerzhynskyi districts. The Kharkiv Kombund, local affiliate of the anti-Zionist General Jewish Labour Bund, had a small presence in the city. A Jewish school was transferred from Grodno. A Hebrew school and university were established, and books and newspapers in Yiddish and Hebrew were published. The city hosted conferences by the Zionist Socialist Workers Party in 1920, HeHalutz in 1920 and 1922, and Hashomer Hatzair in 1923.

As Joseph Stalin consolidated power, Jewish life was repressed. But despite the strong presence of the anti-Zionist Yevsektsiya section of the Communist Party, which printed several Yiddish communist newspapers were printed, including Der Komunist from 1920 to 1922, daily Der Shtern from 1925 to 1941, and Zai Greit! from 1928 to 1937, as well as journals Di Roite Welt and Sovetishe Literatur. There were four Yiddish schools with about 1,900 pupils by the end of the decade. The Ukrainian Jewish State Theater was opened in 1925, until it moved to Kyiv in 1934.

== Holocaust ==
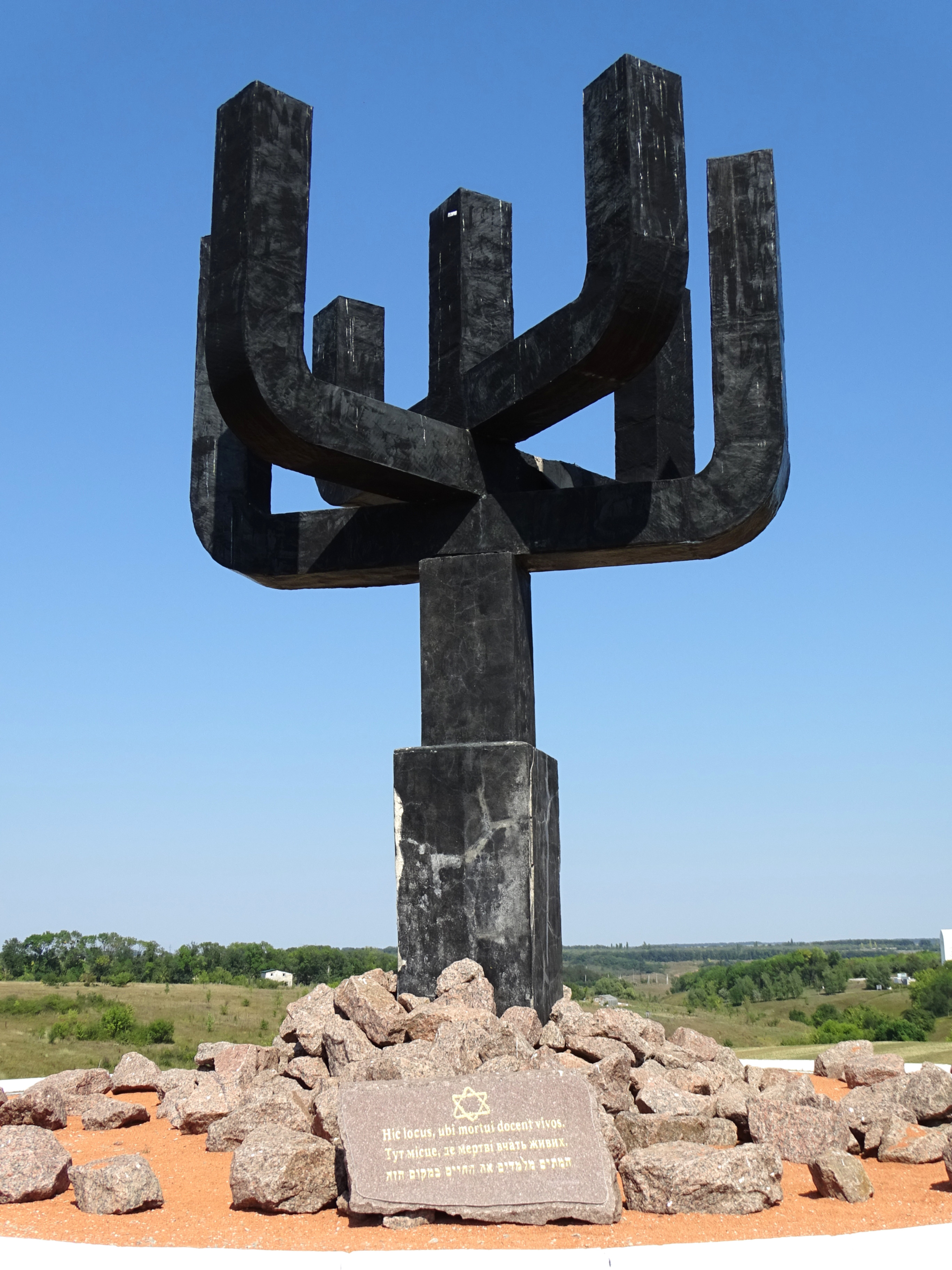
Drobytsky Yar Menorah Memorial, damaged by Russian military in March 2022

During the Holocaust, the 6th Army led by General Walter von Reichenau occupied Kharkiv on October 24, 1941 and enacted martial law. Most of the Jews fled, however the commander ordered the capture of Jews and had many shot. The German headquarters, as well as several buildings in the city center, were blown up a few weeks later on November 14 by time bombs set by the retreating Red Army. Casualties included the commander, Generalleutnant Georg Braun, and staff of the 68th Infantry Division. The Germans then arrested hundreds of civilians, including many Jews, and hanged them from the balconies of large buildings.

The Stadtkommandant ordered the confinement of the Jewish population to a barracks shantytown near the Kharkiv Tractor Plant on December 14, and within two days, 20,000 Jews were gathered there. The barracks had windows, doors, or heating. No food was allowed in and water was limited, causing many to die of disease and starvation. Sonderkommando 4a, commanded by SS Standartenführer Paul Blobel of Einsatzgruppe C, began shooting them in December and continued the killings throughout January using a gas van. This vehicle was modified to hold 50 people and drove around the city, slowly killing those trapped inside with carbon monoxide emitted from the vehicle itself and channeled into an airtight compartment. The victims died from a combination of carbon monoxide poisoning and suffocation. The ghetto was liquidated in early January, and 15,000 Jews were murdered at Drobytsky Yar, along with another 6,685 murdered in the city.

== Later Soviet era ==
The city was liberated by Soviet forces on August 23, 1943, and following World War II, the community saw a renewal. However, Soviet repression of Jewish religion and culture had led to the end of the Jewish theater in 1949, the closure of the last synagogue in 1948–1949 which was turned into a gym. The city rabbi Shmuel Lev was arrested in 1950. Jews were persecuted for trying to celebrate the High Holidays from 1957 to 1959 and Torah scrolls were seized. Services during the 1960s and 1970s were disrupted again and Jews beaten by police, and arrested for baking matzah. There was a Jewish section in the general cemetery in 1970, and kosher poultry was available.

== Post-Soviet era ==
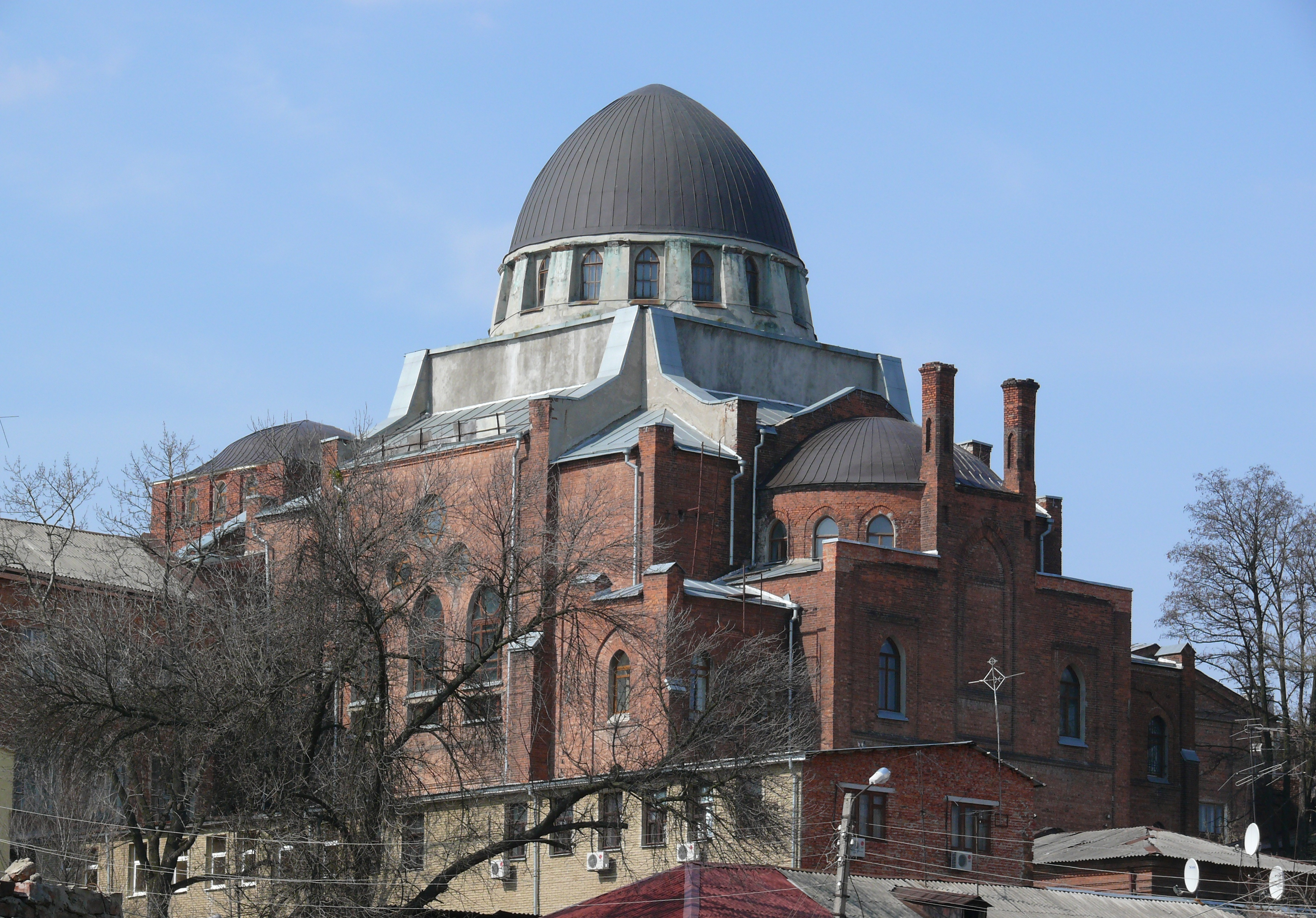
Kharkiv Choral Synagogue

The city began to see a revival of Judaism and Jewish culture during perestroika. The Kharkiv Choral Synagogue, which had been confiscated by the Soviet government at the urging of Jewish Communists, was reopened in 1990. Many Jews from Kharkiv made aliyah to Israel or emigrated to Western countries. The Kharkov Klezmer Band was formed in 1999.

Hesed, a Jewish charitable organization in former Soviet states, launched a program in 2015 to help Jews internally displaced by the War in Donbas who were living in Kharkiv.

== Demographics ==
Jewish population in Kharkiv
Year	Pop.	±%
1878	2,625	—
1897	11,013	+319.5%
1923	65,007	+490.3%
1926	81,138	+24.8%
1933	115,800	+42.7%
1935	115,811	+0.0%
1939	130,250	+12.5%
1959	84,000	−35.5%
1970	62,800	−25.2%
2000	50,000	−20.4%

== Notable Jews from Kharkiv ==
- Polina Bayvel, a British engineer and academic.
- Gary Berkovich, a Soviet and American architect.
- Larisa Bogoraz, a dissident in the Soviet Union.
- Viktor Fainberg, a philologist and prominent figure of the dissident movement in the Soviet Union.
- Oleksandr Feldman, a Ukrainian politician and public figure.
- Roman Ghirshman, a Ukrainian-born French archeologist who specialized in ancient Persia.
- Igor Guberman, a Russian-Israeli writer and poet.
- Yevgeny Komarovsky, a Soviet and Ukrainian pediatrician, doctor of the highest category, writer, and TV presenter.
- Leib Kvitko, a prominent Yiddish poet, an author of well-known children's poems and a member of the Jewish Anti-Fascist Committee (JAC).
- Léo Lania, a journalist, playwright and screenwriter.
- Evsei Liberman, a Soviet economist.
- Boris Lozhkin, a Ukrainian businessperson and philanthropist.
- Yeremey Parnov, a Soviet and Jewish Russian writer and publicist.
- Olga Rapay-Markish, a prominent Ukrainian ceramicist.
- Ida Rubinstein, a Russian dancer, actress, art patron and Belle Époque figure.
- Karina Smirnoff, a Soviet-born American professional ballroom dancer of Ukrainian origins.
- Konstantin Shayne, a Russian-American actor.
- Jura Soyfer, an Austrian political journalist and cabaret writer.
- Nadezhda Volkova, a courier in an underground Komsomol cell during the Second World War.
- Eduard Volodarsky, a Soviet and Russian screenwriter, writer and playwright.
- Yigal Yasinov, a former Israeli politician who served as a member of the Knesset.
- Lazar Zalkind, a Jewish Ukrainian economist and chess problemist.

== Synagogues ==
- Chobotarska Synagogue (17 Chobotarska Street) – Built in 1912, closed by Soviet authorities in 1930, reopened in 2003. It functioned as a Jewish school, but was damaged during the Russian invasion of Ukraine.
- Kharkiv Choral Synagogue (12 Pushkinska Street) – Built in 1913, closed by Soviet authorities in 1923, and used as a worker's club. Later, it was used as a cinema and a sports club. After the fall of the Soviet Union, various Jewish groups competed for control, until a fire damaged it in 1998. Chabad took over in 2003 after renovations, but was damaged again during the Russian invasion of Ukraine.

== See also ==
- History of the Jews in Brody
- History of the Jews in Chernivtsi
- History of the Jews in Kyiv
- History of the Jews in Odesa
- History of the Jews in Russia
- History of the Jews in the Soviet Union
- List of synagogues in Kharkiv
