= Richard Knorre =

Richard Knorre may refer to:

- Richard Knorre (politician) (1900-1964), Sudeten German politician
- Richard Knorre (literary critic) (1905-1947), Soviet German literary critic and newspaper editor
