= Jungsturm =

Jungsturm may refer to:

- Roter Jungsturm, the youth section of the Roter Frontkämpferbund later renamed into Rote Jungfront
- Jungsturm Adolf Hitler, the early youth group of the Nazi Party that was later merged with the Hitler Youth
- Jungsturm (Kharkov), a newspaper in Kharkov

== See also ==
- Sturmabteilung
