= Die Trompete =

Die Trompete ('The Trumpet') was a German language communist children's magazine published from Kharkov, Soviet Ukraine. It carried the slogan 'German periodical for the German children in the Ukraine'. It was published between April 1927 and 1937. It was published by the Central Committee of the Young Communist League of Ukraine, labelled as an 'Organ of the Central Bureau of the Communist Children's Organizations and the Sector for Social Upbringing of the People's Commissariat for Education of Ukraine'. Die Trompete was distributed across all of Ukraine. Richard Knorre was the editor of Die Trompete.

Die Trompete was published semi-monthly. The editorial office was located at Krasnyye Ryady 25-28. Die Trompete was printed at the I. Internat. Gazetno-Zhurnalnaya i Shtempelnaya Fabrika. Issues of the magazine contained four pages. A yearly subscription would cost 3.60 Soviet rubles.

Die Trompete was published from Kiev for a period.

== See also ==
- Zai Greit!
