= Richard Knorre (politician) =

Richard Knorre (20 November 1900 – 28 September 1964) was a Sudeten German politician.

== Biography ==
Knorre was born on 20 November 1900 in Mährisch Ostrau. He worked as a clerk in Rýmařov. Knorre was the leader of the Sudeten German Homeland Front (SdHF) in Rýmařov. He was elected to the Chamber of Deputies in the 1935 Czechoslovak parliamentary election from the Olomouc electoral district, as a candidate of the Sudeten German Party (SdP). In the SdP Knorre belonged to the Aufbruchkreis faction. By late 1937 he was subject to a disciplinary process in the party, in connection with the expulsion of Rudolf Kasper from the party. On 1 November 1938, he became a member of the NSDAP.

As of 1939, he was the kreisobmann of the German Labour Front (DAF) in Landkreis Mährisch Trübau. His career in DAF and NSDAP was cut short. On 13 September 1939, the High Inspection Office of DAF in Berlin issued a decision, stating that Knorre's management of his local DAF organization had been 'negligent'. On 12 November 1939, the Mährisch Trübau District Court issued a warning to Knorre, whereby he would be removed from office in the party for a period of three years.

After World War II Knorre lived in Duisburg and Cologne. He died in Cologne on 28 September 1964.
