= Der Komunist (Kharkov) =

Yiddish newspaper

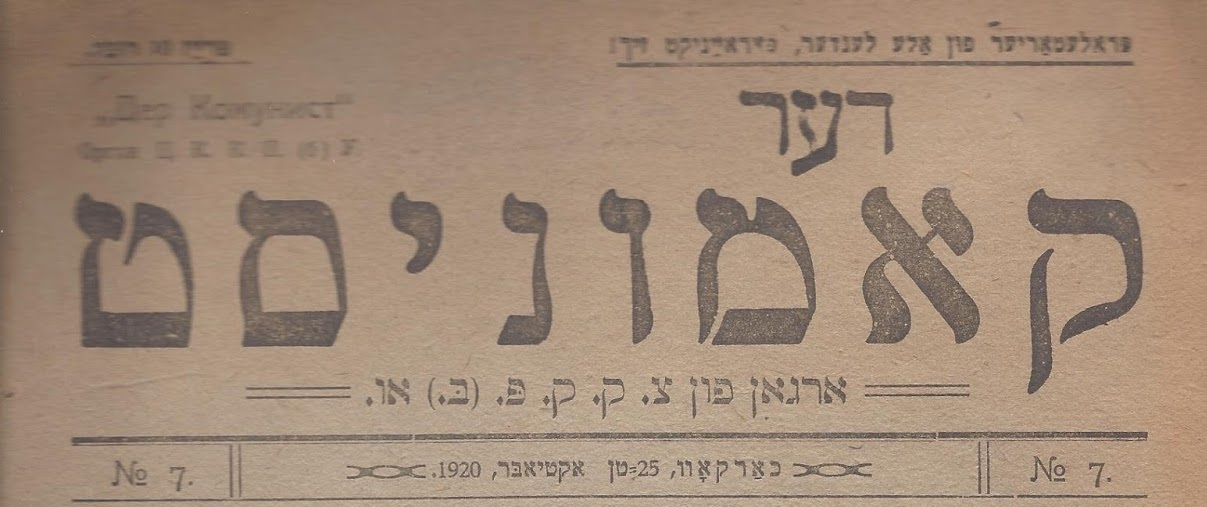
Masthead of Der Komunist

Der Komunist (Yiddish: דער קאמוניסט, lit. ''The Communist'') was a Yiddish language newspaper published from Kharkov, Ukraine 1920–1922. In the midst of the Russian Civil War, Der Komunist was printed on blue wrapping paper (normally used for packing sugar). By March 1921, it was estimated to have had a circulation of 2,000 copies.
