= Novopetrivka, Vysokopillia settlement hromada, Beryslav Raion, Kherson Oblast =

Village in Kherson Oblast, Ukraine

Novopetrivka Новопетрівка
- Village
- Interactive map of Novopetrivka
- Location of Novopetrivka in Kherson Oblast Novopetrivka (Ukraine)
- Coordinates: 47.429444°N 33.468333°E
- Country: Ukraine
- Oblast: Kherson Oblast
- Raion: Beryslav Raion
- Founded: 1887

Area
  - Total: 18.22 km^{2} (7.03 sq mi)
- Elevation: 71 m (233 ft)

Population (2001 census)
  - Total: 832
  - Density: 45.7/km^{2} (118/sq mi)
- Time zone: UTC+2 (EET)
  - Summer (DST): UTC+3 (EEST)
- Postal code: 74040
- Area code: +380 5535

Novopetrivka (Ukrainian: Новопетрівка; Russian: Новопетровка) is a village in Beryslav Raion (district) in Kherson Oblast of southern Ukraine, at about 109.4 kilometres (68.0 mi) northeast by north (NEbN) of the centre of Kherson city. It belongs to Vysokopillia settlement hromada, one of the hromadas of Ukraine.

== Geography ==
The village is 9 km from the district center and 3 km from the nearest railway station, Blakytne. The river Yar Glyboka Kobylnya flows through the village.

== History ==
The village was founded in 1887. It was leased by the landowners, Ogarkov and Petrov. The name of the village comes from the surname of one of the landowners, Petrov. Settlers would often say they were going to "Petrov's land." Unofficially, the village is also known by the name Shahany. This comes from residents of the surrounding village, seeing the movement of the new settlers, would say they have "stepped into Petrov's land." Most of the settlers that came were from Ananiivka (in Odesa oblast). In 1892, the first school was opened in the village. During the Great Patriotic War, the village was occupied by German troops from 18 August 1941 to 10 March 1944.

The settlement came under attack by Russian forces during the Russian invasion of Ukraine in 2022 and was regained by Ukrainian forces by the beginning of October the same year.

== Demographics ==
The settlement had 832 inhabitants in 2001, native language distribution as of the Ukrainian Census of the same year:

- Ukrainian: 96.29%
- Russian: 3.59%
- Moldovan (Romanian): 0.12%

== Monuments ==
There is a monument to those who died during World War II located in the village.
