= Chobotarska Synagogue =

Jewish synagogue in Kharkiv, Ukraine

- Ukrainian: Чоботарська синагога
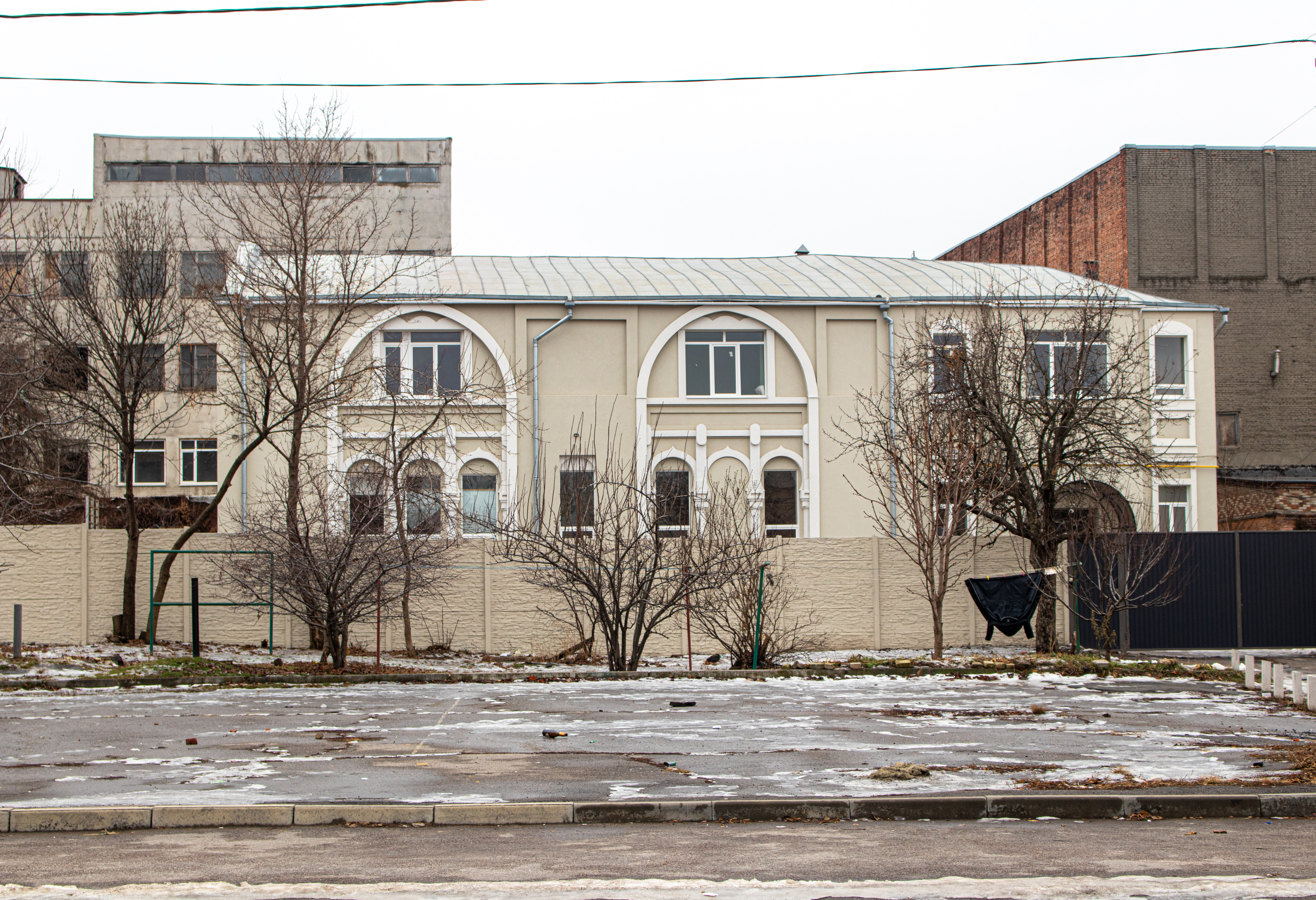
- The synagogue in 2021

- Location in Ukraine

Religion
- Affiliation: Judaism
- Ecclesiastical or organizational status: Synagogue (1912–1930s); Soviet administration (1930s–2000s); Synagogue (since 2003)
- Status: Active

Location
- Location: 17 Chobotarska Street, Kharkiv, Kharkiv Oblast
- Country: Ukraine
- Interactive map of Chobotarska Synagogue
- Coordinates: 49°59′31″N 36°13′10″E

Architecture
- Architect: Boris Isaakovich Gershkovich
- Type: Synagogue architecture
- Completed: 1912

Chobotarska Synagogue is a Jewish synagogue located at 17 Chobotarska Street in the City of Kharkiv, Kharkiv Oblast, Ukraine.

== Description ==
A "Yeshiva Ketana" and a "Yeshiva Gedola" of the Kharkiv Jewish community are located nearby. The synagogue was designed by architect Boris Isaakovich Gershkovich in 1912. The opening took place the following year. The building is made of brick. The synagogue has a yellow facade with triple windows on the ground floor and single windows on the second floor which are framed by white cornices and arches. Chobotarska Synagogue operated from 1912 until the 1930s when it was closed, and the traffic police department was placed instead in the synagogue building by the Soviet authorities.

After Ukraine gained independence, in 2003, the building was returned to its original owners. A Jewish school was opened. On the morning of March 15, 2022, the Yeshiva of the Kharkiv Jewish Community was damaged during a full-scale Russian invasion of Ukraine. A rocket or shrapnel pierced the roof of the building.

== See also ==
- History of the Jews in Kharkiv
- List of synagogues in Kharkiv
- Kharkiv Choral Synagogue
