= Houses with a spire (Mariupol) =

Two buildings in Mariupol, Ukraine

Houses with spire
- Будинки зі шпилем
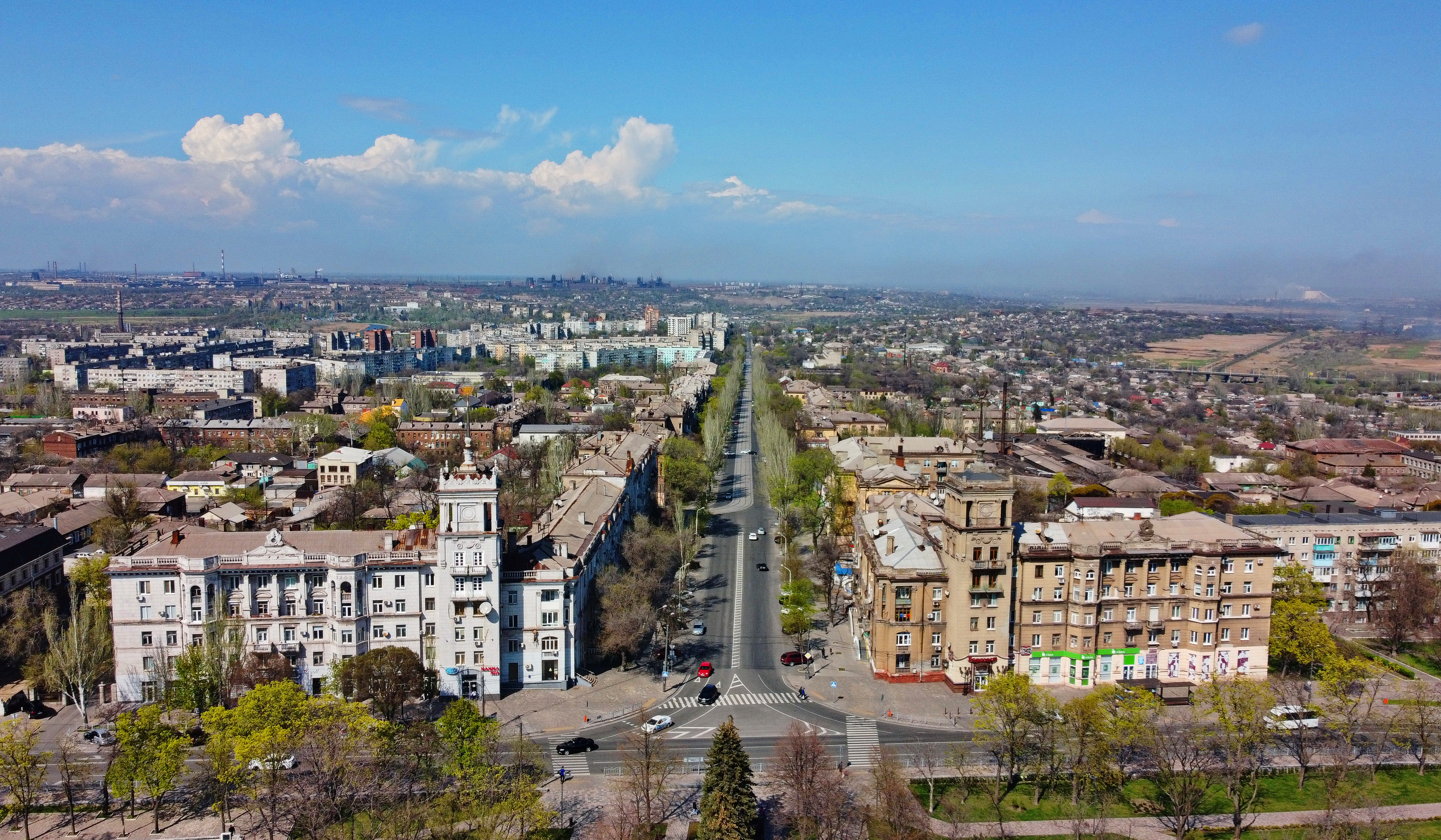
- Aerial view
- Interactive map of the Houses with spire area

General information
- Location: Kuindzhi Street, 35 & 48, Mariupol, Donetsk Oblast, Ukraine, 87500, Mariupol, Ukraine
- Coordinates: 47°05′51″N 37°33′01″E
- Completed: 1954

Design and construction
- Architect: Lev Yanovitsky

The houses with a spire (Ukrainian: Будинки зі шпилем; Russian: Дома со шпилем) are two multi-storey buildings topped with spires that are among the main attractions of the city of Mariupol, Ukraine. They are located opposite of each other at the junction of Kuindzhi Street and Peace Avenue, Mariupol, Donetsk Oblast, Ukraine, and serve as a visual gate, also called "Mariupol twins". Both buildings can be seen even from the Azov Sea.

Overlooking the central square of the city, Theater Square, these symmetrical houses are representatives of the late Stalinist era. They are dominated by seven-storey towers against the background of four and five storey buildings used for residential and commercial purposes.

== History ==
During earlier history, the site of "Mariupol twins" housed the estate of the merchant of the first guild and patron, David Antonovich Kharadjaev, and the building of the City Duma. From the windows you could see the views of Alexander Square and the Church of Mary Magdalene (Mariupol), now the Mariupol Theatre.

David's son, Oleksandr Davydovych Kharadzhayev (1826–1894), supported the first men's secondary school, which opened on January 26. It was housed in one of his two mansions, located on the site where today's western building with spire can be found. The Kharadjaev family lived in the second house (east across the road).

Over time, the buildings failed to satisfy the requirements for a school. Issues included sanitary and hygienic requirements, low lighting and ventilation in classrooms, of which there were not enough, and the use of half of the first floor for a store.

The school was moved to new premises and when the Bolsheviks seized power in eastern Ukraine in 1920, the Kharadzhayev family's twin buildings were expropriated, as was all private property. The eastern building, with a dome over the corner projection and rich classical decoration, was to house the city executive committee of the Communist Party, while the western building was to be occupied by the city council.

During the German occupation of Mariupol (1941–1943), the Chancellery of the German Reich and part of the military department were moved into the building. But, on leaving the city, both houses were set on fire by the Germans.

In 1952, the architect Lev Yanovitsky (1918 - 2008), an employee of the Kharkiv City Construction Project, designed new residential buildings in this place in the style of the so-called "Stalinist empire". The first part was completed in 1954.

During the Soviet era, the houses with spires - the upper floors used for housing of the elite, the lower by commercial businesses - underwent renovations in 1971. In the early 2000s, the western house (no. 48) was overhauled and painted white, so today the buildings have different shades. Repairs to the eastern building were undertaken only in 2011, after part of its facade collapsed.

== Architecture ==
Both of the buildings that are located on the sites today were designed in the tradition of Stalinist architecture of the mid-20th century, a reinterpretation of baroque, classicism, and empire style.

Visually dominating the surrounding area, the buildings are decorated with profiled cornices, the use of balconies on brackets, and parapet balustrades with false baroque pediment.

Other features include pylons and columns of the Ionic order, arched openings, corner parts of the houses decorated with spires and figure parapets.

The towers are crowned by an arch, a fluted portico of the Corinthian order, a stucco panel with a rosette, a crown-parapet bounded by pedestals, garlands at the corners with wreaths with Soviet pentagrams.

== Gallery ==
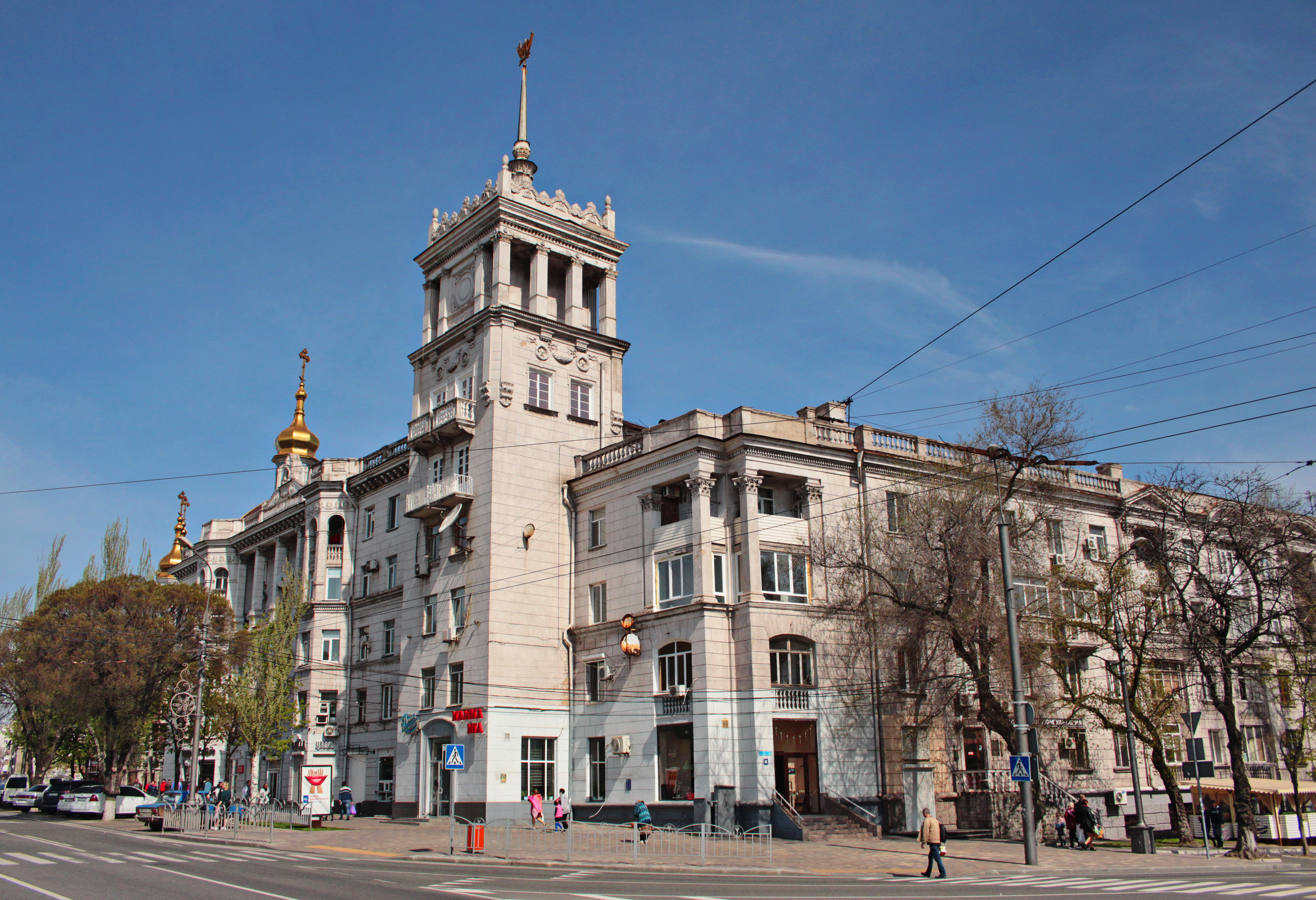
Western building, Kuindzhi Street 48

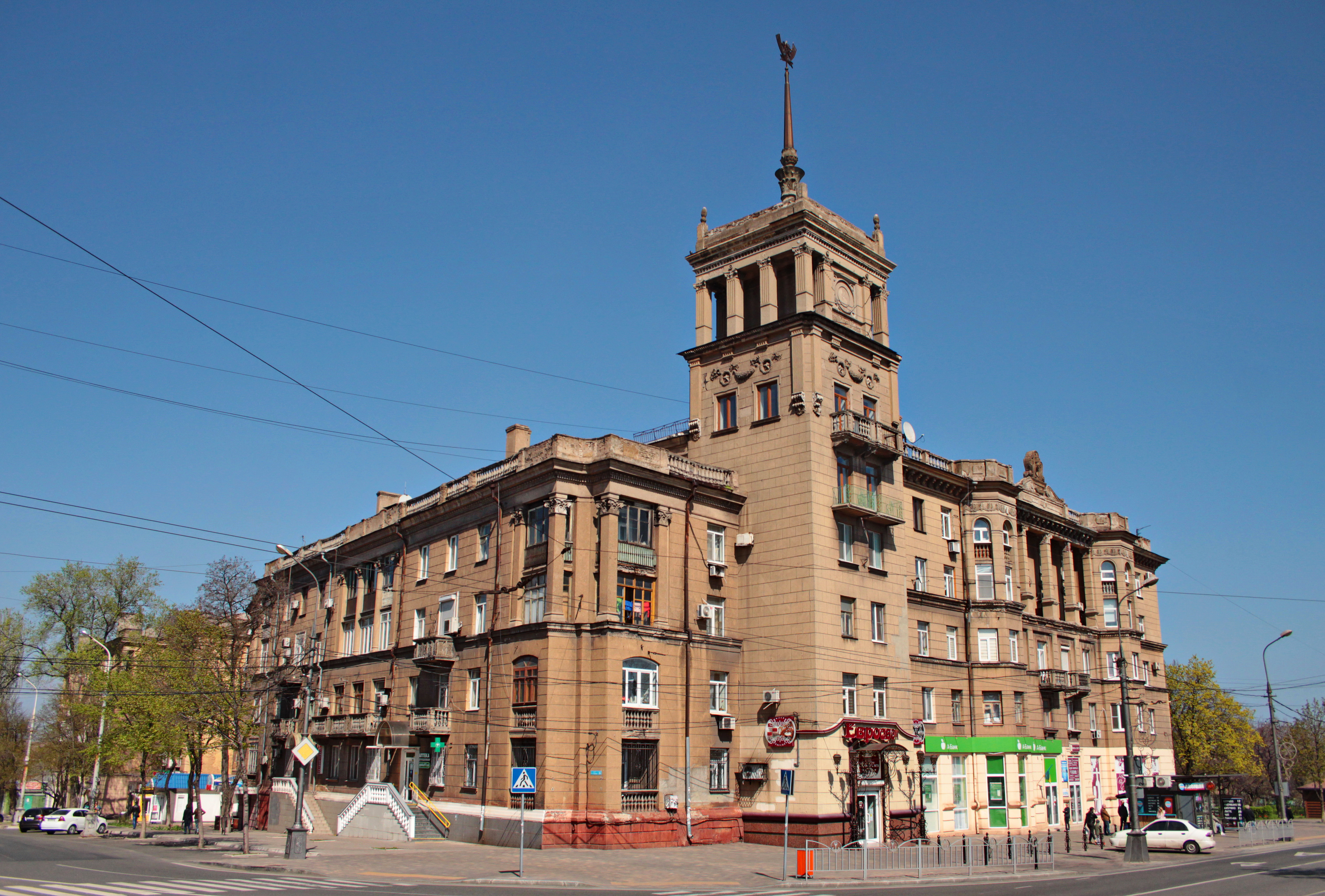
Eastern building, Kuindzhi Street 38

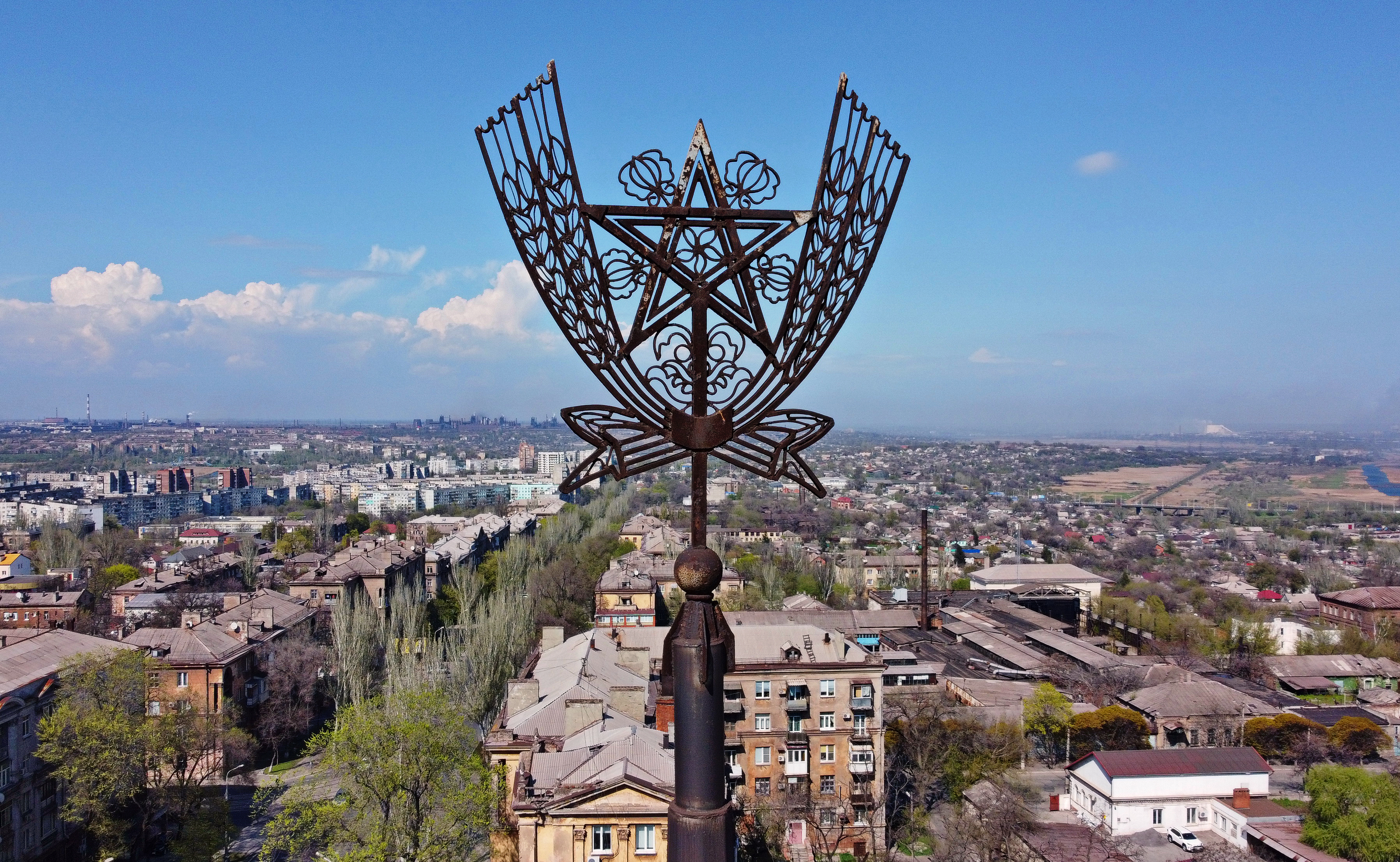
Spire detail
