= Richard Knorre (literary critic) =

Soviet( German journalist (1905–1947)

Richard Knorre (9 April 1905 – 10 April 1947) was a German-born Soviet literary critic and newspaper editor. He was born in Germany but migrated to Soviet Ukraine in his youth, and would play an active role in German-language publishing and literary activities there. His literary career was cut short by the Second World War, and he died shortly after the end of the war.

== Biography ==
Knorre was born on 9 April 1905 in a working-class family in Hanover, Germany. He went to school up to 8th grade.

His political views were strongly affected by the defeat of the 1918 November Revolution. Knorre migrated to Soviet Ukraine in 1923, arriving in Odesa. He became a Soviet citizen. He attended a party school in Odesa, and began contributing to the publications Das Neue Dorf and Der Staat. In Soviet Ukraine, Knorre joined the Communist Party and became a party official. He led the literary criticism section of the Writers' Union. He used the nom de plume 'Richard Wedding'.

He was the editor-in-chief of the Kharkov-based Komsomol organs Jungsturm ('Young Storm') and Die Trompete ('The Trumpet'). Following the decision of the Central Committee of the All-Union Communist Party (Bolsheviks) on 23 April 1932, to create the Union of Soviet Writers, Knorre worked extensively for the preparations for the first congress of the new organization and was a member of the Preparatory Committee for the event. Between March 1932 and April 1933, he worked as editor for Die Sturmschritt, the German language organ of the All Ukrainian Union of Soviet Writers.

Knorre volunteered for front-line duty in the Second World War. He served in the defense in the siege of Leningrad and was wounded in a bomb blast. After recovery he worked as a translator in Moscow. Following the war he moved to Novosibirsk, where he worked as a hall manager. He suffered from physical pain and psychological trauma from the war. Knorre committed suicide on 10 April 1947.
