= Jungsturm (Kharkov) =

- Type: Twice-weekly newspaper
- Owner: Central Committee of the Leninist Young Communist League of Ukraine
- Editor: Richard Knorre
- Language: German
- Headquarters: Kharkov, Ukrainian Soviet Socialist Republic
- Circulation: 2,500 (January 1928); 3,600 (January 1929); 4,250 (January 1930)

Jungsturm ('Young Storm') was a German language newspaper published from Kharkov, Ukrainian Soviet Socialist Republic. It was an organ of the Central Committee of the Leninist Young Communist League of Ukraine, and carried the by-line 'All-Ukraine German Youth Newspaper'. Jungsturm was published 1925–1936. It was published twice weekly.

As of January 1928, Jungsturm had a circulation of 2,500 copies, by January 1929 3,600 and by January 1930 the publication had a circulation of 4,250 copies. As of 1936, the editor of Jungsturm was Richard Knorre.
