= Kharkiv Choral Synagogue =

Orthodox synagogue in Kharkiv, Ukraine

- Ukrainian: Харківська хоральна синагога
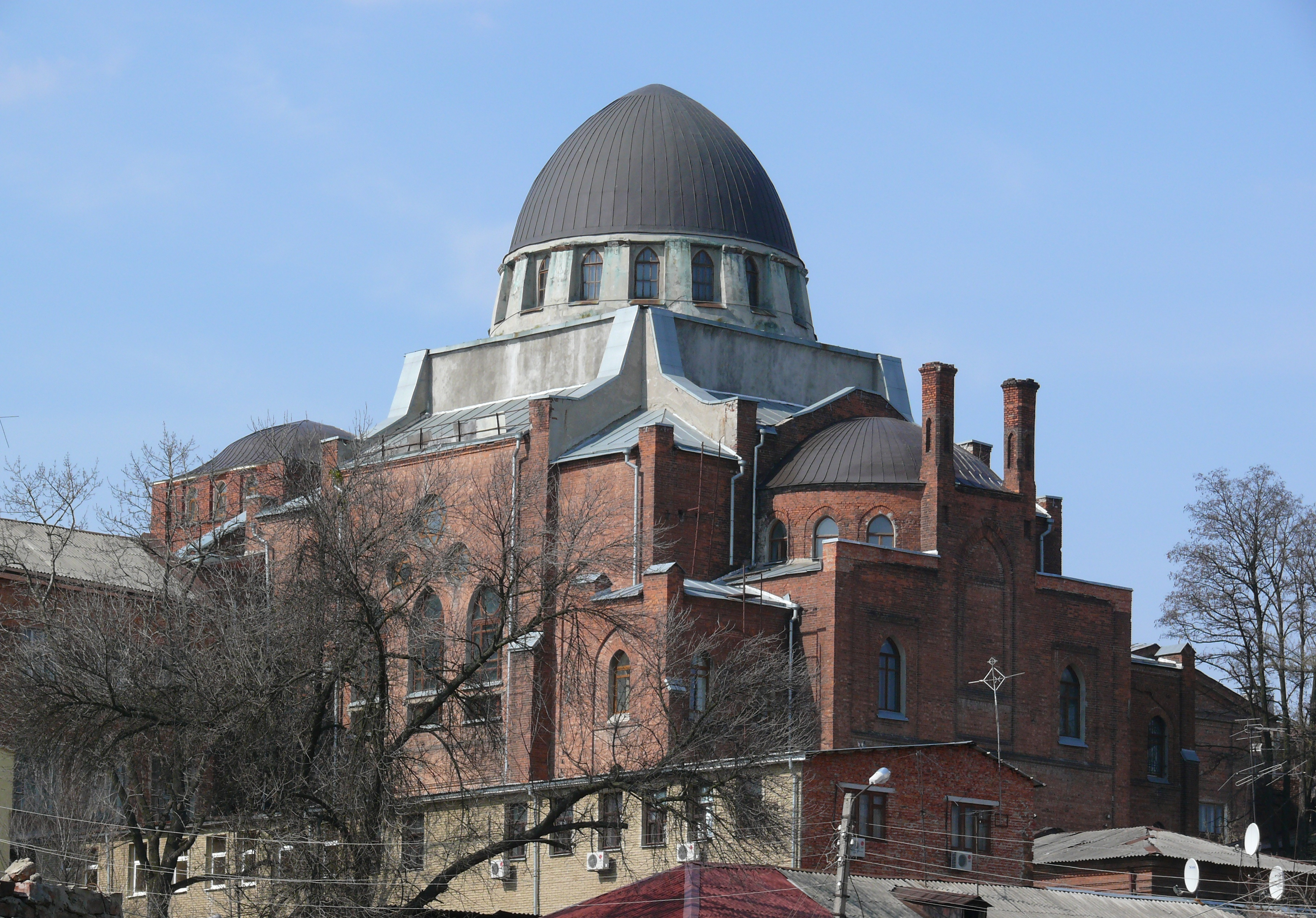
- The synagogue in 2008

- Location of the synagogue in Ukraine

Religion
- Affiliation: Orthodox Judaism
- Rite: Chabad
- Ecclesiastical or organisational status: Synagogue (1913–1923); Communal use (1923–1980); Synagogue (since 1980)
- Leadership: Moshe Moskovitz
- Status: Active

Location
- Location: 12 Pushkinska Street, Kharkiv, Kharkiv Oblast 61057
- Country: Ukraine
- Coordinates: 49°59′32.78″N 36°14′5.51″E

Architecture
- Architects: Yakov Gevirts (1913); Mikhail Piskunov (1913); Vladimir Novgorodov (2003)
- Type: Synagogue architecture
- Style: Romano-Gothic; Gothic Revival; Moorish Revival
- Groundbreaking: 1909
- Completed: 1913; 2003 (renovations)
- Construction cost: Rbl 150,000

Specifications
- Length: 50 m (160 ft)
- Interior area: 2,067 m^{2} (22,250 sq ft)
- Height (max): 42 m (138 ft)
- Dome: One
- Materials: Brick

Website
- www.jewishkharkov.org

Immovable Monument of Local Significance of Ukraine
- Official name: «Синагога» (Synagogue)
- Type: Urban Planning, Architecture
- Reference no.: 7324-Ха

The Kharkiv Choral Synagogue (Ukrainian: Харківська хоральна синагога, romanized: Kharkivska khoralna synahoha) is an Orthodox Jewish synagogue, located at 12 Pushkinska Street, Kharkiv, in the Kharkiv Oblast of Ukraine. The architectural style is described as a combination of Romano-Gothic, Gothic Revival, and Moorish Revival. One of the largest synagogues in Ukraine, the building is 42 metres (138 ft) tall at the dome and 50 metres (160 ft) long, with a total area of 2,067 square metres (22,250 sq ft). Chabad currently owns the synagogue and holds regular services there.

== History ==
The synagogue is located on the site of a former Jewish prayer house which was originally built in 1867. A building design competition for the synagogue was launched under the auspices of the St. Petersburg Imperial Society of Architects. From a selection of seventeen entrants, St. Petersburg architect Yakov Gevirts had the winning design. The competition jury wrote of Gevirtz's designs: "The entire structure is a serene and beautifully accomplished mass, which is not without poetical interest. The author's imagination produced a dazzling remainder of large wall spans of the ancient edifices in Palestine."

=== Construction ===
Construction began in 1909, supervised by local architect, Mikhail Piskunov, and was completed in 1913 at a cost of 150,000 Russian rubles. It is set back from the street to conform with local laws requiring a certain distance from churches and other houses of worship.

=== Soviet Union ===
The synagogue was closed in June 1923 and nationalized by the government. It was then used by a Jewish workers club, part of the Comintern. The local Yevsektsiya declared the day a holiday, and a march to the synagogue was organized, with a group of Jewish workers carrying a red flag into the building. Moscow's Der Emes declared the synagogue a "counterrevolutionary nest" and claimed that Torah scrolls in the synagogue had been dedicated to the Tsar. The building then served a variety of uses: a club, cinema, and a sport complex.

Following the collapse of the Soviet Union, various Jewish groups struggled for control of the synagogue. Edward Khodos created an organization to represent the members of Reform Judaism, and asserted control of the synagogue. Representatives of Chabad made competing claims, and for a period both groups operated in the building. Khodos operated on the synagogue's second floor in 1993, where according to reports, he conducted his antiques business and set up a Friday night kick-boxing club for local children.

== Current operation ==
A fire gutted the synagogue in 1998, and it was fully turned over to Chabad. Extensive renovations were completed in 2003.

The synagogue is a center for Jewish life in Kharkiv and an important city landmark. Jewish holidays are celebrated at the synagogue by Jews and non-Jews alike. A Hanukkah celebration drew MP Petro Yushchenko, then-governor Arsen Avakov, and national media coverage. Other events include a tribute for Kharkiv's Jewish World War II veterans. Kharkiv Mayor Hennadiy Kernes attended a Purim celebration and the wedding of rabbi's daughter.

The synagogue is currently run by Chabad, which has its Kharkiv headquarters there and also maintains a mikveh, yeshiva, and other facilities, including a school of 500 Jewish children in grades 1-11 and a kindergarten of 70 children. The synagogue's current Rabbi, Moshe Moskovitz, is also the chief rabbi of Kharkiv.

The synagogue was partially damaged in March 2022 by Russian bombing during the Russian invasion of Ukraine.

== See also ==
- Chobotarska Synagogue
- History of the Jews in Kharkiv
- List of synagogues in Kharkiv
