= Zai Greit! =

Soviet-era Yiddish language news publication

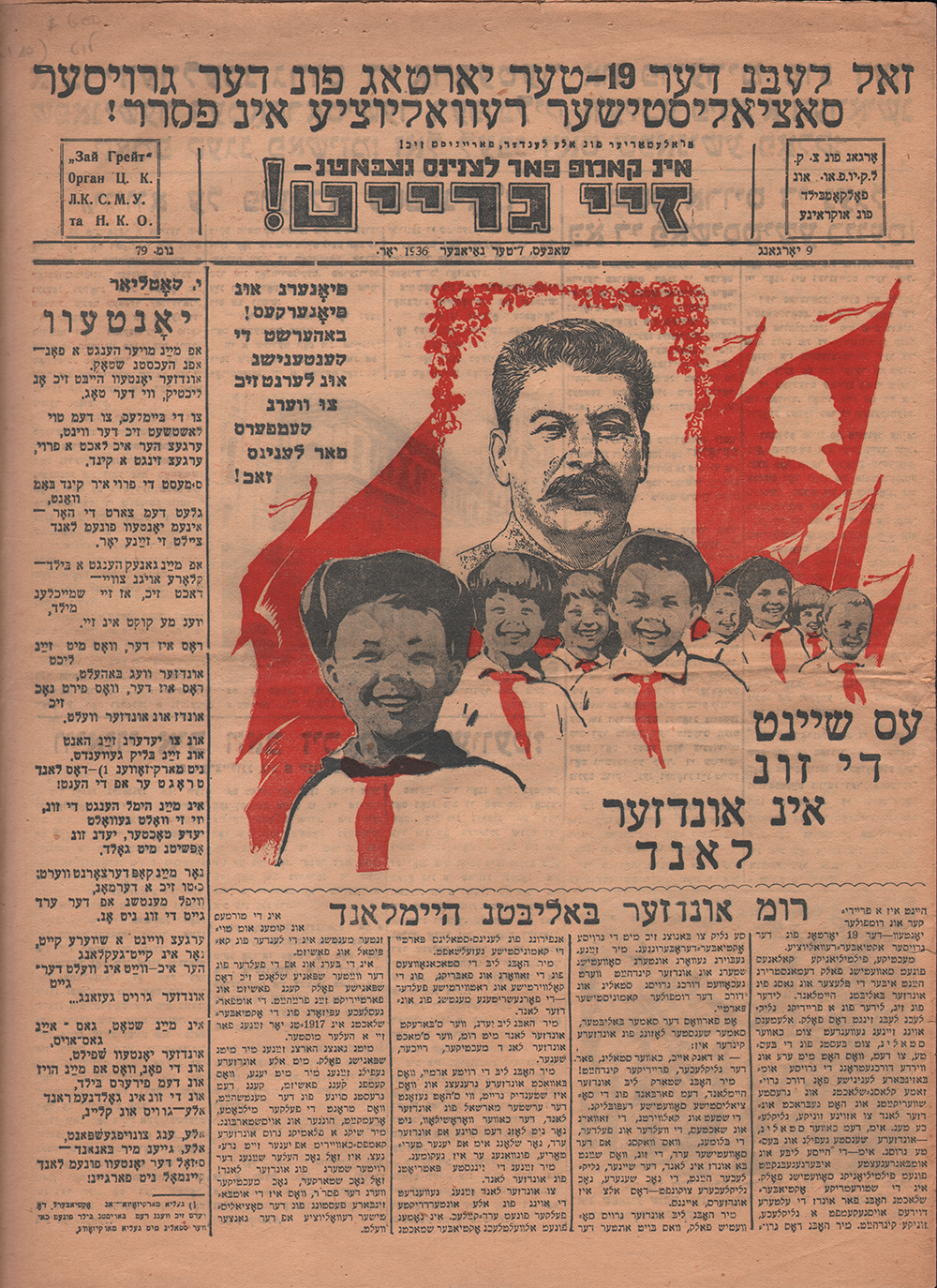
Zai Greit!, issue 34, 1937

Zai Greit! (Yiddish: !זיי גרייט, lit. ''Ready!'') was a Yiddish language pioneer newspaper in the Ukrainian Soviet Socialist Republic 1928–1941. It was an organ of the Central Committee of the Leninist Young Communist League of Ukraine and the People's Commissariat for Education of the Ukrainian SSR. It was published from Kharkov 1928–1937.

As of January 1928, Zai Greit! had a circulation of 10,000 copies, by January 1929 19,000 and by January 1930 the publication had a circulation of 29,500 copies, the highest among all national minority language publications in the Ukrainian SSR. During the 1930 Second All-Ukrainian Meeting on Working with National Minorities, held in 1930, participants noted that Zai Greit! was the sole national minority publication in the Ukrainian SSR with a satisfactory circulation.

Zai Greit! was published from Kiev 1939–1941; with 7 issues in 1939, 12 in 1940 and 6 in 1941.
