= Averbakh =

Averbakh is a Russian-language surname of Yiddish origin, a variant of "Auerbach". People with that name include:

- Ilya Averbakh (1934–1986), Soviet film director
- Leopold Averbakh (1903–1937), Soviet communist literary critic
- Mikhail Averbakh (1872–1944), Russian and Soviet ophthalmologist
- Yuri Averbakh (1922–2022), Soviet and Russian chess player and author

== See also ==
- Averbuch
