= Jakob Glanzer Shul =

Former synagogue in Lviv, Ukraine

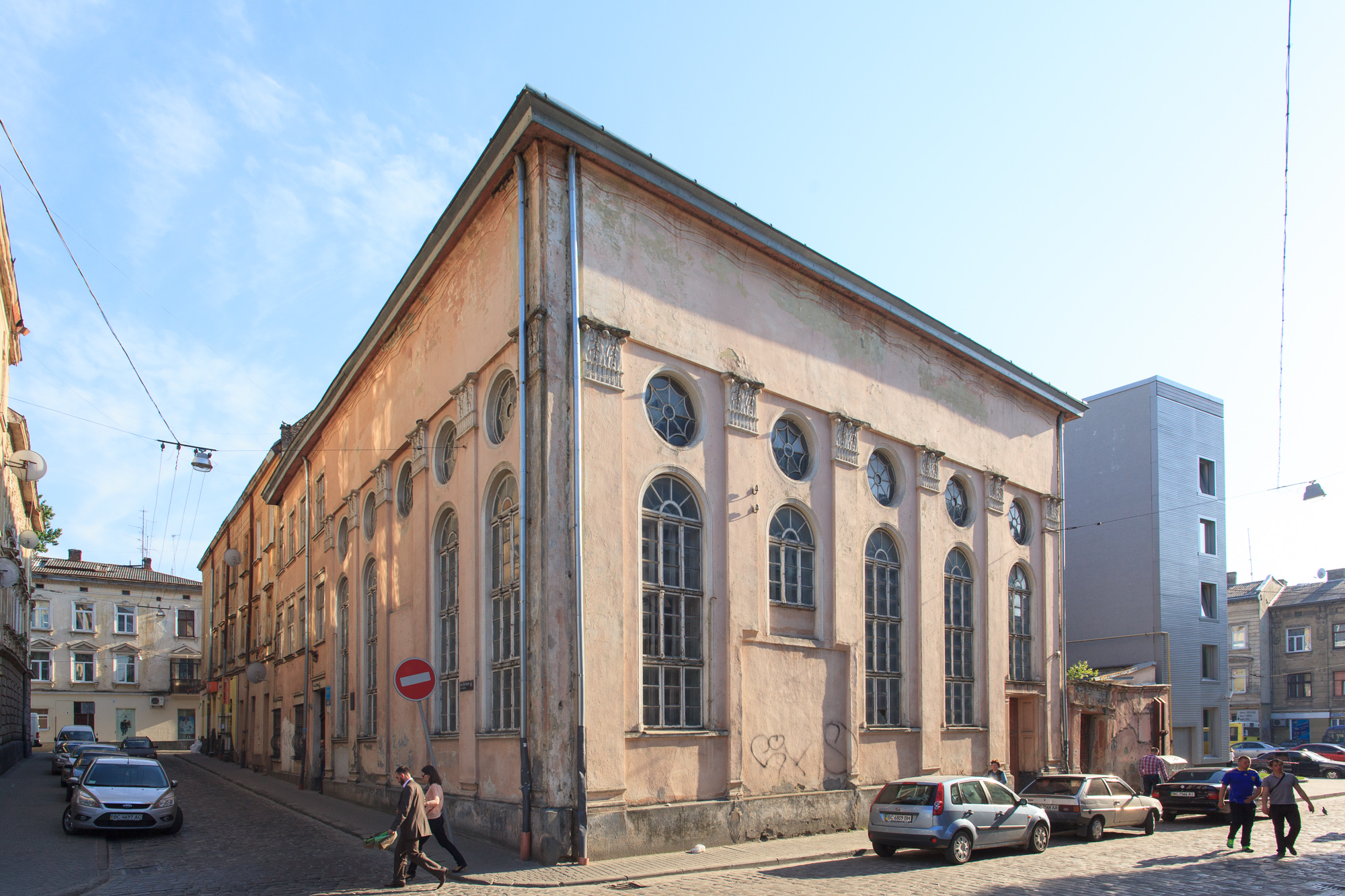
- The former synagogue, in 2015

- Location of the former synagogue in Ukraine

Religion
- Affiliation: Orthodox Judaism (former)
- Rite: Hasidic Judaism
- Ecclesiastical or organizational status: Synagogue (1844–1962); Jewish museum (since 1995)
- Ownership: Sholom Aleichem Jewish Culture Society

Location
- Location: Vuhilna Street, Lviv 79000
- Country: Ukraine
- Interactive map of Jakob Glanzer Shul
- Coordinates: 49°50′44″N 24°01′37″E

Architecture
- Architects: Józef Engel (1844); Maurycy Silberstein (1888); Volodymyr Pidhorodetskyi (1912); Henryk Orlean (1920)
- Type: Synagogue architecture
- Style: Baroque Revival
- Funded by: Jakob Glanzer
- Established: 1840 (as a congregation)
- Completed: 1844
- Direction of façade: East

The Jakob Glanzer Shul, (Note: Also written as Jankel Jancer Schul.) also called the Chasidim Synagogue, is a former Orthodox Hasidic Jewish synagogue, located at Vuhil'na (Coal) Street Nr.3 in Lviv, Ukraine. The building operated as a synagogue from 1844 until 1962; had various uses during World War II and Soviet occupation; before being preserved as a Jewish history museum and cultural center since 1995.

== History ==
=== Synagogue ===
The synagogue was built from 1841 to 1844 in a Baroque Revival style, in what was then the Kingdom of Galicia and Lodomeria, in the Austrian Empire. Its construction was financed by Jacob (Note: Also written as Jakub.) Glanzer, a Lviv merchant, and was named in his honor". After the Great City Synagogue, it was the second-largest synagogue in Lviv. Despite being completed in 1844, the synagogue was not opened until 1846 due to disputes between Progressive and Hasidic Jews. In addition to funding the construction of the Hasidic synagogue, Glanzer donated funds towards the Progressive Tempel Synagogue in order to keep peace.

The building was decorated with round windows, made on elongated semicircular axes; they lit a large prayer hall and the second tiers of the women's galleries. The synagogue building occupies two parcels in the block’s housing. In its northern part, there is a prayer hall; the synagogue premises are located in the southern part. In the prayer hall interior, two tiers of the southern women's galleries have survived.

During the German occupation the building was used as a commercial warehouse. Temple Synagogue was destroyed in 1941. After the war, when Lviv was occupied by Soviet troops, the Jewish community rallied around the Glanzer synagogue as the only surviving synagogue in that part of Lviv. Despite Soviet occupation, in 1954 the Jewish community gained permission for the arrangement of the ritual mikvah bath in the synagogue. The Soviets transformed the building into a gymnasium in 1960.

Rabbi Yaakov Gur-Aryeh served as spiritual leader from the end of World War II until his death in the early 1960s. At that time, the Soviets closed the synagogue took literally everything and removed all the Sifrei Torah. The Jewish community members were accused of speculation of currency and gold. In 1962, after a show trial of the "speculators," the Jewish community was denied the right to have the synagogue, whose building was handed over to the sports department of the Lviv Institute of Printing. (Note: Also called the Polygraphic Institute.)

During its use as a synagogue, the building was altered several times from its initial designs by Józef Engel. The entrance to the women’s gallery was redesigned by Maurycy Silberstein in 1888; the synagogue and the Talmud Torah school underwent a substantial reconstruction by Volodymyr Pidhorodetskyi in 1912; and in 1920, following the 1918 pogroms, much of the synagogue's stylistic features were simplified by Henryk Orlean.

=== Gymnasium ===
The main prayer hall was converted to a sports hall; the western two tiers of galleries for women were dismantled; the murals on the walls and ceiling were over painted; the Aron Kodesh was dismantled; and the and Torah niche in the eastern wall was bricked up. The temple's property was distributed among Lviv museums.

=== Jewish cultural center ===
Restoration began in 1989 to preserve the synagogue as a Jewish cultural center, under the auspices of the Sholom Aleichem Jewish Culture Society. External walls of a building were repaired in 1990. In 2012, previously unknown paintings on the wall were discovered. As of September 2020, the sanctuary had been empty for some period of time and the building was in poor condition.

== See also ==
- History of the Jews in Ukraine
- List of synagogues in Ukraine
