= Choral Synagogue (Drohobych) =

Synagogue in Drohobych, Ukraine

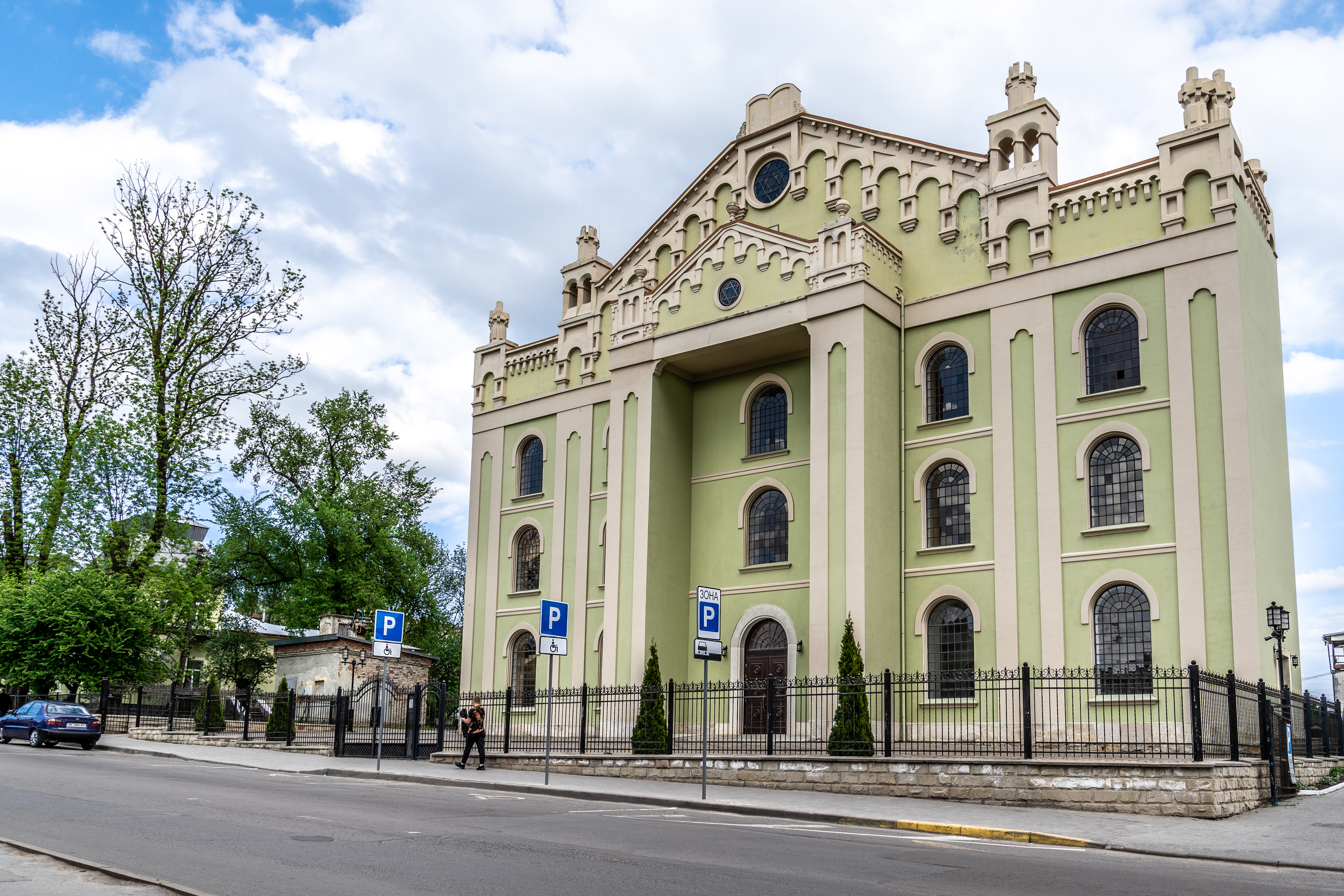
- The renovated synagogue in 2021

- Location in Ukraine

Religion
- Affiliation: Orthodox Judaism
- Rite: Nusach Ashkenaz
- Ecclesiastical or organizational status: Synagogue
- Status: Active

Location
- Location: Pylypa Orlyka Street, Drohobych, Lviv Oblast 82100
- Country: Ukraine
- Interactive map of Choral Synagogue
- Coordinates: 49°21′12″N 23°30′41″E

Architecture
- Type: Synagogue architecture
- Style: Rundbogenstil
- Established: 1842 (as a congregation)
- Completed: 1865

The Choral Synagogue, also called the Great Synagogue, is an Orthodox Jewish synagogue, located on Pylypa Orlyka Street, in Drohobych, Lviv Oblast in Ukraine. The congregation worships in the Ashkenazi rite.

== History ==
It was built between 1844 and 1863. Up to 1918 it served as the Main Synagogue of Galicia within the Austro-Hungarian Empire. After World War II Drohobych belonged to the Soviet Union. The authorities converted the building to a warehouse and altered it accordingly; and in later years it deteriorated.

After Ukraine gained its independence, the synagogue was returned to the Jewish community. Funded with the philanthropic support of Viktor Vekselberg, renovations started in 2014; were completed in 2018; and in 2019 the congregation received its first Torah since World War II.

== Architecture ==
The style of the three-story building is a variant of the then-popular Rundbogenstil style. The entry is framed by massive pilasters, surmounted by a decorated gable. Two windows are placed above it vertically. A larger gable, crowned by the tablets of the law surrounds the entry treatment. It again is supported on pilasters capped by decorative towers. Between the pilasters are vertical rows of three windows. The edges of the building's main façade a framed again by pilasters and topped by (smaller) towers. Another set of windows fills the space between the pilasters. This motif is repeated on all the façades, though on the north and south façades the three vertical windows are replaced by a three-story tall, round-headed window, and on the east façade, backing the Torah ark, the centre window of the three is round.

The two outer bays of the façade are stair towers, the building is actually as wide as the three central bays. The stairs lead to the two women's galleries, both of which are located above the entryway.

The main hall (the prayer hall of the men) is of the nine-bay type, a structure to be found in some synagogues of the early 17th century like the Great Suburb Synagogue, Lviv and the Great Maharsha Synagogue, Ostroh. In each of these synagogues, four supports are arranged in a square in the centre of the space visually divides it into nine units. The Bimah stood in the centre between the pillars.

== Gallery ==
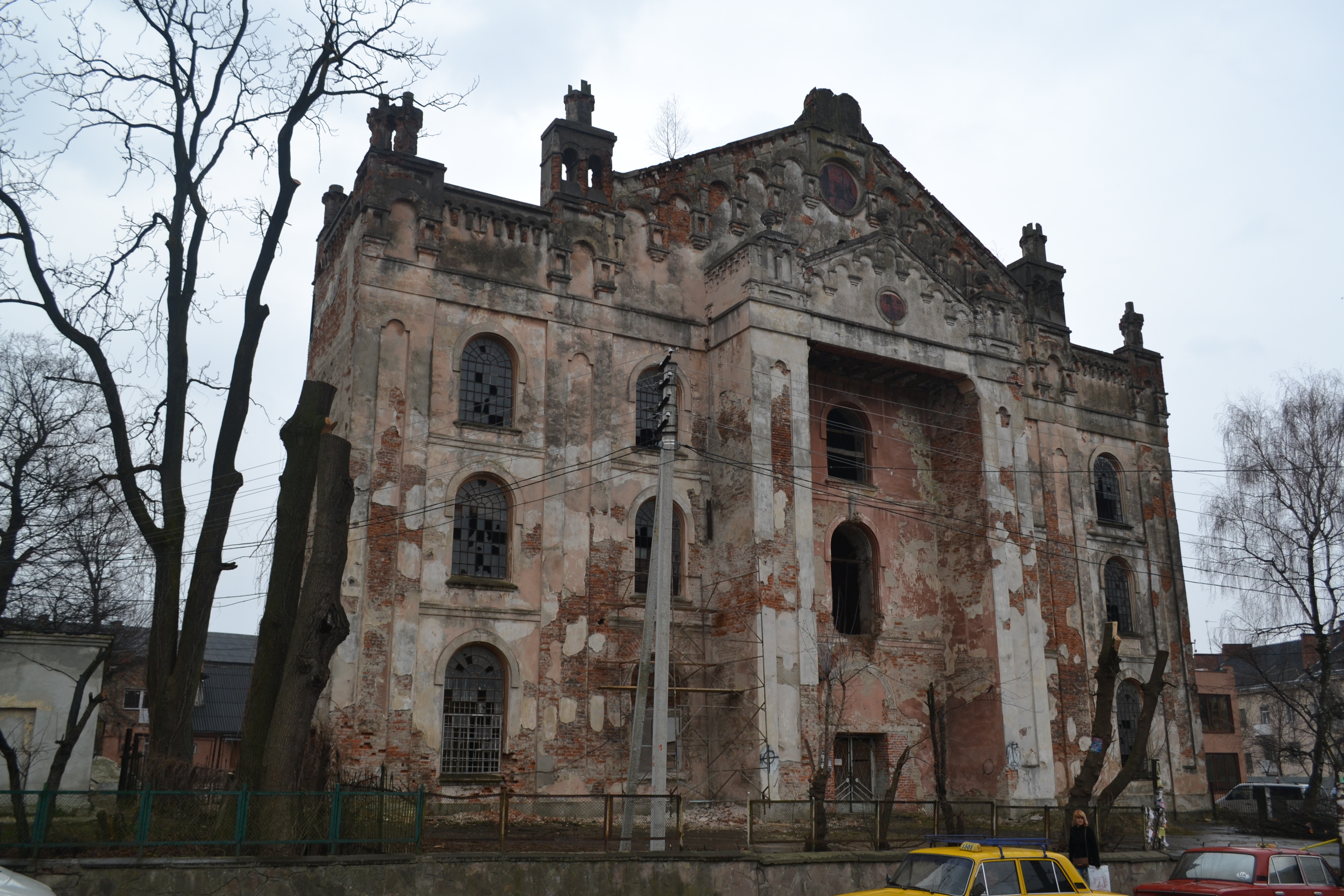
Choral Synagogue in 2014

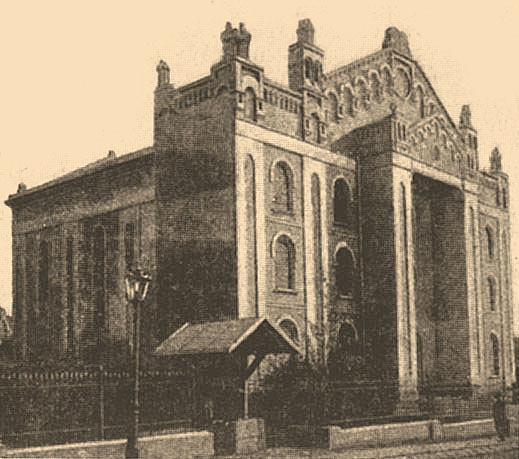
Brockhaus and Efron Jewish Encyclopedia illustration

== See also ==
- Drohobycz Ghetto
- History of the Jews in Ukraine
- List of synagogues in Ukraine
