= Choral Synagogue (Mariupol) =

Former synagogue in Mariupol, Ukraine

- Хоральна синагога
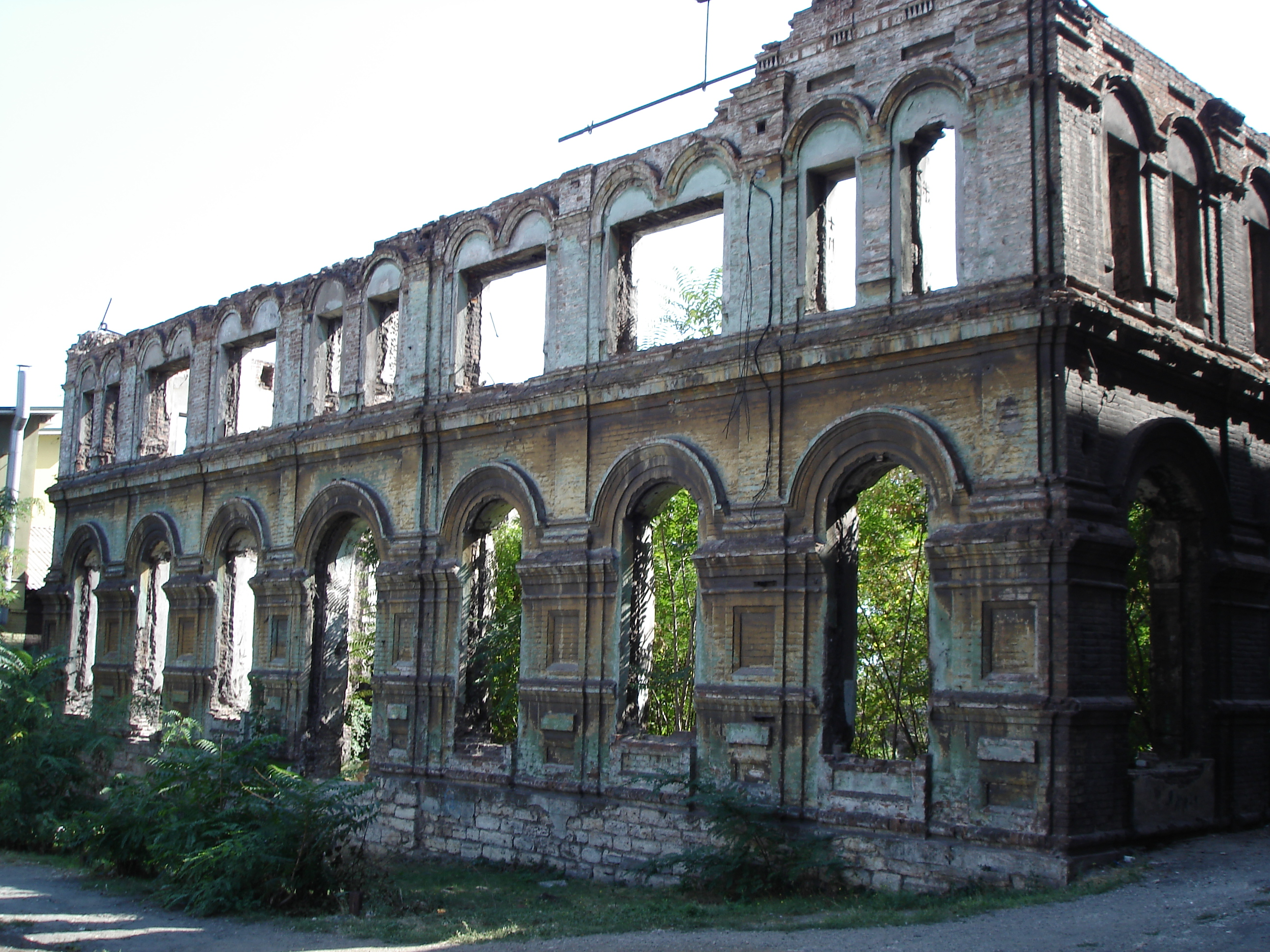
- The former Choral Synagogue façade

- Location of the former synagogue in Ukraine

Religion
- Affiliation: Orthodox Judaism (former)
- Ecclesiastical or organizational status: Synagogue (1882–1944)
- Status: Abandoned

Location
- Location: Heorhiivska Street 18, Mariupol, Donetsk Oblast
- Country: Ukraine
- Interactive map of Choral Synagogue
- Coordinates: 47°05′34″N 37°33′28″E

Architecture
- Type: Synagogue architecture
- Style: Neoclassicism
- Established: 1820 (as a Jewish community)
- Completed: 1882

The Choral Synagogue (Ukrainian: Хоральна синагога) is a former Orthodox Jewish synagogue in Georgievskaya Street 18, in Mariupol, Ukraine. It was established in the house of the merchant Anton Chabanenko in 1882. As of March 2024, parts of the building were standing, however it was no longer used as a house of worship.

== History ==
The first mention of the Jewish settlement in Mariupol dates from 1820.

=== Choral Synagogue, Georgievskaya Street ===
The Choral Synagogue in Georgievskaya Street 18 (Ukrainian: вулиця Георгіївська) was the second synagogue in Mariupol, and was established in the house of the merchant Anton Chabanenko in 1882. It was considered the second Jewish house of prayer in the history of the city.

One of the initiators of the opening of the synagogue was Iosif I. Averbakh (Auerbach), the father of academic Mikhail Iosifovich Averbakh (Russian: Михаи́л Ио́сифович Аверба́х), one of the founders and first director of the Helmholtz Central Institute of Ophtalmology.

Some sources claim that the synagogue was destroyed during the Nazi occupation of Mariupol during World War II.

Other sources inform that with the rise of the Bolsheviks in the early 20th century, the building of the synagogue was turned into a gymnasium, which it remained until the start of World War II. The building was practically not damaged during active hostilities. There is a version that the Germans opened a hospital in it, and when they retreated, tried to set fire to the building.

One of the Torah scrolls survived the history of the synagogue and was transferred to the adjacent Mariupol Museum of Local Lore for storage.

After World War II, the building repeatedly changed owners and functions. In 1944 it housed a branch of Gipromez, in the 1970s a medical school, then other teaching institutions. Until 1995, the building was considered communal property. Since 2016, the land has been owned by the Jewish community of Mariupol, but the building itself continued to be owned by a private individual.

During the 1990s, the roof collapsed under heavy snow. At the start of the XXI Century, only the facade and foundations remained of the building.

In 2021, an exhibition commemorating 80 years since the Holocaust in Ukraine was displayed in the remnants of the synagogue by the local municipality and Mayor Vadym Boychenko.

In early February 2022, the Department of Cultural and Civil Development of the Mariupol City Council announced that the Choral Synagogue may be included in the State Register of Immovable Monuments of Ukraine. In addition, the mayor's office applied for the restoration of the synagogue under the program of the President of Ukraine "Great Restoration". Furthermore, the Ministry of Culture of Ukraine was said considering the inclusion of the building in the register of synagogues. The plans of the Ukrainian authorities remained unfulfilled by the time the city of Mariupol was occupied by Russia.

==== Architecture ====
The Choral Synagogue was built in Neoclassical style, mainly using brick. The first floor was raised above the ground, and architectural features included high arches, frontal and interior cornices, a decorative triangular pediment with pedestals. The inside featured a columned hall with a place for studying the Torah in Hebrew, benches for worshipers, a stage for reading the Holy Scriptures, and women's prayer galleries.

In the late 1880s, a dome was erected, distinguishing the building from the surrounding area.

=== Other synagogues in Mariupol ===
From 1820 until the beginning of the twentieth century, four other synagogues and houses of worship were opened in the city.

According to the book Mariupol and its Environs (1892), the first synagogue in Mariupol was built in 1864 on Harlampievskaya Street (Ukrainian: вулиця Харлампіївська) at the initiative of artisan Abram Freiman. It was one of the oldest religious buildings in Mariupol. As of the 2020s, only part of the foundation and an arched gate have survived.

The third synagogue was built on Italiiska Street, Ukrainian: італійська вулиця) at some time after the Choral Synagogue, but little is known about it.

A fourth synagogue was built in Mykolaivska Street, 28 at some time after the Choral Synagogue.

== Gallery ==
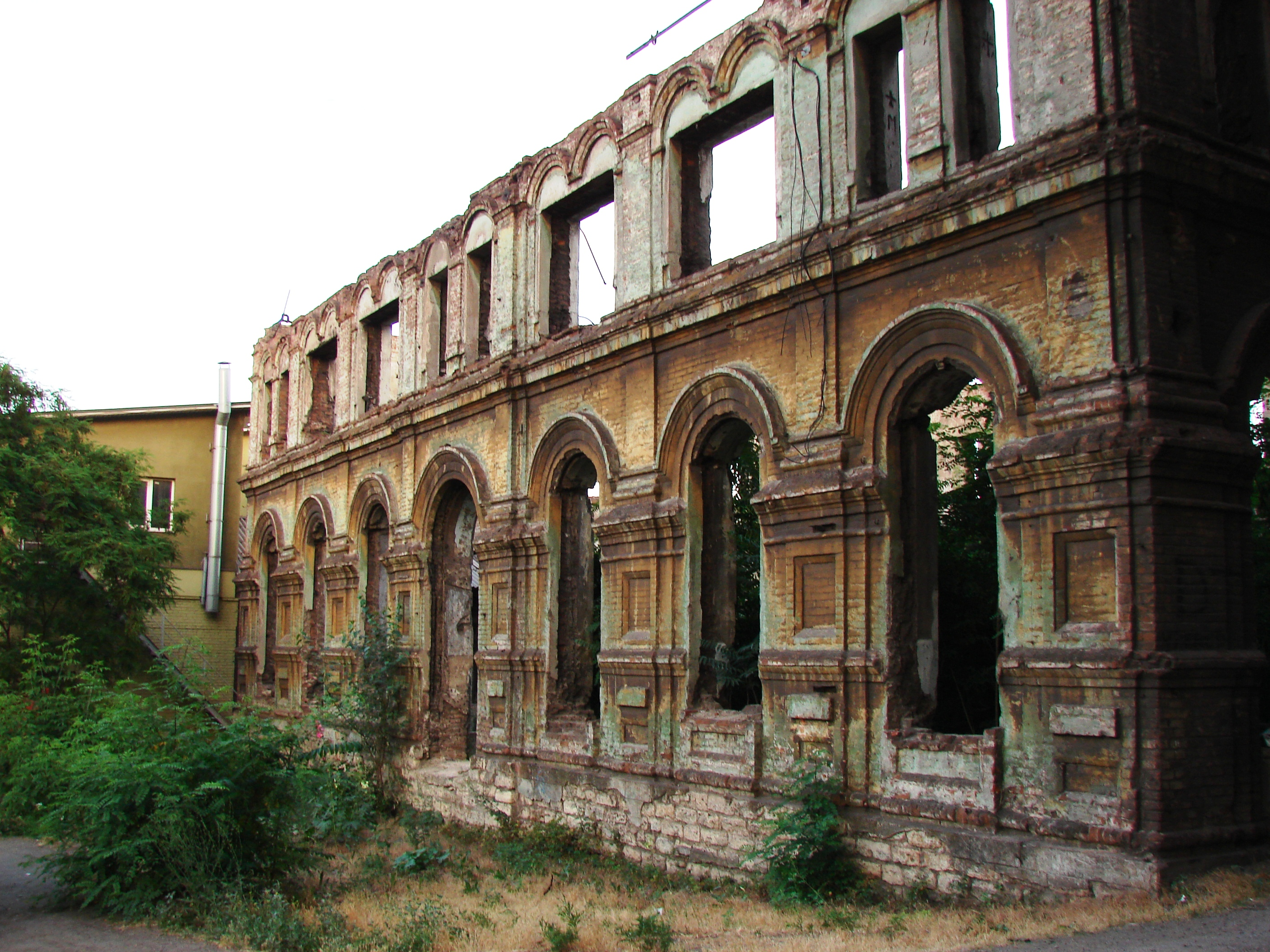
Choral Synagogue, front view

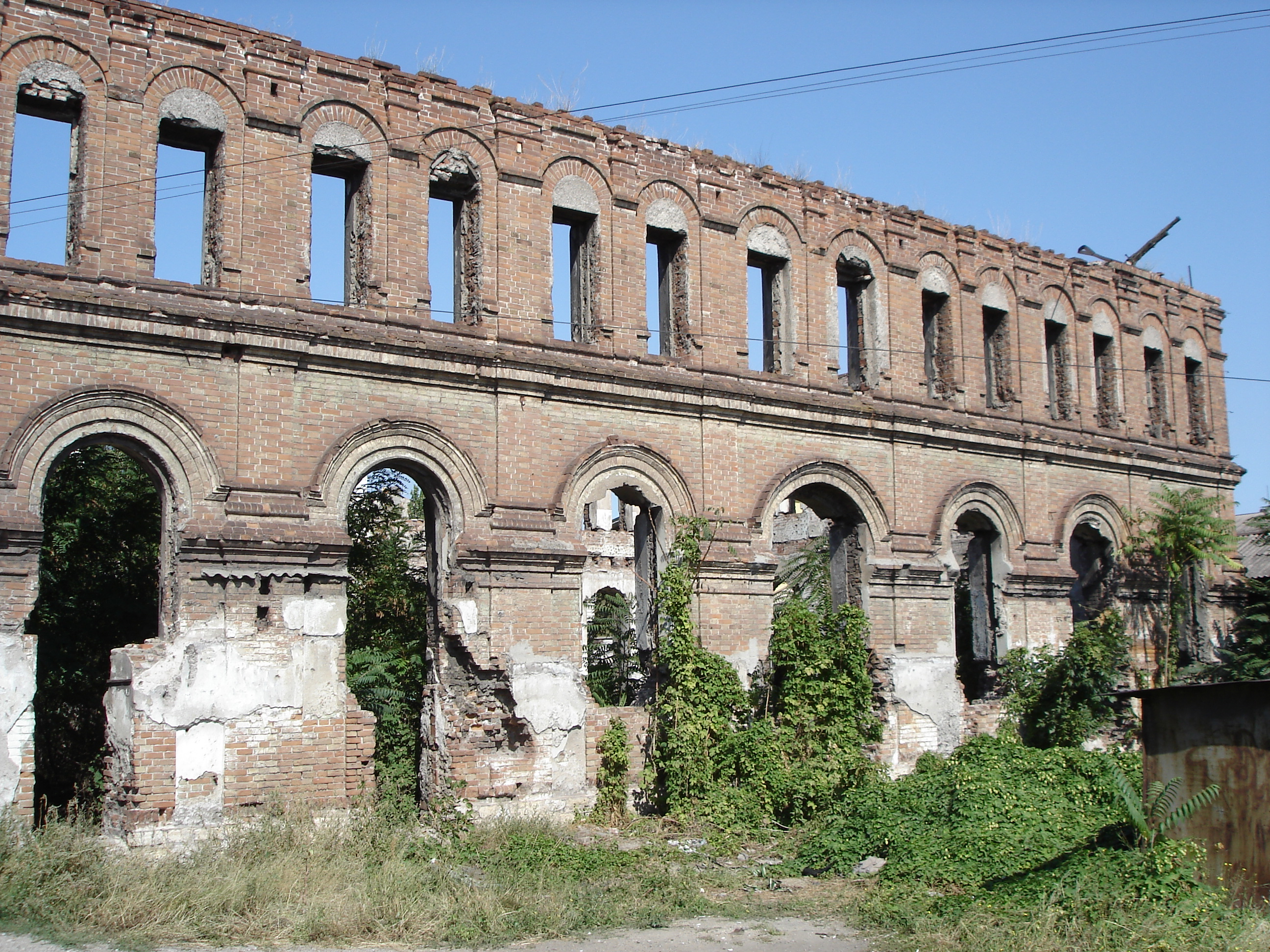
Choral Synagogue, rear view

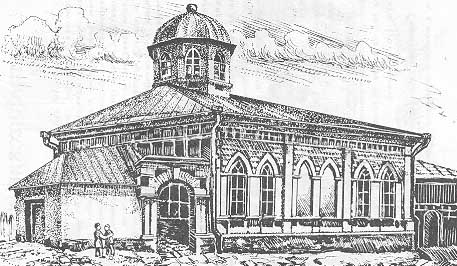
Choral Synagogue, drawing

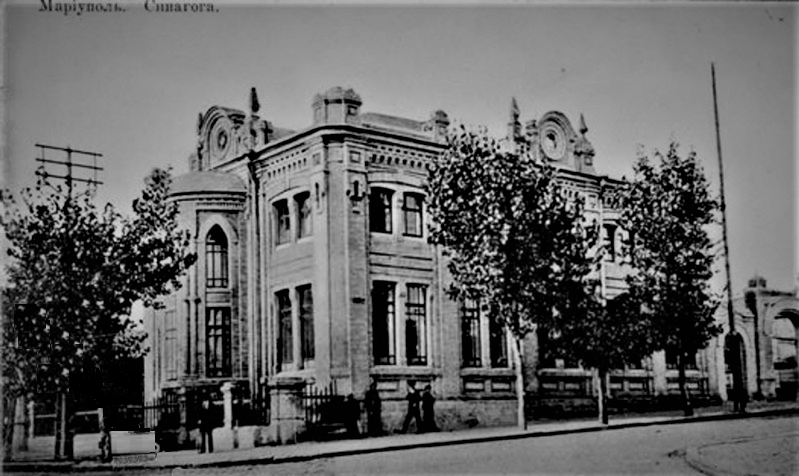
Mykolaivska Street Synagogue, 1900

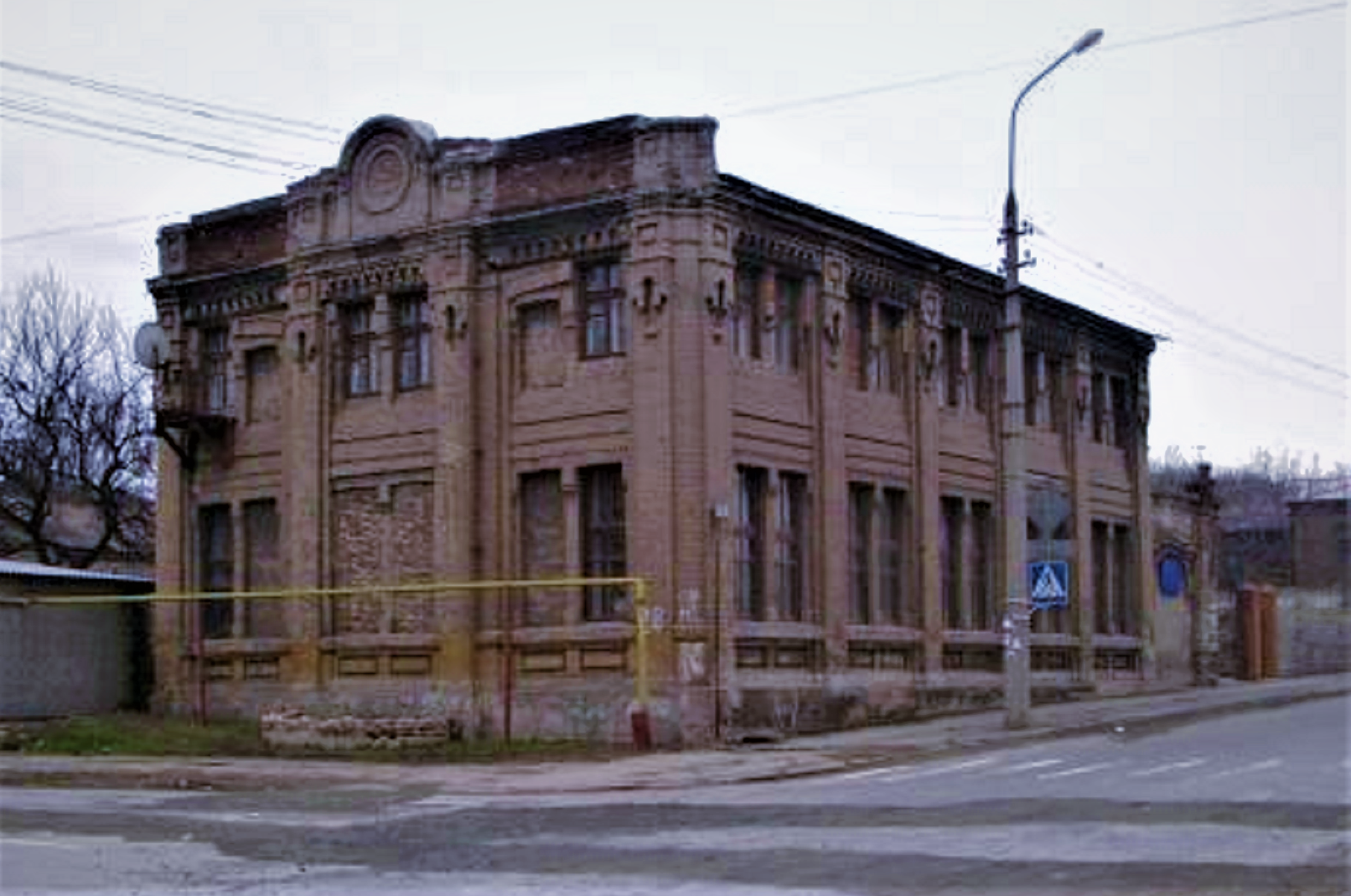
Mykolaivska Street Synagogue, 2000

== See also ==
- List of synagogues in Ukraine
- List of choral synagogues
