= List of synagogues in Ukraine =

This list of synagogues in Ukraine contains active, otherwise used and destroyed synagogues in Ukraine. In all cases the year of the completion of the building is given. Italics indicate an approximate date. Mostly preserved, but repurposed buildings are marked in light grey, seriously damaged and abandoned ones - in silver, entirely lost synagogues - in dark grey.

== Cherkasy Oblast ==
| Name | Location | Image | Completed | Destroyed | Remarks |
|---|---|---|---|---|---|
| Kaniv Synagogue | Kaniv | | Early 20th century | Partially preserved | Closed in 1930, now functions as a music school |
| Talne Synagogue | Talne | | ? | 1941 | Wooden synagogue, destroyed in WW2 |
| Zolotonosha Synagogue | Zolotonosha | | ? | Partially preserved | Closed in 1949 |
| Central Synagogue | Uman | | ? | 1950s | Closed in the 1930s and converted into a "Artisans' Club"; burned down in the late 1950s. |
| Great Synagogue | Uman | | late 17th-early 18th century | Partially preserved | Partially rebuilt several times; got minor damages in WW2; in the 1950s converted into an workshop for the Megohmmeter factory; |

== Chernihiv Oblast ==
| Name | Location | Image | Completed | Destroyed | Remarks |
|---|---|---|---|---|---|
| Chernihiv Choral Synagogue | Chernihiv | | 1876 | Partially preserved | Closed in the 1920s, currently used as a theatre |
| Horodnia Synagogue | Horodnia | | c. 1900 | 2001-2020 | Wooden synagogue, dismantled |
| Korop Synagogue | Korop | | 1886 | Abandoned | |
| Great Synagogue | Pryluky | | 1861 | Ruined | |

== Chernivtsi Oblast ==
| Name | Location | Image | Completed | Destroyed | Remarks |
|---|---|---|---|---|---|
| Boiany Synagogue | Boiany | 1917 | 1889 | World War II | Nearby Jewish cemetery has been preserved |
| Grossshil Synagogue | Chernivtsi | | 1853 | Partially preserved | Building currently in private ownership |
| Tempel Synagogue | Chernivtsi | | 1878 | Partially preserved | Closed in 1940, later burnt down; 1959 partially rebuilt and used as a cinema |
| Beit Tefilla Binyamin Synagogue | Chernivtsi | | 1923 | active | Cultural heritage monument of Ukraine |
| Boyaner Rebe Synagogue | Chernivtsi | | | Partially preserved | Functions as an administrative building |
| Korn Shil Synagogue | Chernivtsi | | late 19th century | active | Closed during World War II, reopened after 1991 |
| Hertsa Synagogue | Hertsa | | 1850 | Partially preserved | Used as a residential building |
| Novoselytsia Synagogue | Novoselytsia | | 1919 | Abandoned | |
| Sadhora Hasidic Synagogue | Sadhora | | 1842 | active | After 1940s functioned as a workshop. Fully restored and reopened in 2016. |
| Great Synagogue | Sadhora | | 1830 | Partially preserved | After 1950s used as a textile factory |
| Storozhynets Synagogue | Storozhynets | | 1890-1900 | Partially preserved | Functions as a sports school |
| Vyzhnytsia Synagogue | Vyzhnytsia | | 19th century | Partially preserved | Used as a house of culture |
| New Vyzhnytsia Synagogue | Vyzhnytsia | | 1895 | Partially preserved | Used as a school gym |
| Vyzhnytsia Hasidic Synagogue | Vyzhnytsia | | 2nd half of 19th century | Partially preserved | Used as a factory building |

== Crimea ==
| Name | Location | Image | Completed | Destroyed | Remarks |
|---|---|---|---|---|---|
| Alushta Synagogue | Alushta | 1910-1913 | late 19th-early 20th century | 2008 | Closed in 1923, turned into a cinema, later demolished |
| Bakhchysarai Kenassa | Bakhchysarai | | 1870 | Ruined | Closed in 1930, in 2010 transferred to a local museum, remains in an unsatisfactory condition |
| Bilohirsk Synagogue | Bilohirsk | | 1750 | 1942 | Destroyed in WW2 |
| Chufut-Kale Great Kenassa | Chufut-Kale | | 14th century | active | |
| Chufut-Kale Small Kenassa | Chufut-Kale | | 18th century | Partially preserved | Functions as a museum |
| Feodosia Choral Synagogue | Feodosia | | 1904 | Partially preserved | Functions as a house of navy officers |
| Feodosia Kenassa | Feodosia | | 1292 | Ruined during the Second World War | One of the world's oldest known kenassas |
| Soldiers' Synagogue | Sevastopol | | 1865-1873, 1910 (rebuilt) | Ruined during the Second World War | |
| Sevastopol Kenassa | Sevastopol | | 1896-1908 | Partially preserved | Closed in 1931, used as a sports hall, currently in private ownership |
| Simferopol Choral Synagogue | Simferopol | | 1881 | 1975 | Demolished and replaced with a department store |
| Simferopol Kenassa | Simferopol | | 1891-1896 | Partially preserved | Closed in 1930, returned to the Karaite community in 2014; original elements of decor lost during restoration. |
| Ner-Tomid Synagogue | Simferopol | | 19th century | active | Closed down in 1930, returned to the Jewish community in 1995 |
| Yevpatoria Merchant Synagogue | Yevpatoria | | 1911-1912 | Partially preserved | Closed down in 1928, used as a factory building |
| Eupatorian Kenassas | Yevpatoria | In April 2014 | 1805-1815 | active | The synagogue complex is the oldest active Karaite synagogue in the world |
| Yehiya-Kapay Synagogue | Yevpatoria | | 1911-1912 | active | Closed down in 1930, reopened in 2003 |

== Dnipropetrovsk Oblast ==
| Name | Location | Image | Completed | Destroyed | Remarks |
|---|---|---|---|---|---|
| Golden Rose Synagogue | Dnipro | | 1852 | active | 1924 workers' club and storehouse; 1996 returned to Jewish community |
| Small Synagogue | Dnipro | | | Partially preserved | A major shopping center, estimated in 2007 to be one of the largest shopping malls in all of Europe, borders three sides of the synagogue building. |
| Way of Prayer Synagogue | Dnipro | | Late 19th century | active | Currently functions as a yeshiva |
| Dnipro Kenassa | Dnipro | | 1887 | 1967 | Closed down in 1930, later demolished |
| Beit Reuven Synagogue | Kamianske | | 2008 | active | Built as a replica of Chabad's 770 Eastern Parkway synagogue |
| Beys Shtern Shulman Synagogue | Kryvyi Rih | | 2010 | active | Built on the site of a former Jewish prayer house, which was destroyed by Soviet authorities in 1932 |
| Kryvyi Rih Choral Synagogue | Kryvyi Rih | | 1899 | 1941 | After 1928 functioned as a Jewish house of culture, in 1936 turned into an aviation club; a nearby smaller synagogue continued to operate until 1941 |
| Samar Synagogue | Samar | | 1870s | Partially preserved | Closed in the 1920s, later used as a hospital |

== Donetsk Oblast ==
| Name | Location | Image | Completed | Destroyed | Remarks |
|---|---|---|---|---|---|
| Donetsk Synagogue | Donetsk | | 1910-1919 | active | Nationalized in 1931, restored to the Jewish community in late 1980s |
| Old Yuzovka Synagogue | Donetsk | | before 1910 | | |
| Second Yuzovka Synagogue | Donetsk | | | After 1938 | Under Soviet rule used as a medical workers' club |
| Choral Synagogue | Mariupol | | 1882 | 1990s | Last used as a synagogue in 1944; only outer walls remain |
| Hasidic Synagogue | Mariupol | | 1864 | 1941-1943 | Destroyed in WW2 |
| Mykolaivska Street Synagogue | Mariupol | | | Partially preserved | Used as an Adventist prayer hall |
| Yenakiyeve Synagogue | Yenakiyeve | | early 20th century | after 1959 | Closed down in 1930, after 1949 rebuilt as a theatre |

== Ivano-Frankivsk Oblast ==
| Name | Location | Image | Completed | Destroyed | Remarks |
|---|---|---|---|---|---|
| Bolekhiv Synagogue | Bolekhiv | | 1789 | In disrepair | Abandoned after WW2 |
| Dolyna Synagogue | Dolyna | | 1932 | Partially preserved | Closed in 1942, currently used as a Baptist house of prayer |
| Halych Synagogue | Halych | | 16th century | Partially preserved | Used as a commercial building |
| Halych Karaite Kenassa | Halych | | 1830 | 1986 | Memorial on the site of the building established in 2020 |
| Great Synagogue of Horodenka | Horodenka | | 1920s | Partially preserved | Built on the site of a 1743 wooden synagogue destroyed during WW1; currently used as a sport hall |
| Gwoździec Synagogue | Hvizdets | | c. 1640 | 1941 | Wooden synagogue; damaged during WWI; completely burnt in 1941 |
| Ivano-Frankivsk Great Synagogue | Ivano-Frankivsk | | 1895 | Partially preserved | Currently shared between the Jewish community and a furniture shop |
| Otyner Kloyz Synagogue | Ivano-Frankivsk | | | | |
| Kolomyia Synagogue | Kolomyia | | second half 19th century | 1941 | |
| Yerushalaim Synagogue | Kolomyia | | early 20th century | active | |
| Pechenizhyn Synagogue | Pechenizhyn | | 1795 | WW1 | Wooden synagogue, destroyed during WW1 |
| Valova Street Synagogue | Rohatyn | | 1904-1910 | Partially preserved | In private ownership, needs repair |
| Voinyliv Synagogue | Voinyliv | | | | Wooden synagogue |
| Yabluniv Synagogue | Yabluniv | | between 1650 and 1674 | c. 1914; in WWI | Wooden synagogue |
| Zabolotiv Synagogue | Zabolotiv | | 19th century | | |

== Kharkiv Oblast ==
| Name | Location | Image | Completed | Destroyed | Remarks |
|---|---|---|---|---|---|
| Kharkiv Choral Synagogue | Kharkiv | | 1912-1913 | active | Synagogue until 1923; communal use until 1980; restored as a synagogue in 1980; gutted by a fire in 1988 and restored in 2003; partially damaged in 2022 during the Russo-Ukrainian War |
| Mordvinov Synagogue | Kharkiv | | 1912-1914 | Partially preserved | Closed down in the 1930s; currently used as a planetarium |
| Soldiers' Synagogue | Kharkiv | | Early 19th century | 2019 | Closed after WW2; memorial plaque has been installed on the remains of the old building which was demolished in 2019 |
| Solianykivsky Lane Synagogue | Kharkiv | | 1911 | Partially preserved | Nationalized in 1929, rebuilt after WW2 in constructivist style |
| Chobotarska Synagogue | Kharkiv | | 1912 | active | Closed down in the 1930s, returned to the community in 2003; currently functions as a Jewish school; damaged during the Russian invasion of Ukraine |
| Kharkiv Karaite Kenassa | Kharkiv | | 1891-1893 | active | Closed down in 1929, returned to the Karaite community in 2006; damaged during the Russian invasion in 2022 |
| Lozova Synagogue | Lozova | | Before 1913 | c. 1978 | Devastated during a pogrom in 1919, closed under Soviet rule, between 1941 and 1961 functioned as a church |

== Kherson Oblast ==
| Name | Location | Image | Completed | Destroyed | Remarks |
|---|---|---|---|---|---|
| Kherson Kenassa | Kherson | | | 1975 | Demolished, currently a shopping mall is located on the site |
| Kherson Old Synagogue | Kherson | | 1780 | Partially preserved | Currently used as a planetarium |
| Kherson New Synagogue | Kherson | | 1895-1899 | active | Closed down in 1941, reopened in 1990; only functioning synagogue in Kherson |

== Khmelnytskyi Oblast ==
| Name | Location | Image | Completed | Destroyed | Remarks |
|---|---|---|---|---|---|
| Old Market Synagogue | Horodok | | ? | 1940s | Wooden synagogue |
| Great Synagogue of Iziaslav | Iziaslav | | 17th century | Neglected | Turned into a stable during the Khmelnytsky Uprising; reconstructed in the 18th century; damaged by fire in 1924; currently unused. |
| New Town Synagogue | Iziaslav | | 1834 | Partially preserved | Today used as a school |
| Kamianets-Podilskyi Synagogue | Kamianets-Podilskyi | | c. 1850; middle of 18th century | Partially preserved | Today used as a restaurant |
| Great Choral Synagogue | Khmelnytskyi | | 18-19th century | 1991 | Closed down in 1938, later used as a sports hall; replaced with a sports hall |
| Craftsmen's Synagogue | Khmelnytskyi | | 1890 | active | Reconstructed in 2009 |
| Kytaihorod Synagogue | Kytaihorod | | ? | 1940s | Wooden synagogue |
| BaH Synagogue | Medzhybizh | | before 1612 | 1950s | Damaged by Nazi occupiers during WW2, dismantled in the 1950s; only foundations remain |
| Mikhalpol Synagogue | Mykhailivka | | 1750 | 1941 | Wooden synagogue |
| Mynkivtsi Synagogue | Mynkivtsi | | 1787 | 1941 | Wooden synagogue |
| Orynyn Synagogue | Orynyn | | ? | 1941 | Wooden synagogue |
| Polonne Synagogue | Polonne | | ? | 1940s | Wooden synagogue |
| Polonne Second Synagogue | Polonne | | ? | 1940s | Wooden synagogue |
| Great Synagogue | Sataniv | | 1514 | active | Used as a warehouse from 1933; restored as a synagogue in 2012; one of the oldest synagogues in Ukraine |
| Shepetivka Synagogue | Shepetivka | | 1820-1840 | active | During the 1960s used as a sports hall; reopened in 1991 |
| Smotrych Synagogue | Smotrych | | 1745 | 1941 | Wooden synagogue |
| Great Synagogue | Starokostiantyniv | | 1625 | 1941 | Closed in 1930s, destroyed in WW2 |
| Ostropil Synagogue | Staryi Ostropil | | ? | 1940s | Wooden synagogue |
| Zarichanka Synagogue | Zarichanka (Chemerivtsi rural hromada) | | end of 17th century | 1940s | Wooden synagogue |
| Great Synagogue | Zhvanets | | 1725 | 1941 | Destroyed in WW2 |
| Zinkiv Synagogue | Zinkiv | | ? | 1940s | First synagogue in the town mentioned in the 15th century; destroyed in WW2. |

== Kirovohrad Oblast ==
| Name | Location | Image | Completed | Destroyed | Remarks |
|---|---|---|---|---|---|
| Kropyvnytskyi Choral Synagogue | Kropyvnytskyi | | 1895-1897 | active | Site of a massacre during the Hryhoriv Uprising in 1919; under Soviet rule used as a cinema club; returned to the Jewish community in 1991 |
| Oleksandriia Synagogue | Oleksandriia | | | Partially preserved | Currently functions as a Seventh-day Adventist reading hall |

== Kyiv and Kyiv Oblast ==
| Name | Location | Image | Completed | Destroyed | Remarks |
|---|---|---|---|---|---|
| Great Synagogue | Bila Tserkva | | 1860 | Partially preserved | Closed c. 1930; building well preserved; used as college; a decision to return the building to the Jewish community was taken in 2019; However, as of 2023 the college was still active on the premises. |
| Chornobyl Synagogue | Chornobyl | | ? | 1941 | Wooden synagogue |
| Great Choral Synagogue | Podil, Kyiv | | 1895 | active | 1929 riding stable; after 1945 again used as synagogue |
| Brodsky Choral Synagogue | Shota Rustaveli Street, Kyiv | | 1898 | active | 1929 artists' club; c. 1941 horse stable; 1955 puppet theatre; 1997 returned to Jewish community and restored as a synagogue from 2000 |
| Karaite Kenesa | Old Kyiv | | 1902 | Partially preserved | A Karaite synagogue until 1929; a drama centre since 1961 |
| Halytska Synagogue | Halytska Square, Kyiv | | 1910 | active | Closed as a synagogue in 1930; used a workers' canteen; reopened as a synagogue in 2004 |
| Merchants' Synagogue | Shota Rustaveli Street, Kyiv | | 1899 | Partially preserved | Closed in 1933, later used as a sports hall and a cinema |
| Pechersk Synagogue | Pechersk, Kyiv | | 1808-1809 | 1829 | Wooden synagogue developed by Andrey Melensky; burned down in 1829 after the expulsion of Jews from Kyiv by the decree of Tsar Nicholas I. |
| Place for Thoughts Synagogue | Babyn Yar, Kyiv | | 2021 | active | Wooden synagogue; part of Babyn Yar Holocaust Memorial Centre |
| Baryshpolsky Synagogue | Demiivka, Kyiv | | 1878 | Partially preserved | Destroyed during a pogrom by Polish troops in 1920; reconstructed and turned into a workers' club; today functions as a children's art centre |
| Lower Solomianka Synagogue | Solomianka, Kyiv | | 1897 | after 1931 | Built on the site of an earlier synagogue destroyed by fire; closed in 1930 and demolished; cooling tower of a power plant was built on the site |
| Khabne Synagogue | Poliske | | ? | 1941 | Wooden synagogue |
| Skvyra Synagogue | Skvyra | | 1711 | Active | Under the Soviet rule used as a grain storage; later functioned as a sewing workshop; reopened in 2004. |
| Beyker Synagogue | Vasylkiv | | Early 20th century | Abandoned | Closed in 1927, later used as a railway station; abandoned after the closure of the railway line in the 1990s |
| Pokrovska Street Synagogue | Vasylkiv | | Late 19th century | Partially preserved | Currently used as a school |

== Luhansk Oblast ==
| Name | Location | Image | Completed | Destroyed | Remarks |
|---|---|---|---|---|---|
| Lozova Pavlivka Synagogue | Brianka | | Before 1902 | After 1916 | Destroyed |
| Chabad Synagogue | Luhansk | | | active | |
| Choral Synagogue | Luhansk | | | 1930s | Closed in 1935, demolished |

== Lviv Oblast ==
| Name | Location | Image | Completed | Destroyed | Remarks |
|---|---|---|---|---|---|
| Belz Old Synagogue | Belz | | 1587 | 1806 | Wooden synagogue, burned down |
| Belz New Synagogue | Belz | 1905-1910 | 1843 | 1950s | Blown up by Nazis in 1942, ruins demolished. |
| Eshre Leo Synagogue | Belz | | 1909 | Abandoned | Rebuilt after WWI |
| Berezdivtsi Synagogue | Berezdivtsi (Novyi Rozdil urban hromada) | between 1900, 1939 | c. 1790; end 18th century | c. 1941 in WW II | |
| Bibrka Synagogue | Bibrka | | 1821 | Ruined | Closed during WW2; used to function as a storage facility |
| Borynia Synagogue | Borynia | | 19th century | 1940s | Destroyed during WW2 |
| Brody Synagogue | Brody | | 1742 | Ruined | |
| Busk Synagogue | Busk | | 1842-1843 | Partially preserved | Used as an Evangelical church |
| Chervonohrad Synagogue | Chervonohrad | 1910/24 | 1795-1800 | 1950s | Destroyed during WW2, later demolished |
| Dobromyl Synagogue | Dobromyl | | after 1765 | 1941 | Burned down during WW2 |
| Choral Synagogue | Drohobych | | 1863 | active | Warehouse after WW II; later ruined; renovated since 2016 |
| Progressive Synagogue | Drohobych | | 1909 | Partially preserved | Closed after WW2, used as a boxing venue |
| Felsztyn Synagogue | Skelivka | | c. 1900 | after WW2 | Wooden synagogue; devastated during the Second World War; after the war likely used as a residential house; lost |
| Horodok, Lviv Oblast Synagogue | Horodok | | | After 1934 | |
| Kamianka-Buzka Synagogue | Kamianka-Buzka | | 1730 | 1941 | Wooden synagogue; destroyed in WW2 |
| Khodoriv Synagogue | Khodoriv | between 1914, 1918 | 17th century | 1940s | Wooden synagogue, destroyed during WW2 |
| Khyriv New Synagogue | Khyriv | | 19th century | 1940s | Destroyed during WW2 |
| Old Khyriv Synagogue | Khyriv | | 1740 | 1940s | Wooden synagogue; destroyed during WW2 |
| Leshniv Synagogue | Leshniv | | c. 1677 | late 1950s | Damaged during WW1 and demstroyed in WW2, ruins demolished |
| Beit Chasidim Synagogue | Lviv | | 1791 | 1941 | Destroyed in WW2 |
| Golden Rose Synagogue (Hebrew: בית הכנסת טורי זהב) | Lviv | | 1582 | 1941 | Desecrated in August 1941; ruins demolished in 1943; now part of The Space of Synagogues |
| Great Suburb Synagogue | Lviv | | 1633 | 1941 | Ruins dismantled in the late 1940s |
| Great City Synagogue | Lviv | | 1801 | 1942 | Burned by the Nazis in August 1941; ruins destroyed in 1942 |
| Jakob Glanzer Shul | Lviv | | 1844 | Partially preserved | Used as a synagogue until 1962; various other uses during WWII and Soviet occupration; Jewish cultural centre and museum since 1995 |
| Tempel Synagogue | Lviv | | 1846 | 1941 | Destroyed by the Nazis during WWII |
| Tsori Gilod Synagogue | Lviv | | 1925 | active | Also known as Beis Aharon V'Yisrael Synagogue; 1941 used as a horse stable; afterwards storehouse; restored as a synagogue from 1989 |
| Nyzhankovychi Synagogue | Nyzhankovychi | | 18th century | 1940s | Destroyed in WW2 |
| Olesko Synagogue | Olesko | | 1844 | Ruined | |
| Radekhiv Synagogue | Radekhiv | | Late 18th century | Partially preserved | Closed after WW2; later used as a storage room |
| Rozdil Synagogue | Rozdil | | c. 1730 | c. 1907 | Destroyed by fire either 1907 or in WWI |
| Sasiv Synagogue | Sasiv | | 1790 | ? | Wooden synagogue, destroyed |
| Skelivka Synagogue | Skelivka | | c. 1800 | c. 1941 | Burnt down in WWII |
| Skhidnytsia Synagogue | Skhidnytsia | | c. 1880 | Partially preserved | The only remaining wooden synagogue in Ukraine to be still used for religious purposes; now functions as a Baptist house of prayer |
| Skole Synagogue | Skole | | | Partially preserved | Closed during WW2; currently used as a cinema |
| Sokal Great Synagogue | Sokal | | 1762 | Ruined | |
| New Synagogue | Sokal | | 1890 | Partially preserved | Now a community centre |
| Stara Sil Synagogue | Stara Sil | | Late 18th century | 1940s | Destroyed during WW2 |
| Staryi Sambir Synagogue | Staryi Sambir | | 1862 | Ruined | Damaged during WW2, later used as storage |
| Stryi Great Synagogue | Stryi | | 1817 | Ruined | Classicist vault was dismantled in the 1980s |
| Stryi Small Synagogue | Stryi | | 1689 | | Reconstruction c. 1886 |
| Toporiv Synagogue | Toporiv | | 19th century | Partially preserved | Closed after 1930; used as a storage facility |
| Turka Synagogue | Turka | | Mid-19th century | Partially preserved | Damaged during WW1, during WW2 housed the Jewish ghetto; closed down in 1945; currently functions as a joiner's workshop |
| Great Synagogue | Velyki Mosty | | c. 1900 | Ruined | Damaged during both WWI and WWII; the synagogue ruins have been deteriorating since c. 1950 |
| Syniovydsko Vyzhnie Synagogue | Verkhnie Syniovydne | | | 1940s | Destroyed during WW2 |
| Great Synagogue | Zhovkva | ZolkiewSynagoga | 1692 | Ruined | Partially destroyed during WWII; partial rebuild during the 1950s and 1990; included on the 2000 World Monuments Watch; remains partially restored |
| Zhuravne Synagogue | Zhuravno | | 18th century | Partially preserved | Currently functions as a post office |
| Zhydachiv Synagogue | Zhydachiv | | 1742 | c. 1941 in WW II | Well known for murals |

== Mykolaiv Oblast ==
| Name | Location | Image | Completed | Destroyed | Remarks |
|---|---|---|---|---|---|
| Nahartav Synagogue | Bereznehuvate | | Early 20th century | Partially preserved | Used by Jewish agricultural colonists, currently functions as a grain storage |
| Ashkenaz Synagogue | Mykolaiv | | ? | Partially preserved | Closed in 1934, resumed activity in 1946 as the city's only functioning synagogue, ultimately closed down in 1962 |
| Mykolaiv Chabad Synagogue | Mykolaiv | | 1877 | active | Nationalized in 1934, turned into a house of culture; returned to the Jewish community in 1995 |
| Great (Choral) Synagogue | Mykolaiv | | 1880-1884 | 1944 | Closed down in 1928, destroyed during WW2, only an annex remains |
| Mykolaiv Kenassa | Mykolaiv | | 1844-1847 | Partially preserved | Currently used as a wedding hall |
| Lyahina Street Synagogue | Mykolaiv | | Late 19th century | Partially preserved | Currently used as a shop |
| Old Synagogue of Mykolaiv | Mykolaiv | | 1819-1822 | abandoned | Closed in 1935, used as a young pioneers club, returned to the Jewish community in 1992, remains abandoned |
| Privoznaya Synagogue | Mykolaiv | | 19th century | Partially preserved | Closed in 1931, rebuilt, a theatre is currently located on the premises |
| Nova Odesa Synagogue | Nova Odesa | | Early 20th century | Ruined | Under the Soviet rule used as a sports hall; currently abandoned |
| Ochakiv Synagogue | Ochakiv | | 19th century | 1990s | |
| Golta Synagogue | Pervomaisk | | 1908 | ? | |
| Olviopol Synagogue | Pervomaisk | | Early 20th century | Partially preserved | Functions as a shop |
| Romanivka Synagogue | Romanivka | | Mid-19th century | Ruined | Built by Jewish agricultural colonists; closed in 1929, later used as a school and a storage building; currently abandoned |

== Odesa Oblast ==
| Name | Location | Image | Completed | Destroyed | Remarks |
|---|---|---|---|---|---|
| Bilhorod-Dnistrovskyi Synagogue | Bilhorod-Dnistrovskyi | | 1891 | Partially preserved | Closed down in 1940, used as a sports school; returned to Jewish community in 1998, but transferred back to communal ownership in 2018 |
| Beit Chabad Synagogue | Odesa | Bejt-Chabat-Synagoge | 1893 | active | Closed after 1920, used as a storage, returned to the Jewish community in 1992 |
| Brodsky Synagogue | Odesa | | 1867 | Under restoration | Since c. 1925 workers' club "Rosa Luxemburg"; later city archive; 2016 returned to Jewish community and under restoration |
| Kosher Meat Hackers' Synagogue | Odesa | | 1909 | Partially preserved | Closed down in early 1930s, returned to community in 1991; currently used as a Jewish community space |
| Kenesa Synagogue | Odesa | Karaite-Kenesa | 1895 | 1930s | Closed in 1927, destroyed by the Bolsheviks |
| Nachlas Eliezer Synagogue | Odesa | Nachlas Elieser Synagoge (2014) | 1890 | 1992 | Closed in 1920, reopened in 1954, the city's only active synagogue until 1989; ruined in 1992. |
| Or Sameach Synagogue | Odesa | Or-Sameach-Synagoge | 1855 | active | Since 1923 used as a museum, music theater, sports hall; 1996 returned to Jewish community |

== Poltava Oblast ==
| Name | Location | Image | Completed | Destroyed | Remarks |
|---|---|---|---|---|---|
| Main Choral Synagogue | Kremenchuk | | 1855 | 1943 | Destroyed during WW2 |
| Or Avner Chabad Synagogue | Kremenchuk | | 2002 | active | Built on the site of an earlier Hasidic synagogue |
| Yurovsky Synagogue | Kremenchuk | | Before 1917 | 2023 | Used as a used paper collection point; ondemned to demolition, to be replaced with a residential building |
| Lokhvytsia Synagogue | Lokhvytsia | | Early 20th century | Partially preserved | In Soviet times used as an incubator |
| Great Synagogue of Poltava | Poltava | | 1850 | Partially preserved | Nationalized and rebuilt in 1930s, currently used as a medical school |
| Great Choral Synagogue of Poltava | Poltava | | 1856 | Partially preserved | Burnt together with all Torah scrolls in 1911, reconstructed, closed in 1934; currently houses a philharmonic hall |
| Hasidic Synagogue of Poltava | Poltava | | 1870 | Partially preserved | Closed in 1930s, used as an industrial building |
| Hospital Synagogue of Poltava | Poltava | | c. 1901 | After 1990 | Closed in 1930s, used as a workshop, only facade survived after WW2; demolished and replaced with a market |
| Military Synagogue of Poltava | Poltava | | Late 19th century | Partially preserved | Closed in 1930s, used as an industrial space, currently a residential building |
| Misnagdim Synagogue | Poltava | | Early 20th century | 2013-2015 | Built on the site of an earlier wooden synagogue; under Soviet rule functioned as a cafe, later demolished |
| Moldavsky Synagogue of A. Zelensky | Poltava | | 1870 | 1970 | Closed in 1930s, used as a university building, demolished and replaced with a department store |
| Private Synagogue of A. Zelensky | Poltava | | 1870 | 1970 | Closed in 1930s, used as a university building, demolished and replaced with a department store |
| Tailors' Synagogue | Poltava | | Late 19th century | 1943 | Closed in 1930s, demolished by German troops in 1943 |

== Rivne Oblast ==
| Name | Location | Image | Completed | Destroyed | Remarks |
|---|---|---|---|---|---|
| Dubno Great Synagogue | Dubno | | 16th century | Partially preserved | Restored in 1784, returned to the Jewish community in 2018, restoration works ongoing |
| Oleksandriia Synagogue | Oleksandriia | | | 1940s | Destroyed during WW2 |
| Great Maharsha Synagogue | Ostroh | | 1620s | Partially preserved | Looted during WW2, later used as a warehouse, restoration works ongoing since 2016 |
| Great Synagogue | Radyvyliv | | 1933 | Partially preserved | Damaged during WW2, after 1959 used as cinema |
| Berek Joselewicz Street Synagogue | Rivne | | | 1940s | Ruined during WW2 |
| Hegberg Synagogue | Rivne | | | Partially preserved | Closed down during WW2, currently used as a shop |
| Old Kloyz Synagogue | Rivne | | Before 1900 | active | Desecrated during WW2, later used as a sports hall, returned to the Jewish community after 1991 |
| Rivne Great Synagogue | Rivne | | 1874 | Partially preserved | Currently used as a sports school and trading hall |
| Torhovytsia Synagogue | Torhovytsia, Rivne Oblast | | 1820 | 1941 | Wooden synagogue, destroyed during WW2 |

== Sumy Oblast ==
| Name | Location | Image | Completed | Destroyed | Remarks |
|---|---|---|---|---|---|
| Hlukhiv Synagogue | Hlukhiv | | 1867-1870 | 1941 | During the 1930s closed and used as an archive, destroyed during WW2 |
| Krolevets Synagogue | Krolevets | | 1860s | Partially preserved | Reconstructed in the 1890s, currently used as an arts school |

== Ternopil Oblast ==
| Name | Location | Image | Completed | Destroyed | Remarks |
|---|---|---|---|---|---|
| Great Synagogue | Berezhany | | 1718 | Ruined | After WW2 used as a grain storage, later abandoned |
| Buchach Great Synagogue | Buchach | | 1728 | 1940s | Reconstructed in 1831, 1870 and 1920s; destroyed during WW2 |
| Budaniv Synagogue | Budaniv | | 19th century | Abandoned | Reconstructed in 1922, in Soviet times functioned as a residential building |
| Chortkiv Old Synagogue | Chortkiv | 2016 | 1771 | Partially preserved | Devastated during WW2, in 2019 returned to the Jewish community |
| Chortkiv Hasidic Synagogue | Chortkiv | 2011 | 1905-1909 | Partially preserved | Damaged during WW1, restored in 1925-1927, damaged again in WW2; currently used as a school building |
| Yaniv Terebovelskyi Synagogue | Dolyna | Synagogue in the 1920s | c. 1700 | c. 1941 | Wooden synagogue; burnt down in WW2 |
| Great Synagogue | Husiatyn | | 1654 | Abandoned | Damaged during WW II; renovated c. 1960 as a museum; deteriorating since c. 1990 |
| Kozliv Synagogue | Kozliv | | | Partially preserved | Closed down during WW2, currently used as a residential building |
| Kremenets Great Synagogue | Kremenets | 1925 | 1839 | 1941 | Destroyed in WW2 |
| Dubno Suburb Synagogue | Kremenets | | 1839 | Partially preserved | Closed in 1942; currently serves as a bus station |
| Great Synagogue | Pidhaitsi | Pidhaitsi Synagogue RB | before 1627 | 2019 | Abandoned during WW2; used for grain storage thereafter, then in a ruinous state before its collapse in 2019 and subsequent demolition |
| Great Synagogue | Shumsk | | 1780 | After 1928 | |
| Skala-Podilska Synagogue | Skala-Podilska | | Late 19th century | Partially preserved | Closed down in 1940s, currently used as a residential building |
| Ternopil Great Synagogue | Ternopil | | 1662-1668 | 1944 | Damaged during WW2, later demolished |
| Vyshnivets Synagogue | Vyshnivets | | 19th century | Partially preserved | Currently used as an office building |
| Yazlovets Synagogue | Yazlovets | | 16th century | c. 1941 | Burned down during WW1, restored in 1920s, destroyed during WW2 |
| Zaliztsi Synagogue | Zaliztsi | | ? | Partially preserved | Used as a residential building |

== Vinnytsia Oblast ==
| Name | Location | Image | Completed | Destroyed | Remarks |
|---|---|---|---|---|---|
| Great Synagogue | Bar | | 1717 | 1941 | Destroyed in WW2 |
| Bershad Synagogue | Bershad | | c. 1820 | active | Neither destroyed during World War II nor closed after the war; still active |
| Chechelnyk Synagogue | Chechelnyk | | c. 1750 | Ruined | Closed in 1926, restoration commenced in 2018 |
| Illintsi synagogue | Illintsi | | 18th century | Partially preserved | Currently used as a furniture workshop |
| Ozaryntsi Synagogue | Ozaryntsi | | c. 1775-1825 | Ruined | Destroyed during WW2 |
| Pohrebyshche Synagogue | Pohrebyshche | | c. 1690 | c. 1941 | A former wooden synagogue; used as a workers' club from 1928; destroyed during WWII |
| Great Synagogue | Sharhorod | | 1589 | active | One of the oldest synagogues in Ukraine; closed in early 1930s, currently returned to the Jewish community |
| Tulchyn Great Synagogue | Tulchyn | | 1815 | 1949 | |
| Lifshytz Synagogue | Vinnytsia | | 1897 | active | Closed in 1927, used as a theatre, returned to the Jewish community in 1992 |
| Yaryshiv Synagogue | Yaryshiv | | 1750 | 1941 | Wooden synagogue, destroyed during WW2 |

== Volyn Oblast ==
| Name | Location | Image | Completed | Destroyed | Remarks |
|---|---|---|---|---|---|
| Berestechko Synagogue | Berestechko | | 1827-1885 | Partially preserved | After WW2 used as a sausage factory; since 1992 a music school |
| Druzkopol Synagogue | Zhuravnyky, Lutsk Raion | | c. 18th century | ? | Destroyed |
| Horokhiv Synagogue | Horokhiv | | | 1941 | Wooden synagogue, destroyed during WW2 |
| Korytnytsia Synagogue | Korytnytsia | | | 1941 | Wooden synagogue, destroyed during WW2 |
| Kovel Great Synagogue | Kovel | | Late 19th century | Partially preserved | After WW2 turned into a textile factory |
| Liuboml Synagogue | Liuboml | | 1510 | 1947 | |
| Lukiv Synagogue | Lukiv | | 1781 | 1940s | Destroyed during WW2 |
| Galician Synagogue | Lutsk | | After 1862 | Partially preserved | Currently a residential building |
| Great Synagogue | Lutsk | | 1629 | active | Partially destroyed after 1942; after 1970 restored; used as a sports club in 2021 transferred to the Jewish community |
| Kenesa, Lutsk | Lutsk | | 1814 | 1972 | Wooden kenesa of the Karaite community, burned down |
| Olyka Synagogue, Lutsk | Lutsk | | Before 1862 | Partially preserved | Closed during WW2, later used as a cinema, now a cafe |
| Puric Synagogue | Lutsk | | | | Second floor constructed after WW2, currently an office building |
| Olyka Great Synagogue | Olyka | 1925 | 1879 | c. 1942 | Wooden synagogue; destroyed sometime after July 1942 |
| Pavlivka Synagogue | Pavlivka | 1930 | 18th century | 1940s | Wooden synagogue, destroyed in WW2 |
| Volodymyr- Great Synagogue | Volodymyr | | 1801 | 1951 | Damaged during WW2, later demolished |

== Zakarpattia Oblast ==
| Name | Location | Image | Completed | Destroyed | Remarks |
|---|---|---|---|---|---|
| Great Synagogue | Berehove | | c. 1890 | Partially preserved | Closed in 1959; covered by concrete shell and used as theatre |
| Bila Tserkva Synagogue | Bila Tserkva | | | 1944 | Wooden synagogue, destroyed in WW2 |
| Bilky Synagogue | Bilky | 1910/16 | ? | ? | Destroyed |
| Synagogue Chop | Chop | | 1908 | 1944 | Destroyed during WW2 |
| Dovhe Synagogue | Dovhe | | 1884 | ? | Destroyed |
| Khust Synagogue | Khust | | 1878 | active | Continued to operate under Soviet rule |
| Mukachevo Synagogue | Mukachevo | | | 1944 | Destroyed during WW2 |
| Uzhhorod Synagogue | Uzhhorod | | 1904 | Partially preserved | Used as a synagogue until 1944; used as a concert hall since 1947 |
| Velyki Komyaty Synagogue | Velyki Komyaty, Berehove Raion, Zakarpattia Oblast | | Early 20th century | Partially preserved | Only wooden synagogue in Ukraine preserved in its original state. Relocation to an open-air museum in Uzhhorod is planned for 2025, where the synagogue will serve as a cultural space for the Jewish community. |
| Vynohradiv Synagogue | Vynohradiv | | 1874-1905 | active | During Soviet rule used as a sports school; reconstructed since 2012, currently in municipal ownership |

== Zaporizhzhia Oblast ==
| Name | Location | Image | Completed | Destroyed | Remarks |
|---|---|---|---|---|---|
| Berdyansk Kenassa | Berdyansk | | 1899 | Partially preserved | Destroyed |
| Berdyansk Synagogue | Berdyansk | | 1850/1857 | ? | Closed in 1920s, since 1930s used as sports club |
| Giymat-Rosa Synagogue | Zaporizhzhia | | 2005-2012 | active | Built as a miniature copy of the Temple of Jerusalem |
| Synagogue of Tailors | Zaporizhzhia | | 1888 | active | Returned to the Jewish community in 1991, restored in 1995 |
| Zaporizhzhia Choral Synagogue | Zaporizhzhia | | 1898 | Partially preserved | Natinalized in 1929, currently functions as an office space |

== Zhytomyr Oblast ==
| Name | Location | Image | Completed | Destroyed | Remarks |
|---|---|---|---|---|---|
| Berdychiv Choral Synagogue | Berdychiv | 1913 | 1850 | Partially preserved | Closed in 1929, later housed an atheist club, restored to the Jewish community in 1946; closed again in 1964 and transformed into a glove factory |
| Horodnytsia Synagogue | Horodnytsia | | c. 1900 | Partially preserved | Damaged in WW2, currently used as a town hall |
| Korosten Synagogue | Korosten | | | Active | |
| Norynsk Synagogue | Norynsk | Norynsk Wooden Synagogue | c. 1800 | ? | Wooden synagogue, destroyed |
| Ovruch Synagogue | Ovruch | | ? | 1941 | Wooden synagogue, destroyed in WW2 |
| Radomyshl Synagogue | Radomyshl | | 1887 | c. 1930 | Burnt down in 1926; demolished in the 1930s |
| Great Synagogue | Zviahel | | 1740 | c. 1945 | Destroyed during or immediately after WW2 |

== See also ==
- History of the Jews in Ukraine
