= Tsori Gilod Synagogue =

Synagogue in Lviv, Ukraine

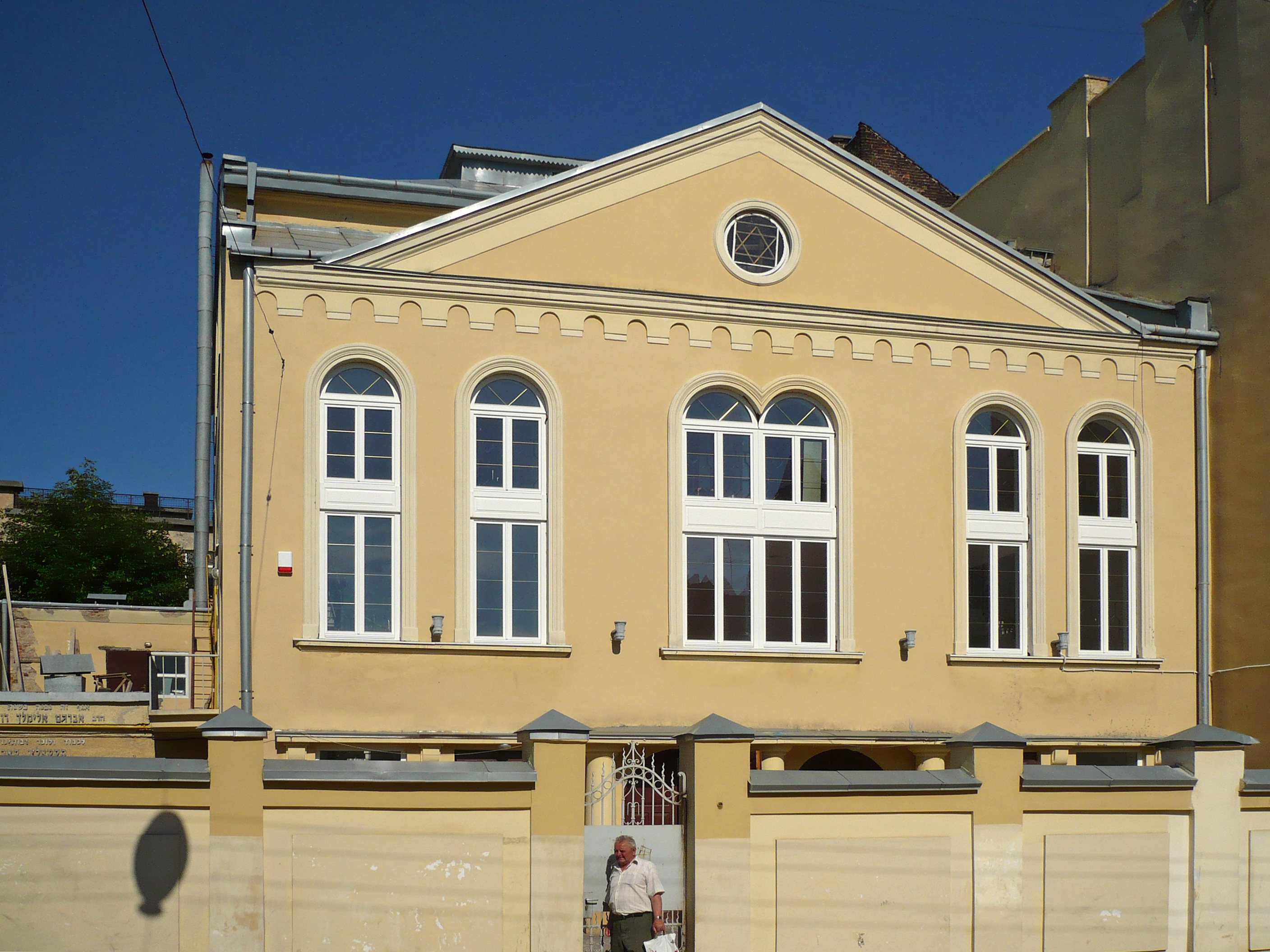
- The synagogue façade in 2008

- Location of the synagogue in Ukraine

Religion
- Affiliation: Orthodox Judaism
- Ecclesiastical or organizational status: Synagogue (1925–1939); Stables (1939–1945); Warehouse (1945–1989); Synagogue (since 1989)
- Ownership: Beis Aharon V’Yisrae community
- Status: Active
- Notable artwork: Murals by: Maurycy and Eryk Fleck (attrib.); Maximilian Kugel (Mykhailo Kuhel)

Location
- Location: 4 Brativ Mikhnovskykh Street, Lviv, Lviv Oblast 79018
- Country: Ukraine
- Interactive map of Tsori Gilod Synagogue
- Coordinates: 49°50′17″N 24°00′16″E

Architecture
- Architect: Albert Kornblüth
- Type: Synagogue architecture
- Style: Baroque; Rundbogenstil
- Completed: 1925
- Materials: Brick

The Tsori Gilod Synagogue, known in more recent times as Beis Aharon V'Yisrael Synagogue (transliterated from Hebrew as "The House of Aaron and Israel"), is an Orthodox Jewish synagogue, located at 4 Brativ Mikhnovskykh Street, in Lviv, in the Lviv Oblast of Ukraine.

== History ==
The Tsori Gilod Synagogue is the only remaining functioning synagogue in Lviv.

Designed by Albert Kornblüth in the Baroque style, the synagogue was completed in 1925. The construction was financed by Jewish charity "Tsori Gilod" (Polish: Cori Gilod; transliterated from Hebrew as "Healing Balm"), and was designed to accommodate 384 worshipers.

During World War II, the synagogue building was repurposed by the Nazis as a horse stable. After 1945, under the Soviet regime, the synagogue was used as a warehouse.

In 1989, the building was returned to the Jewish community. It was renovated from 1995 to 1997, and again from 1999 to 2000. In 2004–5, under the initiative of HGSS Friends of Lviv (a charity associated with Hampstead Garden Suburb Synagogue in London), and with substantial funding from the Rohr family of New York and Miami, it underwent a major interior renovation under the direction of architect Aron Ostreicher. At the same time the magnificent artwork on the walls and ceilings was restored. These murals of the synagogue are some of the few surviving synagogue paintings in Ukraine. Unfortunately, due to an unprofessional renovation they have lost a touch of the author's soul and their authentic values.

== Gallery ==
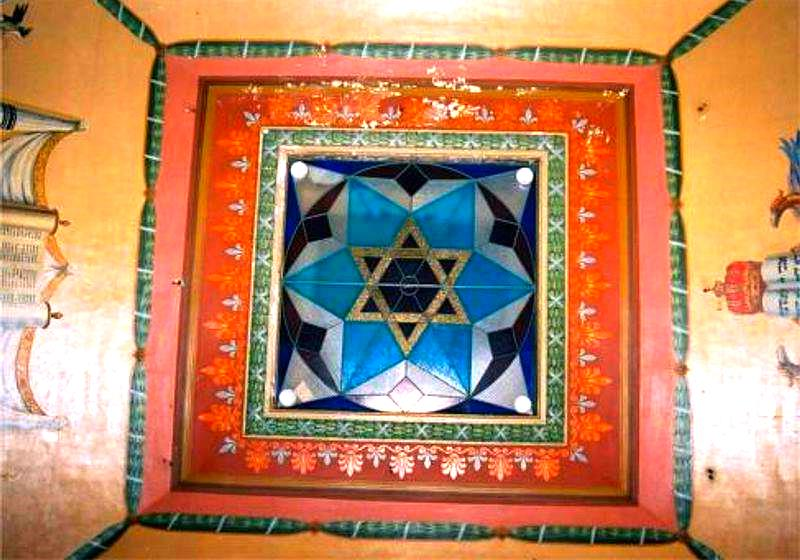
Interior of the synagogue, in 2006

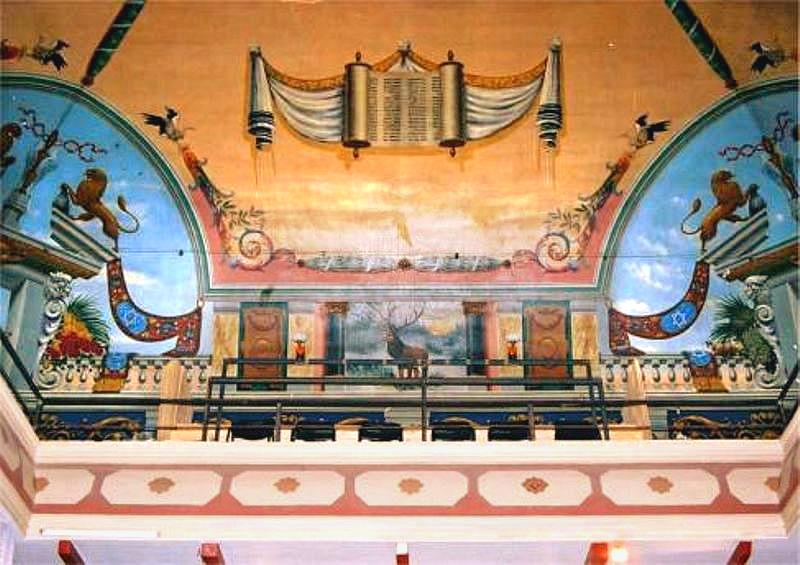
Interior of the synagogue, in 2006

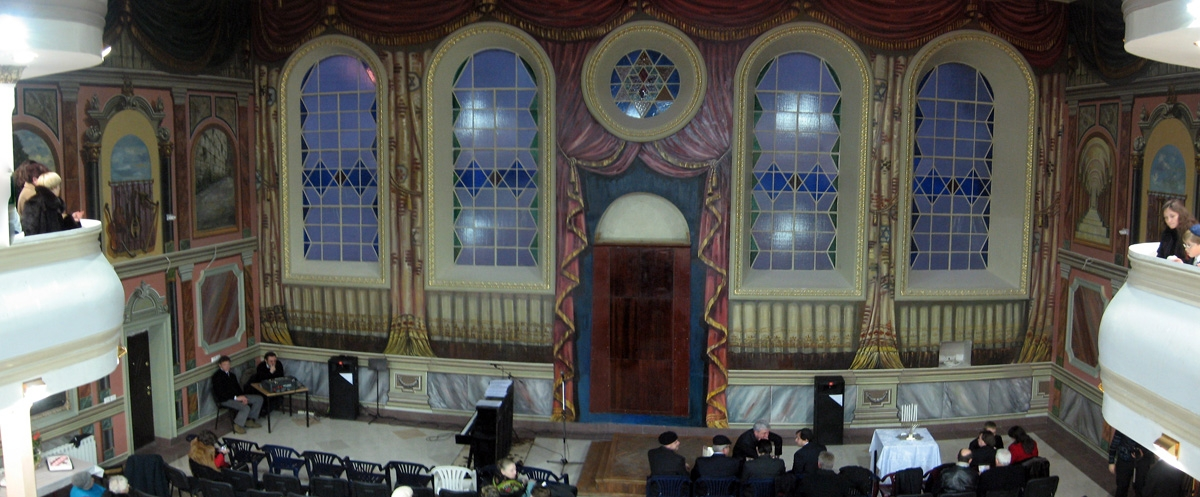
Interior of the synagogue, in 2007

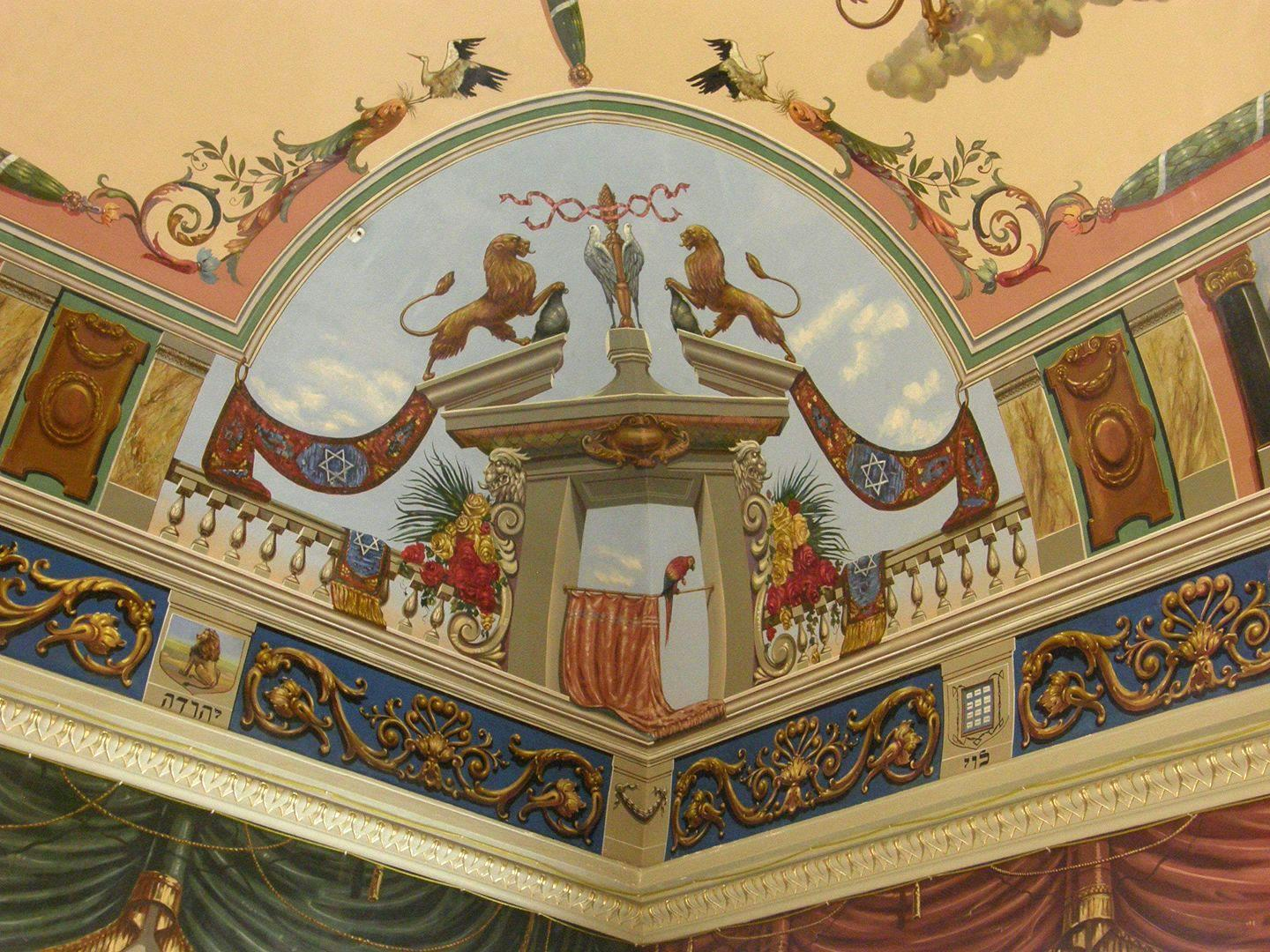
Murals of the interior, in 2018

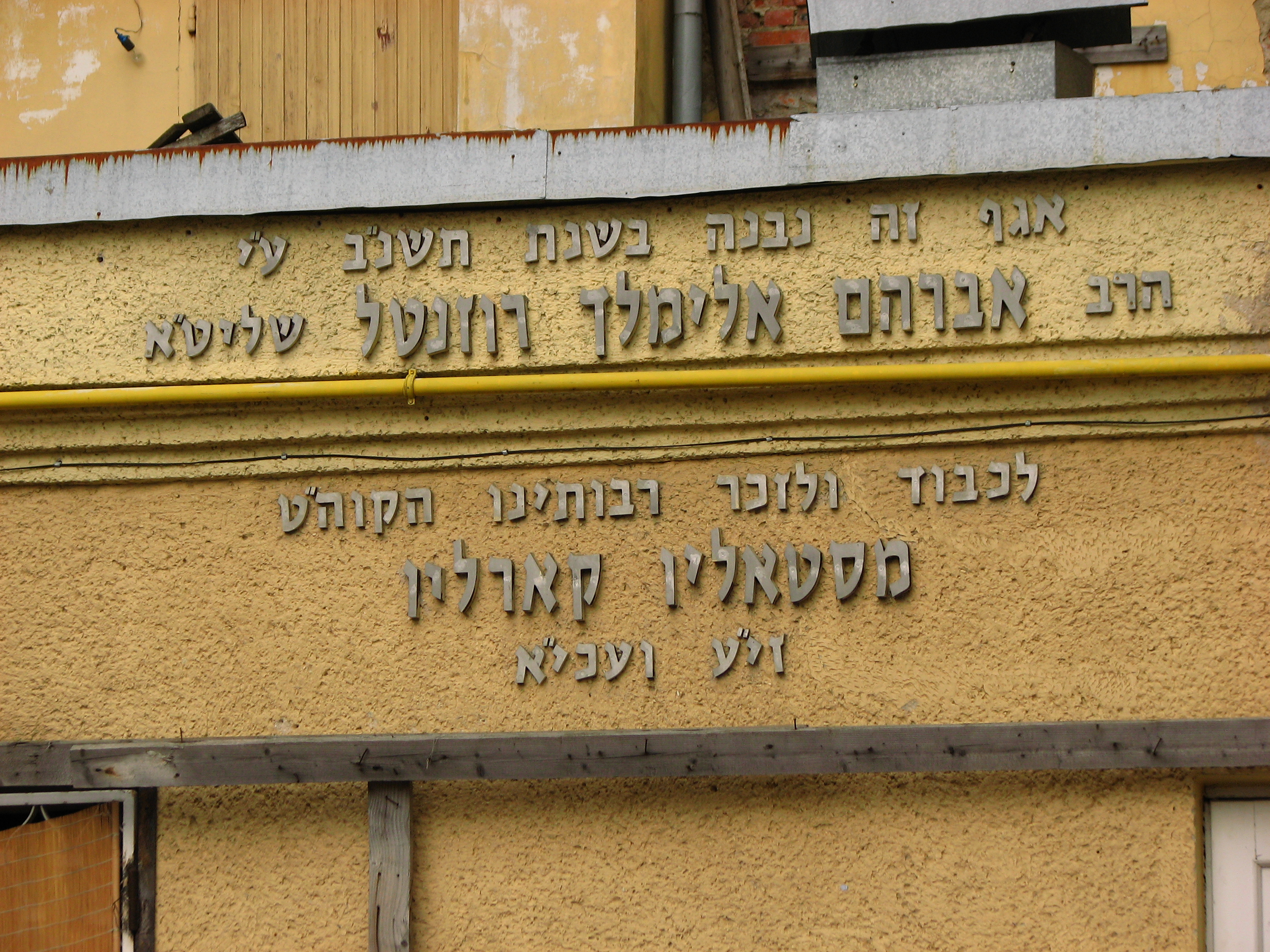
Exterior detail in 2012

== See also ==
- History of the Jews in Ukraine
- List of synagogues in Ukraine
