= Great Synagogue (Berehove) =

Former synagogue in Berehove, Ukraine

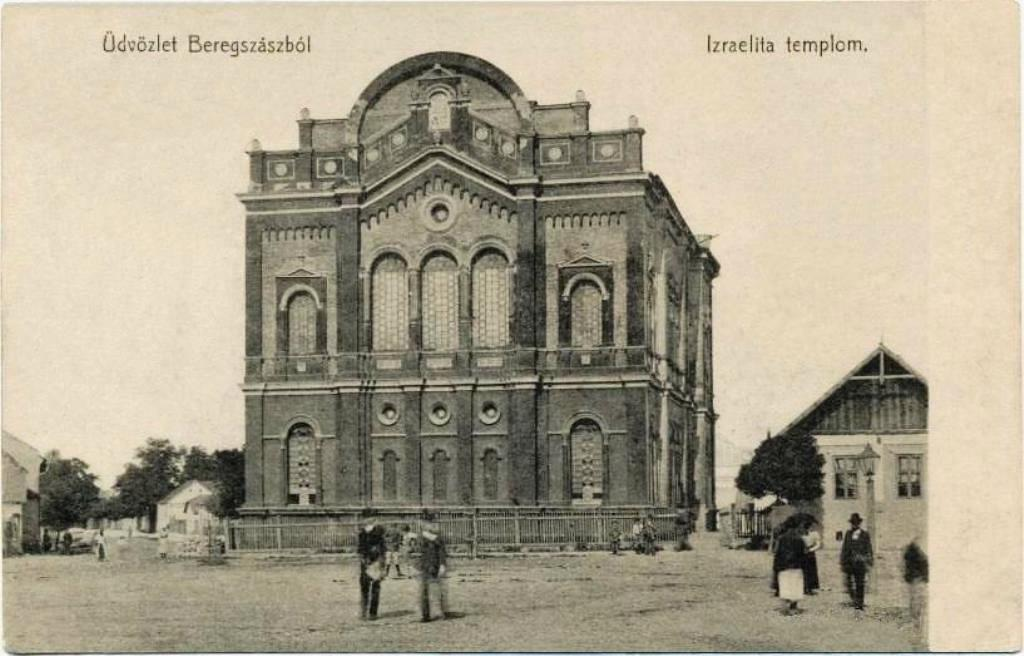
- The former synagogue, c. 1900

- Location of the former syanguge in Ukraine

Religion
- Affiliation: Orthodox Judaism (former)
- Rite: Nusach Ashkenaz
- Ecclesiastical or organizational status: Synagogue (c. 1890s–1959); Theater and cultural center (since 1959)
- Status: Abandoned (as a synagogue); Repurposed (as a theater and cultural center)

Location
- Location: Berehove, Zakarpattia Oblast
- Country: Ukraine
- Interactive map of Great Synagogue
- Coordinates: 48°12′23″N 22°38′30″E

Architecture
- Completed: c. 1890s
- Materials: Brick

The Great Synagoge is a former Orthodox Jewish synagogue, located in Berehove, in the Zakarpattia Oblast of Ukraine. The former synagogue was completed in the late 19th century and the congregation worshipped in the Ashkenazi rite.

The building has been used as a theater and cultural center since 1959.

== History ==
It was not destroyed during World War II and used as a synagogue until 1959, when it was confiscated by the Soviet authorities. The interior was converted into a theatre and cultural centre. A concrete shell was built around the building; though the original building was kept intact, it could no longer be seen. Today the facade of it is covered with a huge drapery, showing a picture of the original facade.

In 2022 it was announced that the shell would be dismantled and the facade of the synagogue restored. A completion date of late 2024 was estimated.

== Gallery ==
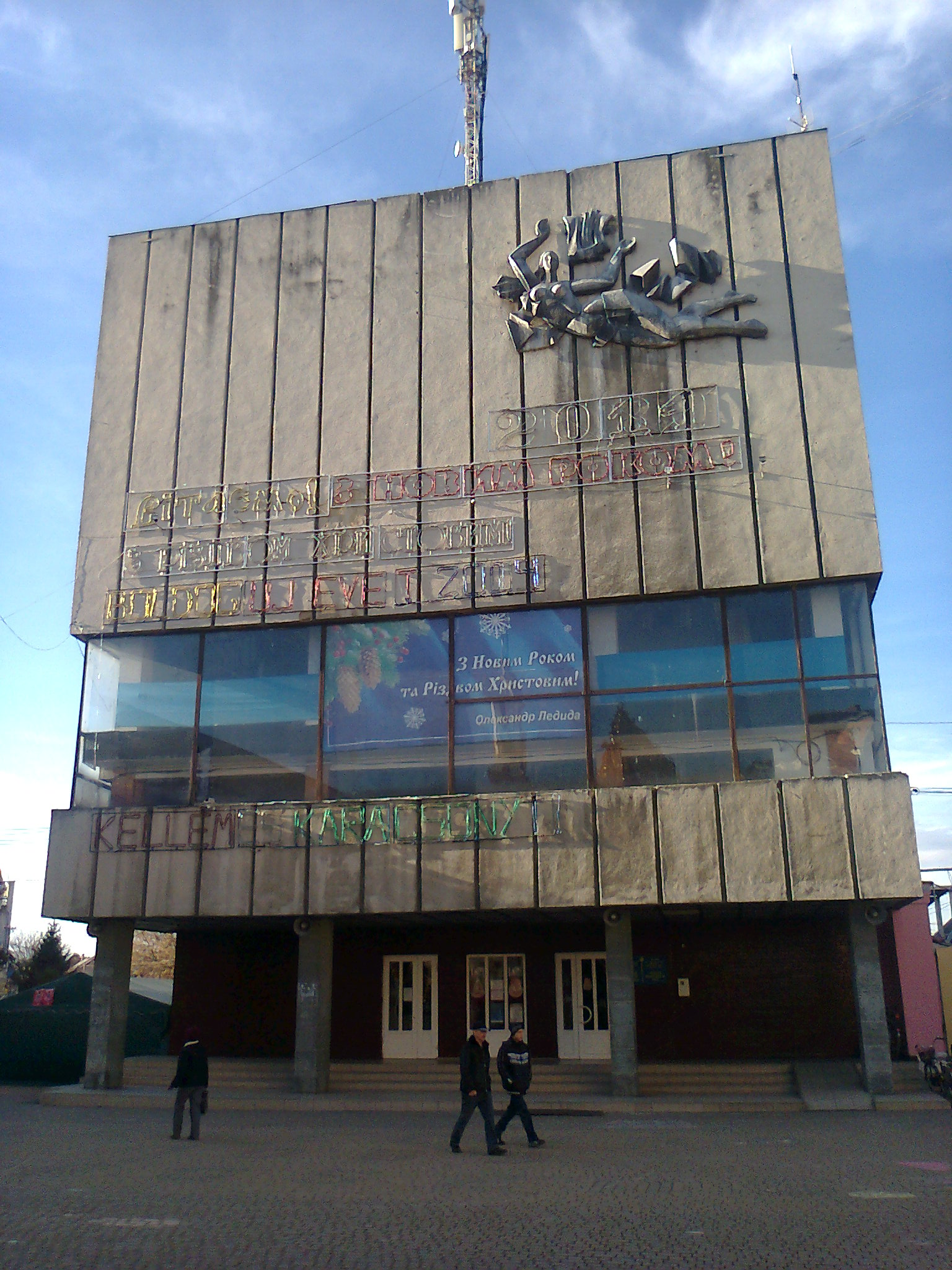
Former synagogue, with the shell

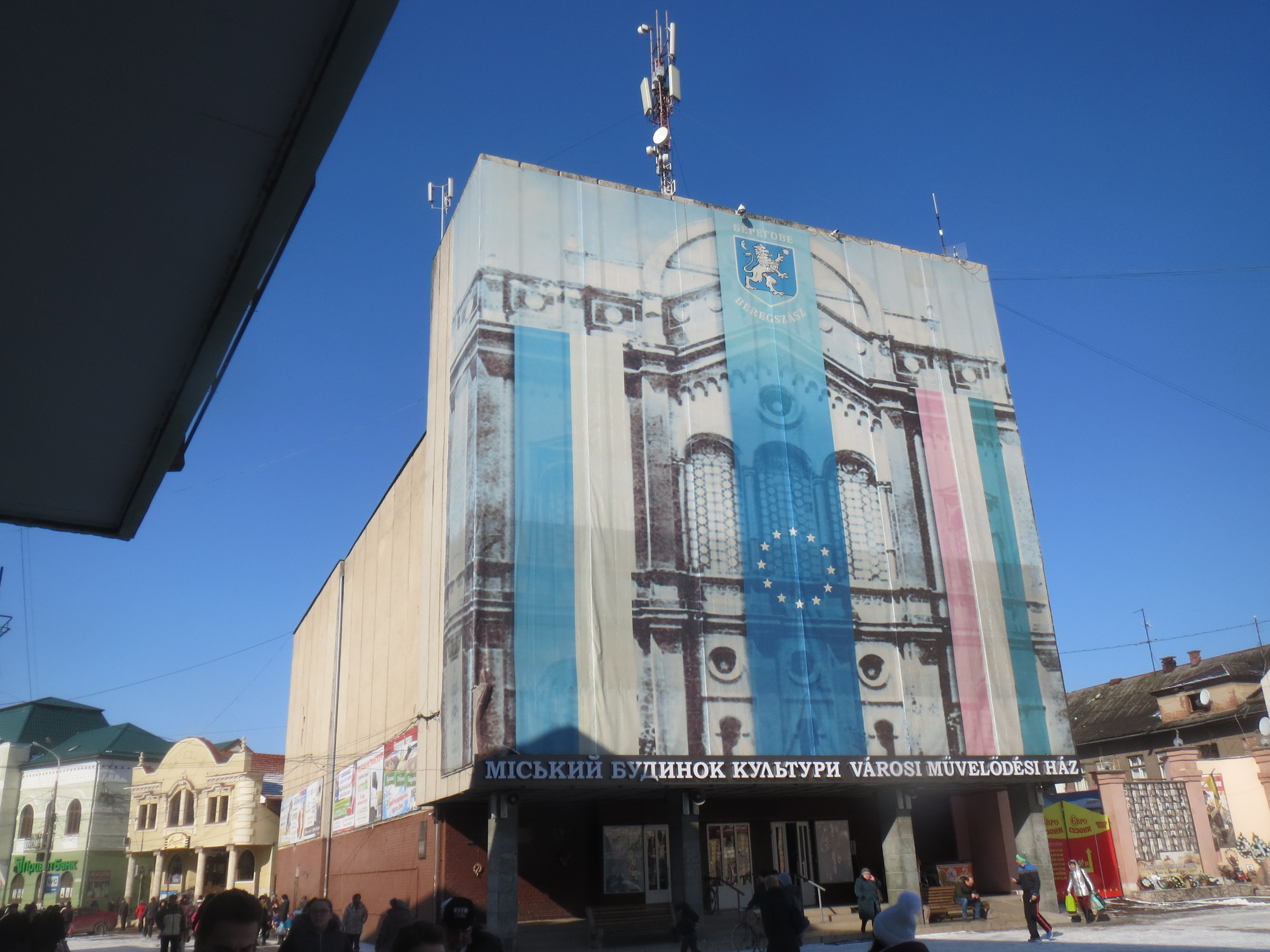
Former synagogue, with the shell, in 2018

== See also ==
- History of the Jews in Ukraine
- List of synagogues in Ukraine
