= Great Suburb Synagogue =

Former synagogue in Lviv, Ukraine

- Передміська синагога
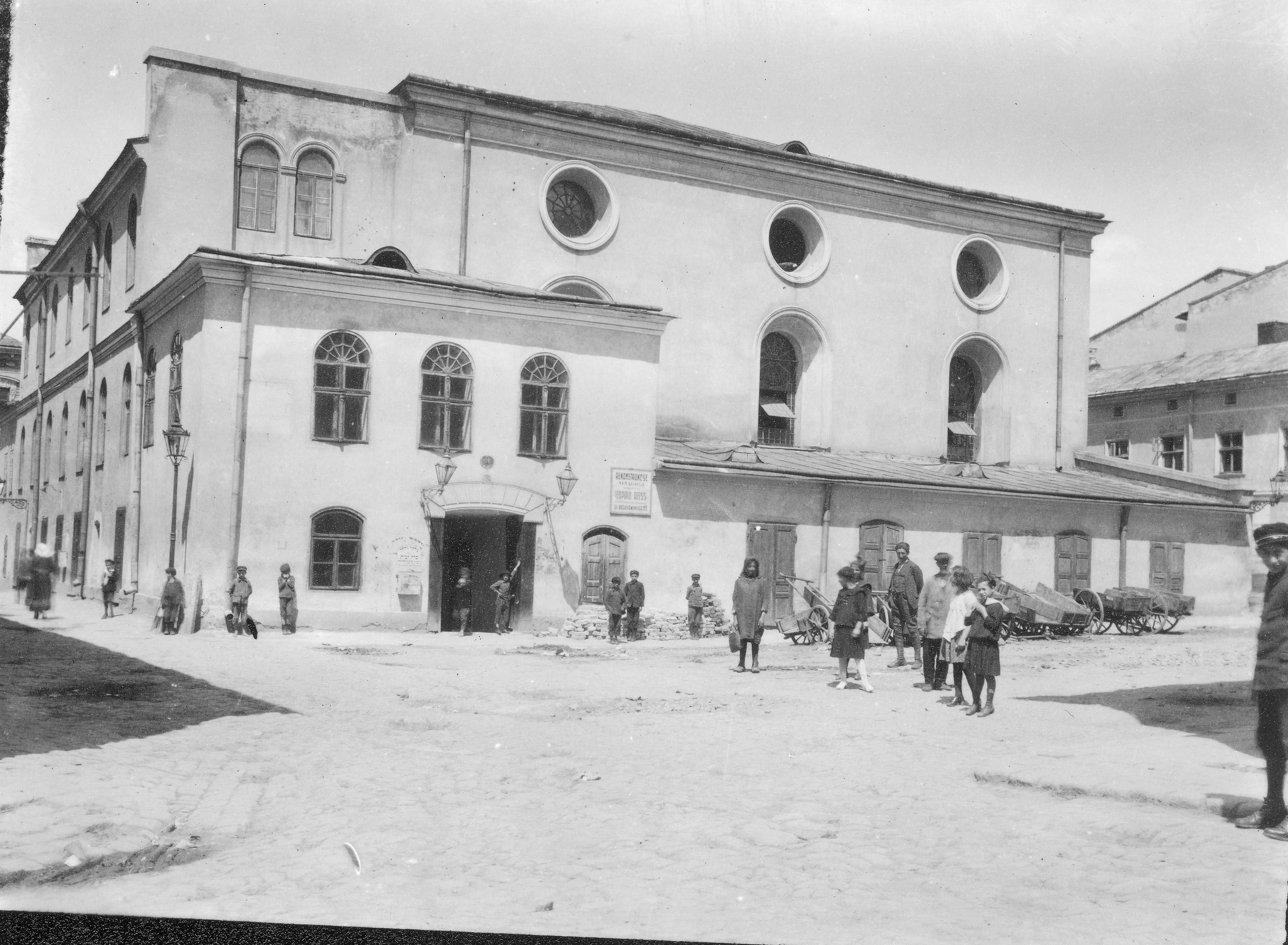
- The former synagogue, in 1921

- Location of the destroyed synagogue in Ukraine

Religion
- Status: Destroyed
- Religious features: Judaism (former)

Location
- Location: Bożnicza-Street 16, Lviv, Lviv Oblast
- Country: Ukraine
- Interactive map of Great Suburb Synagogue
- Coordinates: 49°50′53″N 23°58′52″E

Architecture
- Architects: unknown (1632); Józef Engel (1865); Michael Gerl (1871); Włodzimierz Pоdhorodecki (1914); Henryk Salver (1914); Leopold Reiss (1919)
- Type: Synagogue architecture
- Style: Baroque; Renaissance; Neoclassical
- General contractor: Ambroży Przychylny [attrib.] (1632)
- Completed: 1632 (men's prayer hall); 1635 (women's gallery)
- Destroyed: 14 August 1941
- Materials: Stone; brick

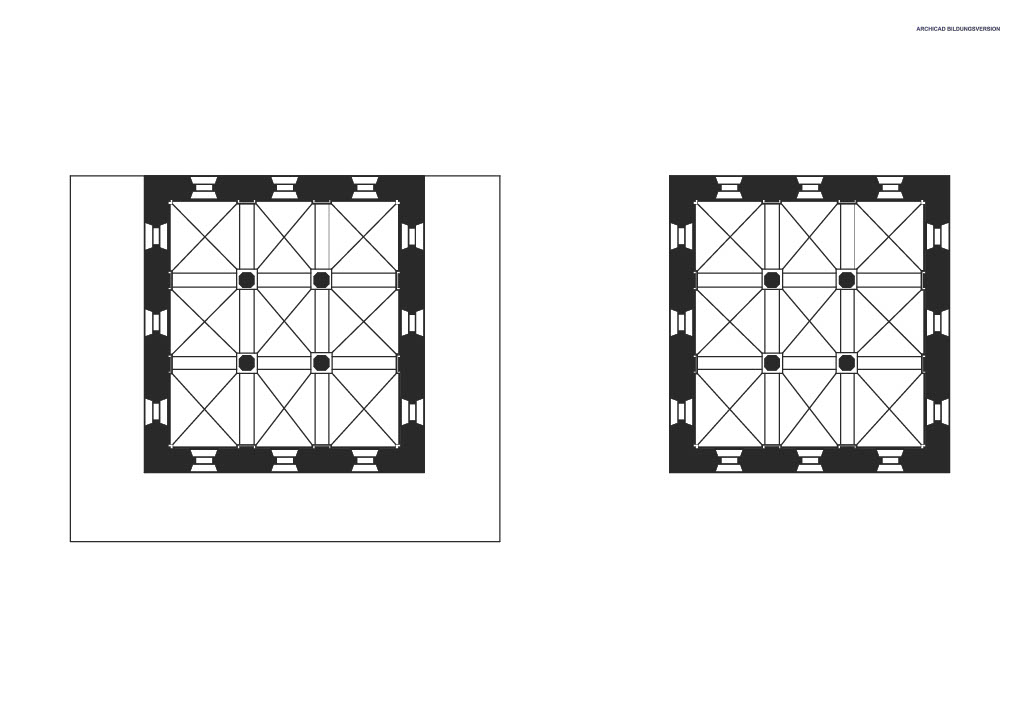
first and second floor

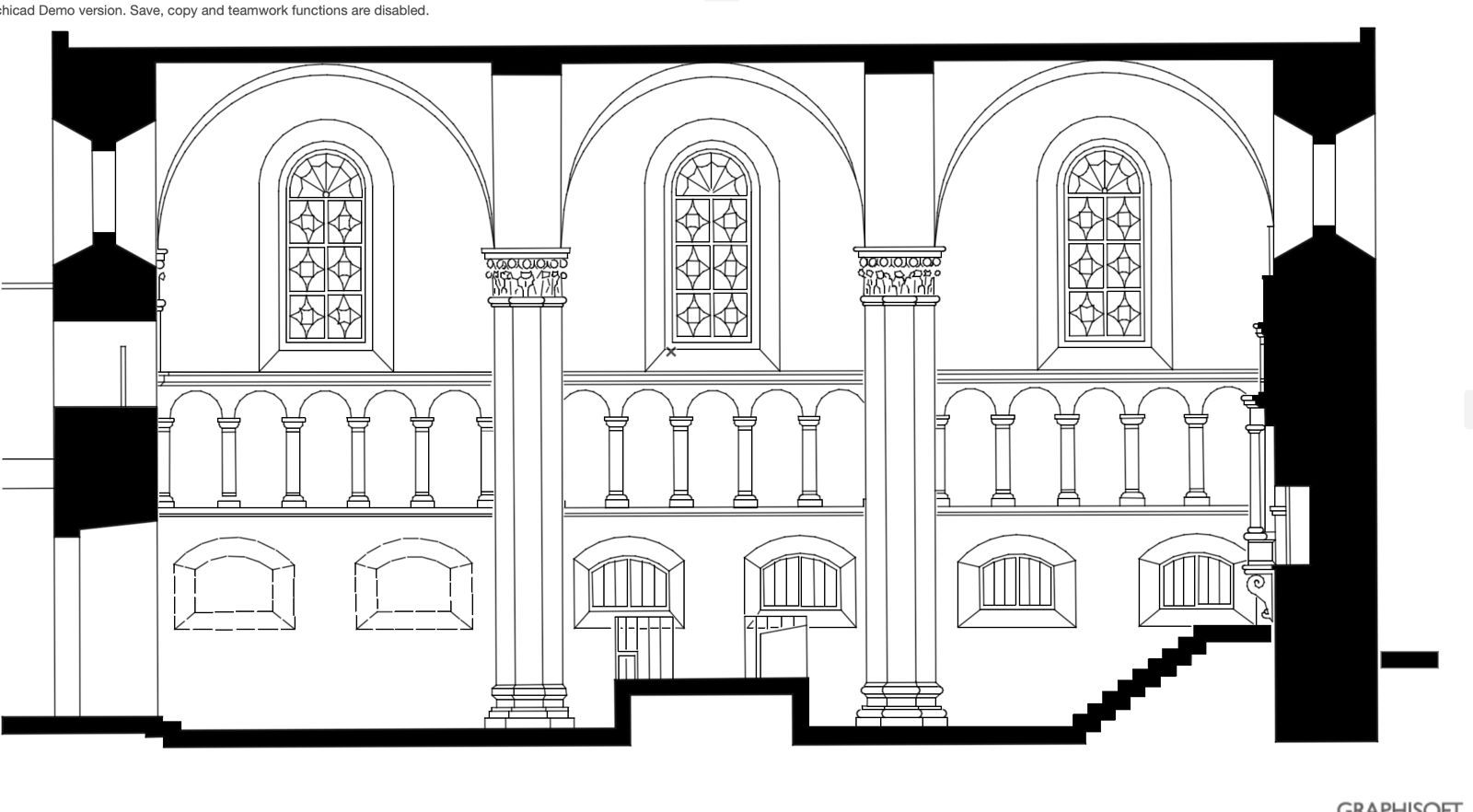
section of the prayer room

The Great Suburb Synagogue (Ukrainian: Передміська синагога, romanized: Peredmiska synahoha; Polish: Wielka Synagoga Przedmiejska we Lwowie) was a synagogue at Bożnicza-Street 16 in Lviv, in the Lviv Oblast of Ukraine. The synagogue was developed in stages, with the men's prayer hall completed in 1632, located in what was then the Polish–Lithuanian Commonwealth. The synagogue was destroyed by Nazi Germany in 1941 and the ruins dismantled during the late 1940s.

== History ==
A wooden synagogue was erected in the Krakivske suburb in the early 1600s; however was short-lived due to fires. Following a devastating fire on 10 July 1624 that destroyed the entire Kraków Suburb of Lwów, King Zygmunt III Waza ordered the Jewish community to demolish their existing synagogue and relocate. The royal decree permitted the Jews to acquire and build on empty plots between the Ziemnowodzki mill and the River Pełtew, with strict dimensional limits: the new synagogue was not to exceed 20 ells in height, 40 ells in width, and 38 ells in length, and was to be surrounded by a wall. A separate document records permission to build "in another place, namely in the valley of the Poznański Court. The Archbishop of Lwów simultaneously issued a warning against constructing a "conspicuous and costly masonry synagogue," demanding instead a "modest one of moderate dimensions." This episcopal demand was, however, effectively ignored: the completed hall was among the largest in the entire Polish–Lithuanian Commonwealth. Permission for the construction of a stone synagogue was granted by Sigismund III Vasa, the Roman Catholic King of Poland, in 1624.

== Construction ==
The initial construction of a men's prayer hall was completed in 1632, by Giacomo Medleni with its initial stonework attributed to Ambroży Przychylny, and a women's gallery was completed in 1635. For many years after its completion, the synagogue was the only masonry structure in the Kraków Suburb district, which gave it a secondary function as a refuge during riots, invasions, and the numerous sieges the city endured.

== Destruction and Rebuilding (17th–19th centuries) ==
The synagogue was destroyed by fire in 1648, together with the whole of the Kraków Suburb, during the siege of Lwów by Cossacks under Bohdan Chmielnicki. It was subsequently rebuilt, but pillaged and destroyed on several further occasions. The most substantial reconstruction and enlargement took place in the 18th and 19th centuries, as a result of which its external appearance was completely transformed, while the interior of the main hall remained relatively unaltered.

In the mid-18th century, the synagogue was covered with a Baroque-style high mansard roof. The roof was subsequently lowered and round windows added in 1871. Further improvements were completed in the first quarter of the 20th century including replacing wooden ceilings and beams, installing lighting, painting of the walls by the Fleck brothers, Eryk and Maurycy, and the plastering of the façade, interrupted by World War I and the Lwów pogrom of 1918.

== Destruction in World War II ==
The synagogue was burnt to destruction by the Nazis on 14 August 1941, during World War II, and was not rebuilt after the war. During Soviet occupation, the ruins of the synagogue were dismantled. The remains of its walls, reaching approximately one metre above surrounding ground level, were covered with earth to create an open square. A commemorative plaque was erected on a neighbouring building.

== Architecture ==
=== Main Hall — Dimensions and Structure ===
As documented in the floor plan drawn up by A. Grotte in 1910, the internal horizontal dimensions of the main hall closely adhered to those specified in King Zygmunt III's original permit. The external height above ground level also met the royal specification, though the internal height was effectively increased by lowering the floor by 1.20–1.30 m. The main hall was nine-field in plan, approximating a square, with internal dimensions of 20.10 m × 19.40 m, the longer axis running east–west. The vault reached a maximum height of 10.60 m. In terms of size, the hall was surpassed among contemporaneous Polish synagogues only by the Great (Wielka) Synagogue in Wilno; comparable halls were those later built in Ostróg, Pińsk, and Żółkiew.

As the building evolved, the architectural style changed from Baroque to Renaissance, and then Neoclassical. The placement of the Bimah in the middle of the prayer hall became the prototype of many subsequent Jewish temples of significant size. Also unique was a gallery for students of the Beit Midrash and Talmud-Torah schools. Piers and Vaulting

Four octagonal piers with Doric capitals — characteristic of Lwów architecture around the turn of the 16th and 17th centuries — were connected by buttresses to wall-pilasters with similar capitals. These divided the hall into approximately equal square fields. The entire hall was covered by cross-vaulting stretched between the buttresses, all at the same height.

Following the rebuilding after the 1648 fire, the architectural divisions of the internal walls were altered. Only the upper parts of the pilasters (above the window-parapets) were retained. An arcade-frieze was added below these parapets on the north, east, and south walls. The walls below the frieze, together with the west wall, were left smooth, without pilasters.

=== Windows and Lighting ===
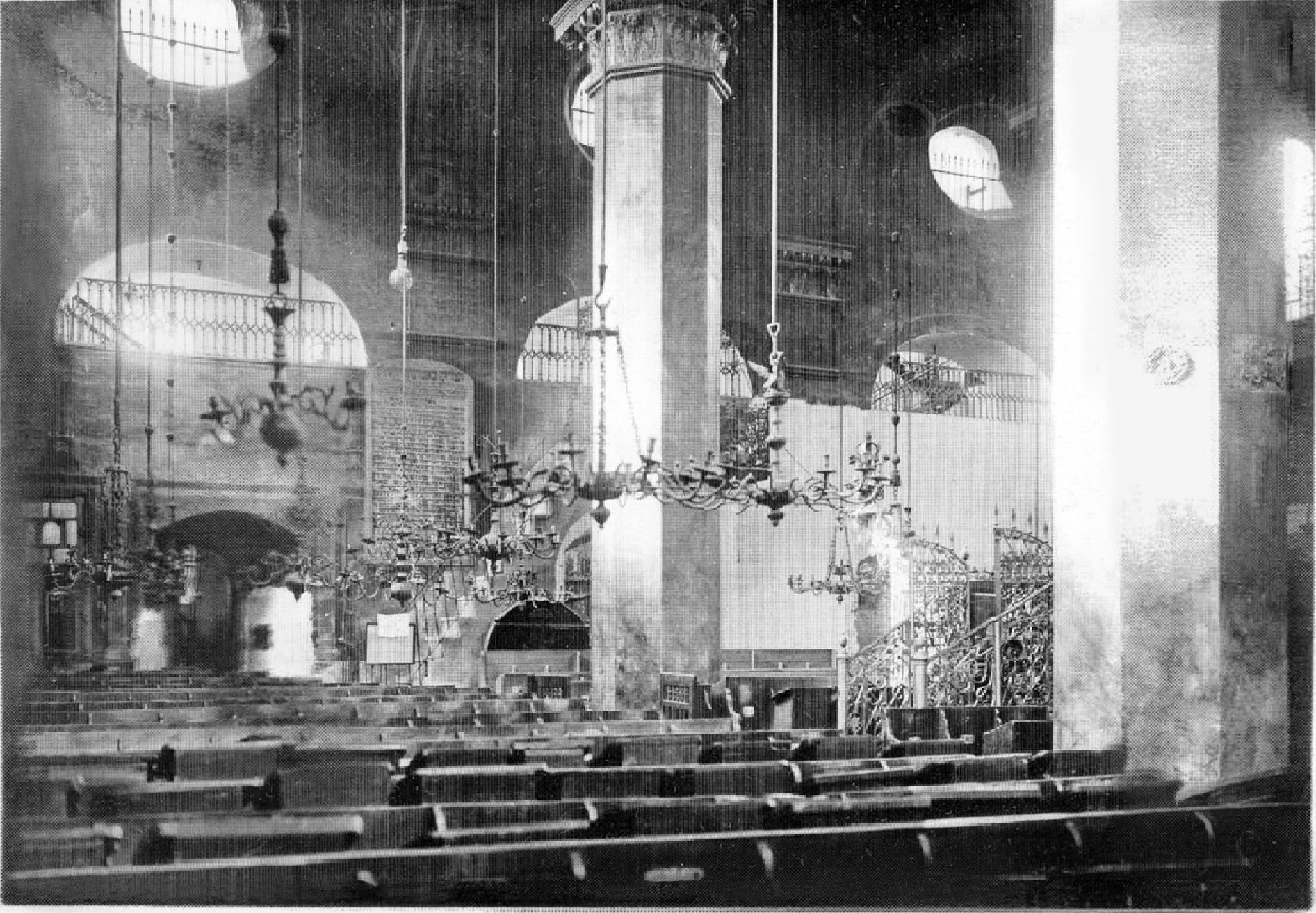
Wielka Synagoga Przedmiejska 1

Twelve windows originally illuminated the interior, positioned high up on the axes of the bays, three on each of the four walls. The window on the eastern axis above the Holy Ark, as well as the window in the west wall (originally located above the roof of the single-storey vestibule), was round; the remaining ten were tall with round-headed arches. In the side walls, below the frieze, there were additional windows connecting the hall with the women's prayer-room.

Three large semicircular openings were later cut into the west wall above the entrance, linking the prayer hall with a gallery added above the vestibule in the 18th or 19th century. A gallery for the cheder was constructed internally beneath these windows, accessed by narrow stone steps.

The building was decorated with round windows, made on elongated semicircular axes; they lit a large prayer hall and the second tiers of the women's galleries.

=== Overall Layout and Annexes ===
The plan and cross-section drawn by A. Grotte in 1910 depict the full complex as it then existed: a main hall preceded by a vestibule with a gallery on the upper storey, narrow women's galleries abutting the south and north walls, and two-storey pavilions containing guild-synagogues added to the south-west and north-west corners. The arrangement was strictly symmetrical and represented the most architecturally developed layout among all known Polish synagogues of the 17th century.

A series of smaller prayer houses were attached to the synagogue, in the mode of separate chapels, including those belonging to the guilds of tailors and butchers, prayer rooms of brotherhoods, Talmudic schools and others, including "Hayutim Gedolim", "Menakrem", "Melamdim", "Nosey Katov", and "Sovhe Tzedek.

Whether the low vaulted annexes (vestibule and women's room) were built simultaneously with the main hall or added later is not definitively known. The original roof form is also unknown, though by analogy with other 17th-century synagogues it was likely a multi-slope roof concealed by an attic.

== Interior Furnishings ==
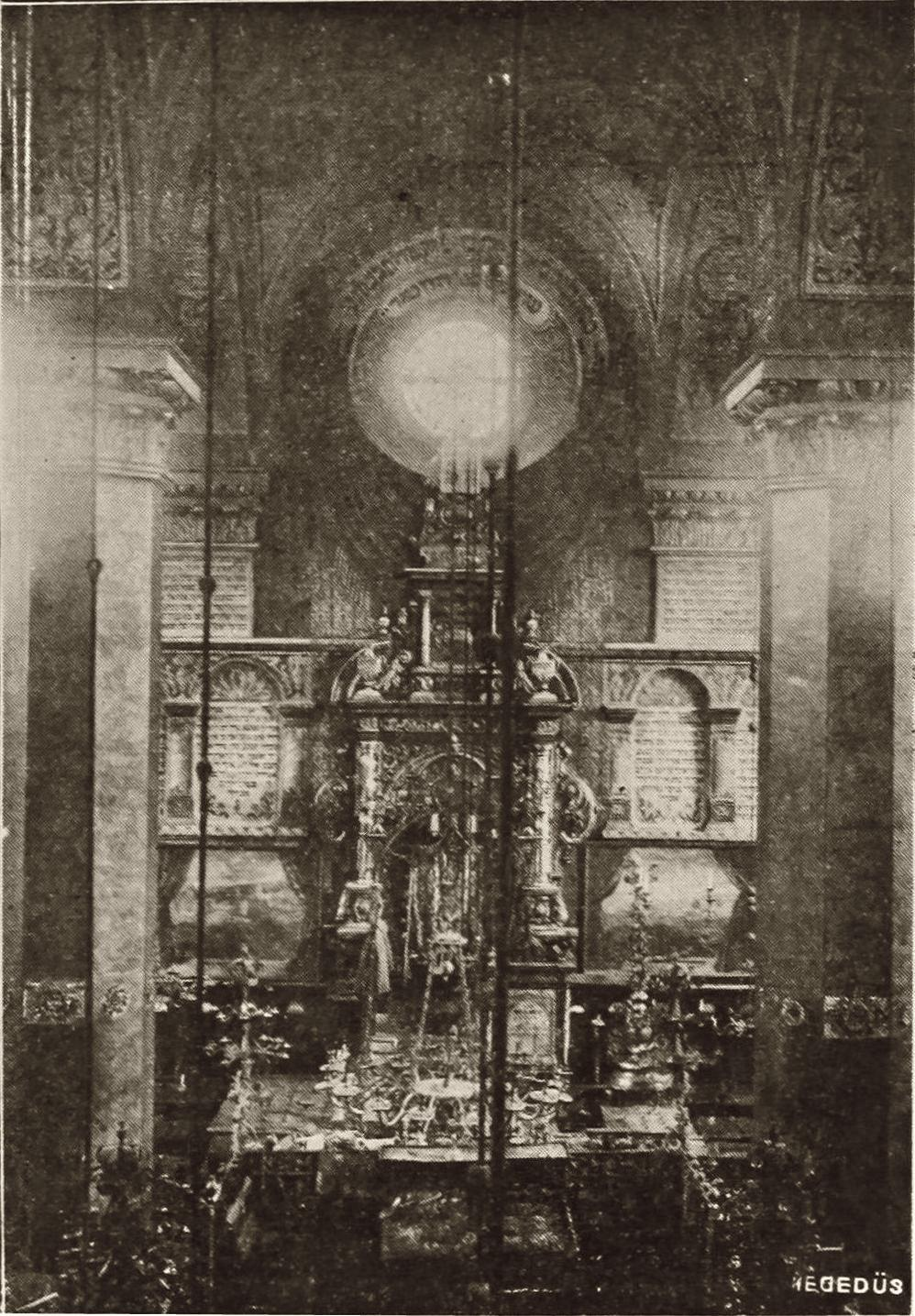
Lemberg (Lwow), Great Suburban synagogue

The interior furnishings — including the Holy Ark and the bimah — were destroyed on several occasions. According to historian M. Bałaban, the furnishings that survived into the Second World War dated from the 18th century, a dating supported by surviving photographs, though few in number and of poor quality.

The Holy Ark was situated against the background of the arcaded frieze, flanked by two slender columns on double bases, topped by vases above their cornices. Between the columns rose a narrow, tall superstructure reaching up to the oculus window. The bimah stood in the central field between the piers, with a square-plan podium surrounded by a wrought-iron balustrade, and may date from the 19th century.

In the prayer hall interior, two tiers of the southern women's galleries have survived.

== Appearance in Historical Panoramas ==
The tall cubic mass of the main hall, covered by a two-storey pyramidal roof, appears in a panorama of Lwów engraved between 1772 and 1780 by François Perneur, dedicated to Empress Maria Theresa. A similar depiction appears in the panorama by Johann Christoph Haffner (engraved by Ebrescuel) in 1772. In the 18th century, the original sunken roof was likely replaced by a hipped roof for easier maintenance. In the 19th century, the external walls of the main hall were heightened to create an attic, a third storey was added above the vestibule, and the high shingle-covered roof was replaced by a low-pitched tin roof. Round windows illuminating the attic were inserted above the hall windows.

== See also ==
- History of the Jews in Ukraine
- List of synagogues in Ukraine
