= Averbuch =

Averbuch is a surname. Notable people with the surname include:

- Ilan Averbuch (born 1953), Israeli sculptor
- Genia Averbuch (1909–1977), Israeli architect
- Lazarus Averbuch (1889–1908) Russian immigrant to Chicago who was shot and killed by the Chicago Chief of Police
- Yael Averbuch West (born 1986), American former professional soccer player
