= Great City Synagogue (Lviv) =

Former synagogue in Lviv, Ukraine

- Ukrainian: Велика міська синагога
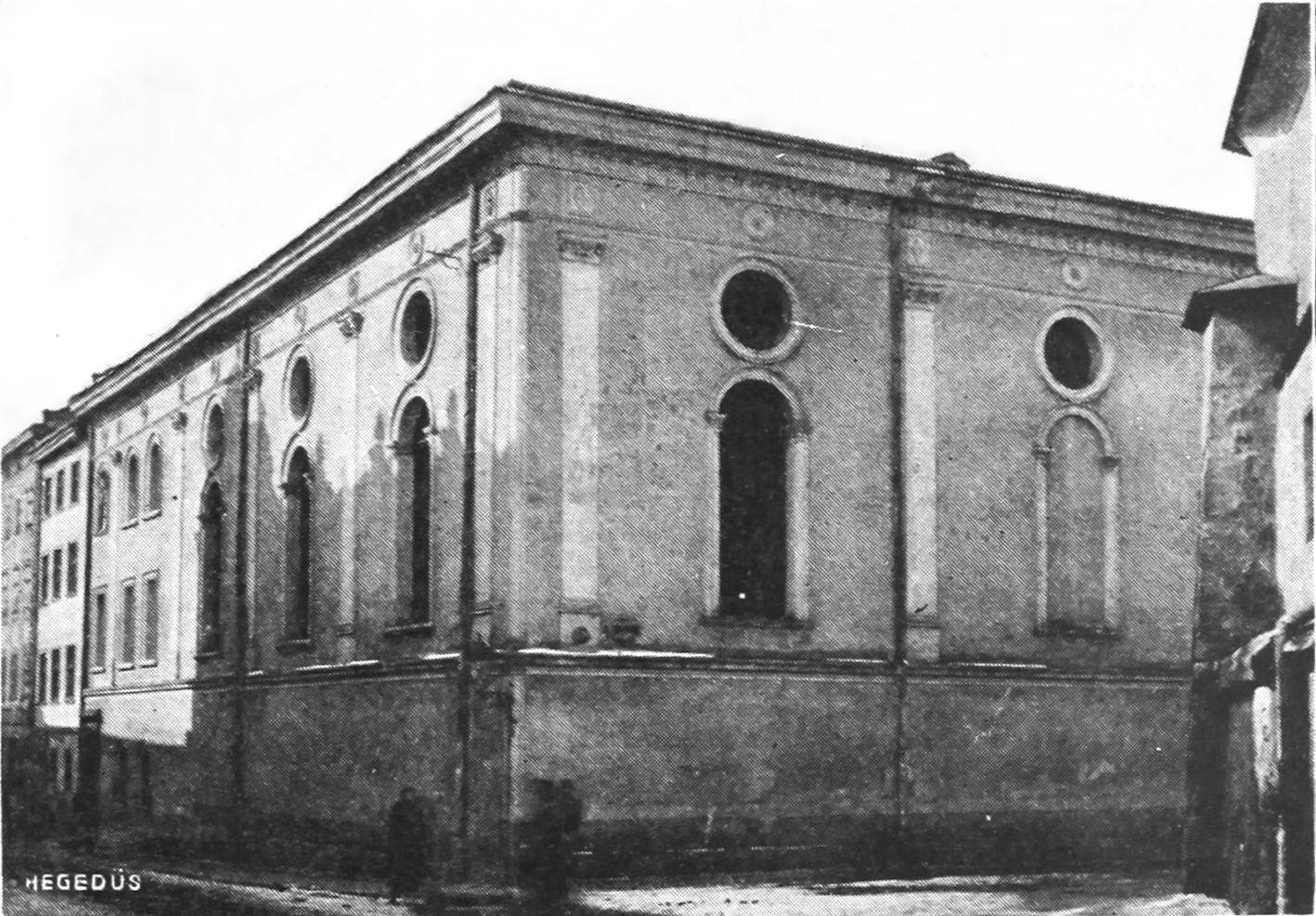
- The former synagogue, c. 1900

- Location of the destroyed synagogue in Ukraine

Religion
- Affiliation: Orthodox Judaism (former)
- Ecclesiastical or organisational status: Synagogue (1801–1943)
- Status: Destroyed

Location
- Location: Staroyevreiska Street, Lviv, Lviv Oblast
- Country: Ukraine
- Coordinates: 49°50′28″N 24°02′06″E

Architecture
- Type: Synagogue architecture
- Style: Neoclassical
- Established: 1320s (as a congregation)
- Completed: 1801
- Destroyed: 14 August 1941

The Great City Synagogue (Ukrainian: Велика міська синагога, romanized: Velyka miska synahoha, Polish: Wielka Synagoga Miejska we Lwowie) was a former Orthodox Jewish synagogue in the city of Lviv (Polish: Lwów, German: Lemberg), in what is now the Lviv Oblast of Ukraine. It was situated in the former Jewish Quarter near today's city centre.

== History ==
=== Earlier synagogues ===
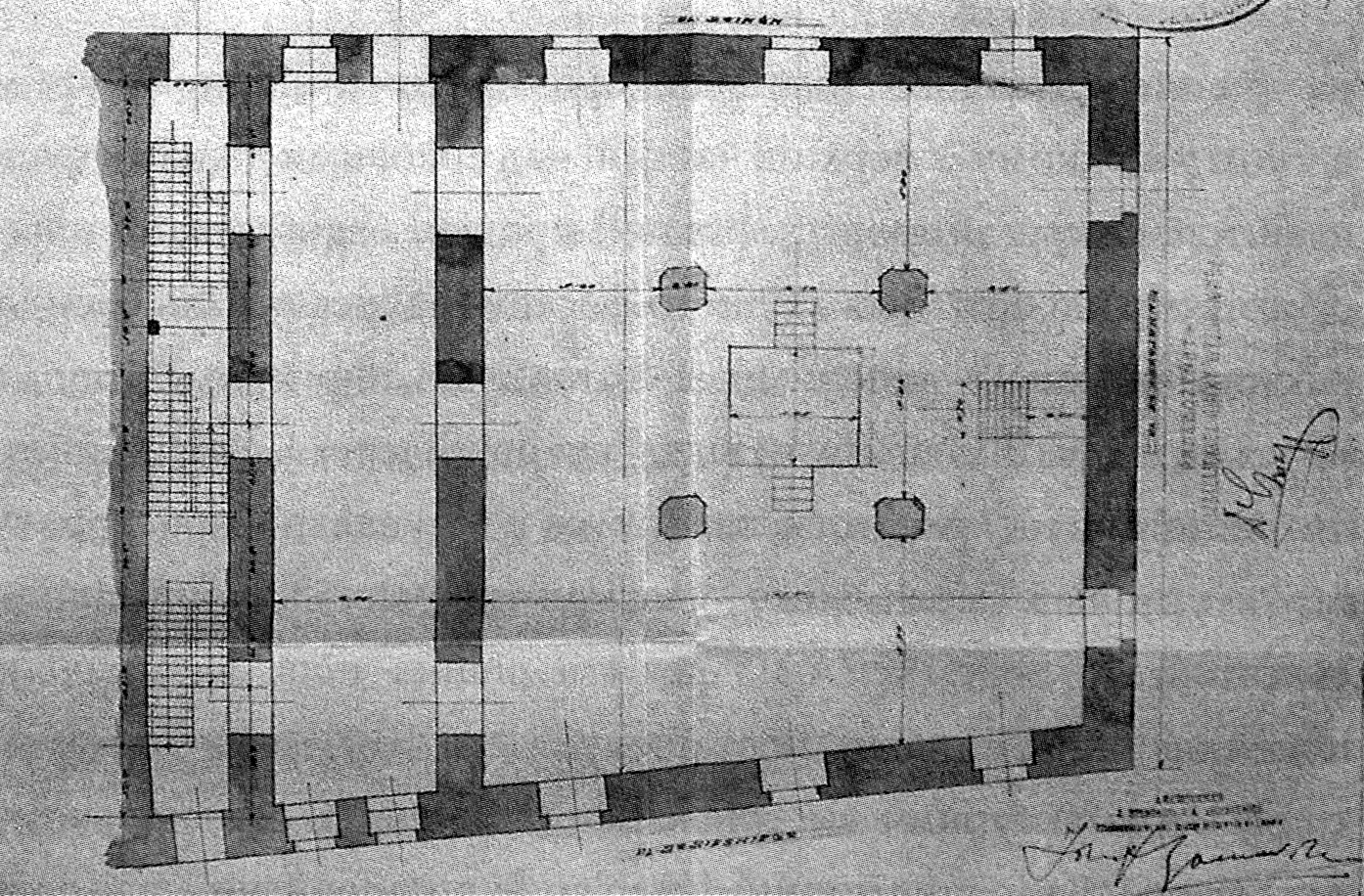
Interior of the synagogue

The first synagogue in Lviv, in what was then the Kingdom of Galicia–Volhynia, was situated nearby in 29 Feodorova Street. It was a wooden synagogue building that was built around 1320. On 15 June 1527 a catastrophic fire destroyed parts of the city including the synagogue. A new brick synagogue in the Gothic style was constructed on 54 Staroyevreiska Street in 1555. It served as the Great City Synagogue until 1603; the building was demolished in 1797 due to its small size.

In 1603, the role of the Great City Synagogue shifted to the Golden Rose Synagogue. When this synagogue also became too small, the Jewish community began to construct a new, considerably bigger, synagogue on the site of the disassembled old synagogue.

=== New building ===
A new rectangular Neoclassical synagogue was built between 1799 and 1801. After the Jewish community transferred the ritual objects from the Golden Rose Synagogue to the newly constructed synagogue in 1801, the latter became the main city synagogue. A single-storey Beit Midrash adjoined the synagogue. In 1878 the shingles on the roof of the synagogue were replaced with tin. The staircase was reconstructed and a new stairway was added, leading to the women's prayer room on the gallery, completed in 1910.

During World War II, on 14 August 1941, the German Nazis burned the synagogue. The following year, the ruins were destroyed.

== Memorial ==
In 2010, a joint initiative of the L’viv City Council, the L’viv Center for Urban History, and the German Society for International Cooperation announced plans to commemorate the sites of the former Great City Synagogue, the former Golden Rose Synagogue, remnants of the Old Jewish Cemetery, and the site of the Janowska concentration camp. After a design competition, the first stage was opened in 2016 featuring landscape designs by Franz Reschke, with additional stages planned.

== See also ==
- History of the Jews in Ukraine
- List of synagogues in Ukraine
