= Mikhail Averbakh =

Russian ophthalmologist (1872-1944)

Mikhail Iosifovich Averbakh
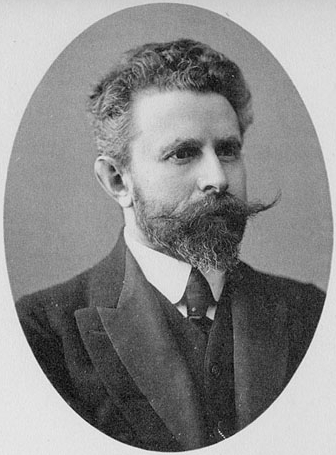
- Mikhail Averbakh
- Born: May 29, 1872; Mariupol, Ekaterinoslav Governorate, Russian Empire
- Died: July 29, 1944 (aged 72); Moscow, USSR
- Education: Imperial Moscow University
- Known for: founder and first director of the Helmholtz Central Institute of Ophthalmology
- Medical career
- Institutions: Helmholtz Central Institute of Ophthalmology, Second Moscow Medical Institute, Central Advanced Training Institute for Physicians
- Sub-specialties: Ophthalmology
- Awards: Order of Lenin (1935); Stalin Prize (1943); Honoured Scientist of the RSFSR (1933)

Mikhail Iosifovich Averbakh (Russian: Михаи́л Ио́сифович Аверба́х) was a Russian and Soviet ophthalmologist, Doctor of Medicine (1900), Full Member of the Academy of Sciences of the USSR (1939), founder and first director of the Helmholtz Central Institute of Ophthalmology.

== Biography ==
Mikhail Averbakh was born 29 May 1872 in Mariupol in a wealthy Jewish family. His father was Iosif I. Averbakh (Auerbach) (? - 1882), second-guild merchant and one of the founders of the second synagogue in Mariupol.

Till 1890 Mikhail Averbakh attended the Alexandrovskaya Gimnasium in Mariupol, which he left with a silver medal. In the same year he was admitted to the Imperial Moscow University, where he studied at the Faculty of Medicine. Among his lecturers were Ivan Sechenov, Alexander Stoletov, Friedrich Erismann and Nikolai Sklifosovsky, but it was an ophthalmologist Professor Adrian Kriukov (1849 – 1908) who had played a special role in Averbakh's professional formation.

Graduated from the university in 1895, Averbakh started working at the university's eye clinic, where in 1900 he was awarded with the degree of Doctor of Medicine. His thesis was titled «On the anaclastics of eyes of different diffraction». In 1900 the young ophthalmologist was invited as assistant physician to the newly opened Alexeyevskaya Eye Clinic in Moscow.

In 1904 — 1911 Mikhail Averbakh was a privatdozent of the Imperial Moscow University, which he left with a group of professors as a protest against Minister Kasso's higher-education policy.

In 1903 Mikhail Averbakh was elected director of the Alexeyevskaya Eye Clinic. Under his direction the Alexeyevskaya Eye Clinic (Helmholtz Eye Clinic since 1923) became the main ophthalmology center of the USSR. In 1935 it was transformed in the Helmholtz Central Institute of Ophthalmology, that combined medical practice with wide scientific activity. Averbakh headed it till the end of his life.

Mikhail Averbakh was also chairman of the departments of eye diseases of the Second Moscow Medical Institute and the Central Advanced Training Institute for Physicians. In 1936 he was elected president of the Scientific Association of Ophthalmologists of the USSR, created by the 2nd All-Union Ophthalmology Congress.

Mikhail Averbakh's works were devoted to various optical refractions, traumas, and such problems as blindness, glaucoma, and trachoma. He developed and introduced a series of new eye operations.

In 1933 Mikhail Averbakh was given a title of Honoured Scientist of the RSFSR. In 1935 he was awarded with the Order of Lenin. In 1939 Avrebakh was elected Full Member of the Academy of Sciences of the USSR. His works during the Second World War were awarded with the Stalin Prize of 1st degree, which the scientist donated to finance the needs of the Red Army.

Mikhail Iosifovich Averbakh died in Moscow on 29 July 1944. He was buried at the Vvedenskoye Cemetery.

== Awards ==
- Order of Lenin (1935)
- Stalin Prize, 1st degree (1943)

== Memory ==
29 June 1952 a monument to Mikhail Averbakh by sculptor Sergey Merkurov was opened near the buildings of the Helmholtz Central Institute of Ophthalmology.

A special Averbakh Prize for works in ophthalmology was established by the Academy of Medical Sciences of the USSR.

== Selected bibliography ==
- (in Russian) Авербах М. И. К вопросу о кривизне передней поверхности роговицы: сообщено в заседании Моск. офтальм. кружка 24 марта 1898 г. / (Из Моск. глаз. клиники); [Соч.] М. Авербаха – М. : Т-во тип. А.И. Мамонтова, 1898 - 12 с.
- (in Russian) Авербах М. И. Изменения роговичного астигматизма под влиянием операций на прямых мышцах / [Соч.] М. Авербаха; (Из Глаз. клиники Моск. Ун-та) – М.: Т-во тип. А.И. Мамонтова, 1899 - 12 с.
- (in Russian) Авербах М. И. К диоптрике глаз различных рефракций: дис. на степ. д-ра мед. Михаила Авербаха – М.: Тип. и словолитня О.О. Гербек, 1900 - 338 с.
- (in Russian) Авербах М. И. Офтальмологические очерки / акад. М. И. Авербах; Центр. ин-т офтальмологии им. Гельмгольца - Москва; Ленинград: Медгиз, 1940 - 456 с.
- (in Russian) Авербах М. И. Главнейшие формы изменений зрительного нерва / М. И. Авербах - Москва: Медгиз, 1944 - 125 с.
- (in Russian) Авербах М. И. Повреждения глаз и окружающих их частей / М. И. Авербах – Москва; Ленинград: Изд-во Акад. наук СССР, 1945 - 87 с.
- (in Russian) Авербах М. И. "Об одностороннем проведении импульсов в альтерированном нерве" / М. И. Авербах - [Б. м.] : [б. и.], 1947 - 3 с.
- (in Russian) Авербах М. И. Офтальмологические очерки / М. И. Авербах – М.: Медгиз, 1949 - 788 с.
