= Great Synagogue =

Great Synagogue or Grand Synagogue may refer to current or former synagogues in the following countries:

== Algeria ==
=== Former synagogues ===
- Great Synagogue of Algiers, converted into a mosque in 1962
- Great Synagogue (Oran), converted into a mosque in 1975

== Australia ==
- Great Synagogue (Sydney), opened in 1878

== Belarus ==
- Great Synagogue (Grodno)
- Great Synagogue (Stolin)

== Belgium ==
- Great Synagogue of Europe, built Brussels in 1878, dedicated as the Synagogue of Europe in 2008

== Cyprus ==
- Great Synagogue of Cyprus

== Czech Republic ==
- Great Synagogue (Plzeň), the world's fourth largest synagogue

== Denmark ==
- Great Synagogue (Copenhagen)

== Estonia ==
=== Former ===
- Great Synagogue of Tallinn, destroyed during the bombing of Tallinn in 1944

== France ==
- Great Synagogue of Bordeaux
- Great Synagogue of Lyon
- Great Synagogue of Marseille
- Grand Synagogue of Paris

== Germany ==
=== Former synagogues ===
- Grand Synagogue of Nuremberg, destroyed by the Nazis in 1938

== Georgia ==
- Great Synagogue (Tbilisi)

== Hungary ==
- Dohány Street Synagogue the Great Synagogue (Nagy Zsinagóga) of Budapest, Europe's largest and the world's fourth largest synagogue.
- Great Synagogue of Miskolc
- Great Synagogue of Szeged

== Israel ==
- Ades Synagogue, in Jerusalem, also known as the Great Synagogue Ades of the Glorious Aleppo Community
- Belz Great Synagogue, in Jerusalem, the second-largest synagogue in the world
- Jerusalem Great Synagogue, completed in 1982
- Great Synagogue (Petah Tikva), completed in 1900
- Great Synagogue (Tel Aviv), opened in 1926
- Western Wall completed in 19 BC

== Italy ==
- Great Synagogue (Florence)
- Great Synagogue of Livorno
- Great Italian Synagogue in Padua
- Great Synagogue (Rome), the largest synagogue in Rome
- Great Synagogue (Trieste)

=== Former synagogues ===
- Great German Synagogue of Venice, Jewish museum since 2017

== Latvia ==
=== Former ===
- Great Choral Synagogue (Riga), burned in 1941

== Lithuania ==
- Great Synagogue (Vilna), destroyed during and after World War II

== Netherlands ==
- Great Synagogue (Deventer)

== Poland ==
- Great Synagogue (Piotrków Trybunalski)

=== Former synagogues ===
- Great Synagogue (Białystok), destroyed in 1941
- Great Synagogue (Danzig), destroyed in 1939
- Great Synagogue (Jasło), destroyed during World War lI
- Great Synagogue (Katowice), destroyed in 1939
- Great Synagogue (Łódź), destroyed in 1939
- Great Synagogue (Łomża), destroyed during World War II
- Great Synagogue (Oświęcim), destroyed in 1939
- Great Synagogue (Warsaw), destroyed in 1943 after the Warsaw Ghetto Uprising
- Great Synagogue of Zamość, closed in 1939, profane use 1929–1960s, Jewish museum since 2005

== Romania ==
- Great Synagogue (Bucharest)
- Great Synagogue (Iaşi)

=== Former synagogues ===
- Great Synagogue (Constanța), disused

== Russia ==
- Grand Choral Synagogue (Saint Petersburg)

== South Africa ==
- Great Park Synagogue (Johannesburg)

== Sweden ==
- Great Synagogue of Stockholm

== Tunisia ==
- Grand Synagogue of Tunis

== Turkey ==
- Grand Synagogue of Edirne

=== Former synagogues ===
- Great Synagogue of Gaziantep

== Ukraine ==
- Great Choral Synagogue (Kyiv)
- Great Synagogue (Sataniv)
- Great Synagogue (Sharhorod)
- Great Synagogue (Zhovkva)
- Choral Synagogue (Drohobych) (also called the Great Synagogue)
- Great Synagogue (Izyaslav)

=== Former synagogues ===
- Great Synagogue (Berehove), abandoned and repurposed
- Great Synagogue (Bila Tserkva), abandoned and repurposed
- Great Synagogue (Brody), abandoned
- Great Synagogue (Husiatyn), abandoned
- Great Synagogue (Lutsk), abandoned and repurposed
- Great Maharsha Synagogue, destroyed by the Nazis in 1941, partially restored
- Great City Synagogue (Lviv), destroyed
- Great Suburb Synagogue, Lviv, destroyed
- Great Synagogue (Pidhaitsi), demolished
- Great Synagogue (Velyki Mosty), abandoned

== United Kingdom ==
- Spitalfields Great Synagogue
- Great Synagogue (Gibraltar), oldest synagogue on the Iberian Peninsula

=== Former synagogues ===
- Great Synagogue of London, destroyed by aerial bombing in the London Blitz in 1941
- Fieldgate Street Great Synagogue, converted into a mosque in 2015

== Yemen ==
=== Former synagogues ===
Grand Synagogue of Aden, abandoned during the 1947 anti-Jewish riots and destroyed in 1994

== Museums ==
- The historical Great Synagogue in Amsterdam, now part of the Joods Historisch Museum (Jewish History Museum);
- The Jewish Museum of Rome, established in 1960, is located in the basement of the Great Synagogue of Rome;
- Great German Synagogue of Venice, Jewish museum since 2017;
- The Great Synagogue Memorial Park, a memorial park devoted to the Great Synagogue (Oświęcim), destroyed in 1939;
- Włodawa Great Synagogue, built between 1769 and 1774, now a museum complex in Poland;
- Great Synagogue of Zamość, a Jewish museum since 2005.

== Synagogues in antiquity ==
- Great Assembly, or Anshei Knesset HaGedolah, sometimes referred to as the Great Synagogue, of Temple times.
- Great Synagogue of Baghdad, an ancient building in present-day Iraq
- Sardis Synagogue, Manisa, Turkey - The complex destroyed in AD 616 by the Sassanian-Persians.

== See also ==
- New Synagogue (disambiguation)
- Old Synagogue (disambiguation)
