= New Synagogue =

New Synagogue may refer to:

== China ==
- New Synagogue (Harbin)
- New Synagogue (Shanghai)

== France ==
- New Synagogue (Strasbourg)

== Germany ==
- New Synagogue (Berlin)
- New Synagogue (Darmstadt)
- New Synagogue (Dresden)
- New Synagogue (Düsseldorf)
- New Synagogue (Mainz)

== Poland ==
- New Synagogue (Gliwice)
- New Synagogue (Opole)
- New Synagogue (Ostrów Wielkopolski)
- New Synagogue (Przemyśl)
- New Synagogue (Tarnów)
- New Synagogue (Wrocław)

== Slovakia ==
- New Orthodox Synagogue (Košice)
- New Synagogue (Žilina)

== United Kingdom ==
- New Synagogue (Leeds)
- New West End Synagogue, London

== See also ==
- Great Synagogue (disambiguation)
- Old New Synagogue in Prague, Czech Republic
- Old Synagogue (disambiguation)
