= Old Synagogue =

Old Synagogue (also Alte Synagoge (de), Alta Shul (yi), Synagoga Stara (pl)) can refer to:

- Old Synagogue (Berlin), Germany
- Old Synagogue (Canterbury), England
- Old Synagogue (Dortmund), Germany
- Old Synagogue (Dubrovnik), Croatia
- Old Synagogue (Erfurt), Germany
- Old Synagogue (Essen), Germany
- Old Synagogue (Heilbronn), Germany
- Old Synagogue (Kraków), Poland
- Old Synagogue (Prague), also called the Spanish Synagogue, Czech Republic
- Old Synagogue (Przemyśl), Poland

== See also ==
- Great Synagogue (disambiguation)
- New Synagogue (disambiguation)
- Old New Synagogue, Prague, Czech Republic
