= Oświęcim Treasure =

Archaeological dig in Oświęcim, Poland

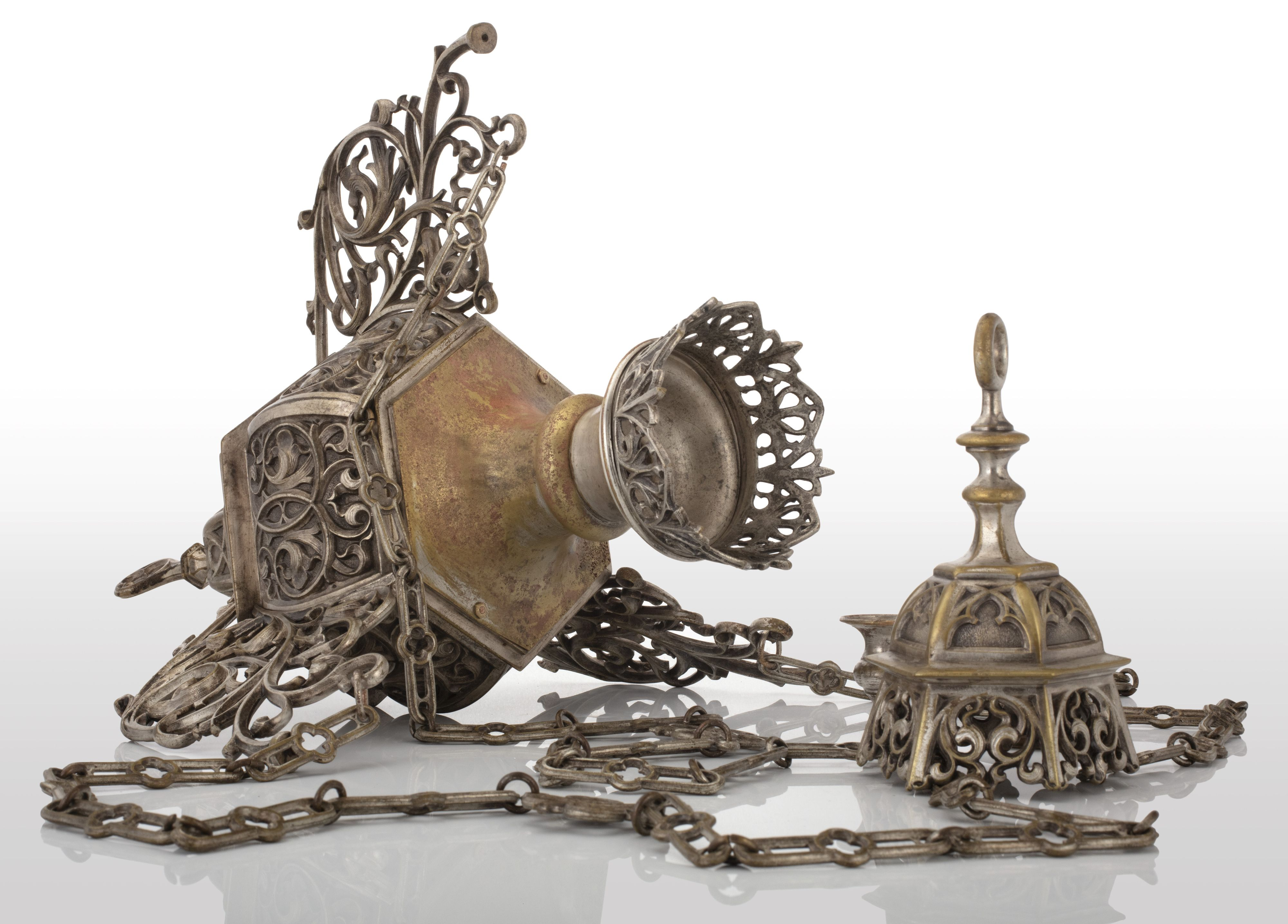
One of the 400 excavated items

The Oświęcim Treasure is an archaeological discovery of about 400 items from the Great Synagogue in Oświęcim, discovered in 2004 by a team of archaeologists led by Małgorzata Grupa from the Nicolaus Copernicus University in Toruń.

== The genesis of the discovery ==
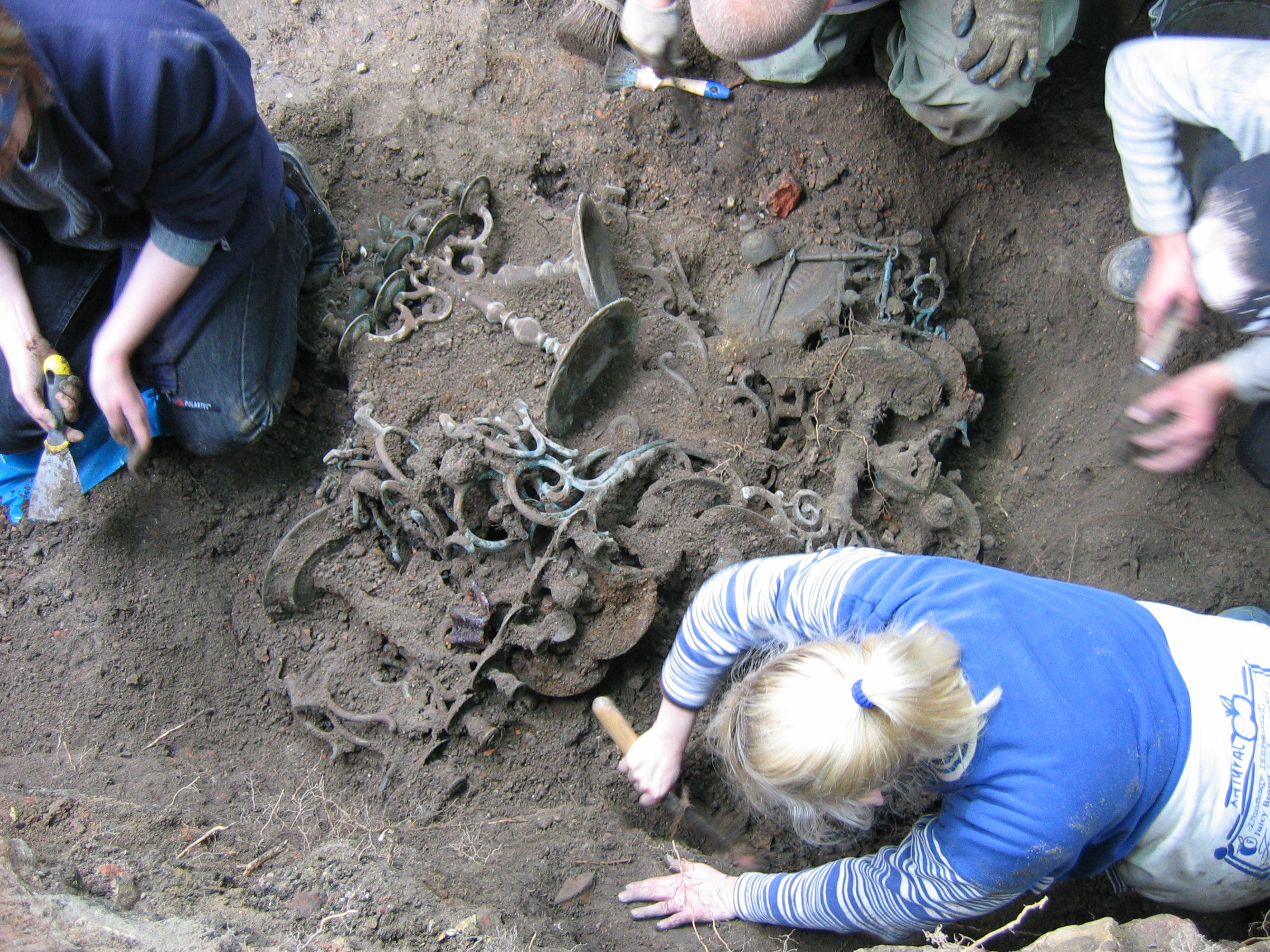
Discovery at the site, June 2004

From 28 May to 29 June 2004, on the site where the Great Synagogue in Oświęcim stood until 1939, archaeological excavations were carried out under the supervision of Dr. Małgorzata Grupa from the Nicolaus Copernicus University in Toruń.

The excavations were organized due to confirmed reports that, upon the news of the outbreak of World War II, historic items were hidden in the synagogue. They were: the account of Yishayahu Yarot, a former resident of Oświęcim, who survived the Holocaust, who described the history of hiding the objects and the story of Leon Schönker, who headed the local Jewish community in the first days of the German occupation. In 1998, when he was 90, Yarot accidentally met Jariv Nornberg, a young Israeli who had just left the army and was about to visit extermination camps in Poland. Then Yarot remembered the moment when he saw people burying what he thought was two metal boxes. He also drew a map to help researchers find hidden objects. The objects were probably hidden on the initiative of the then rabbi of the Great Synagogue, Elyahu Bombach, in the first days of the war, one meter under the floor in the corner of the synagogue, under the stairs leading to women's galleries. They were disassembled before being buried.

The initiators of the work were Nornberg and filmmaker Yahaly Gat from Israel, and the sponsors were the Conference on Jewish Material Claims Against Germany and private donors. The works commenced shortly after the Jewish Community of Bielsko-Biała received the return of the plot under the 1997 Act on the restitution of Jewish property from the Municipal Office in Oświęcim. The aim of the research and excavations was also a thorough examination of the area and reaching the foundations of the first wooden synagogue.

== Archaeological works ==
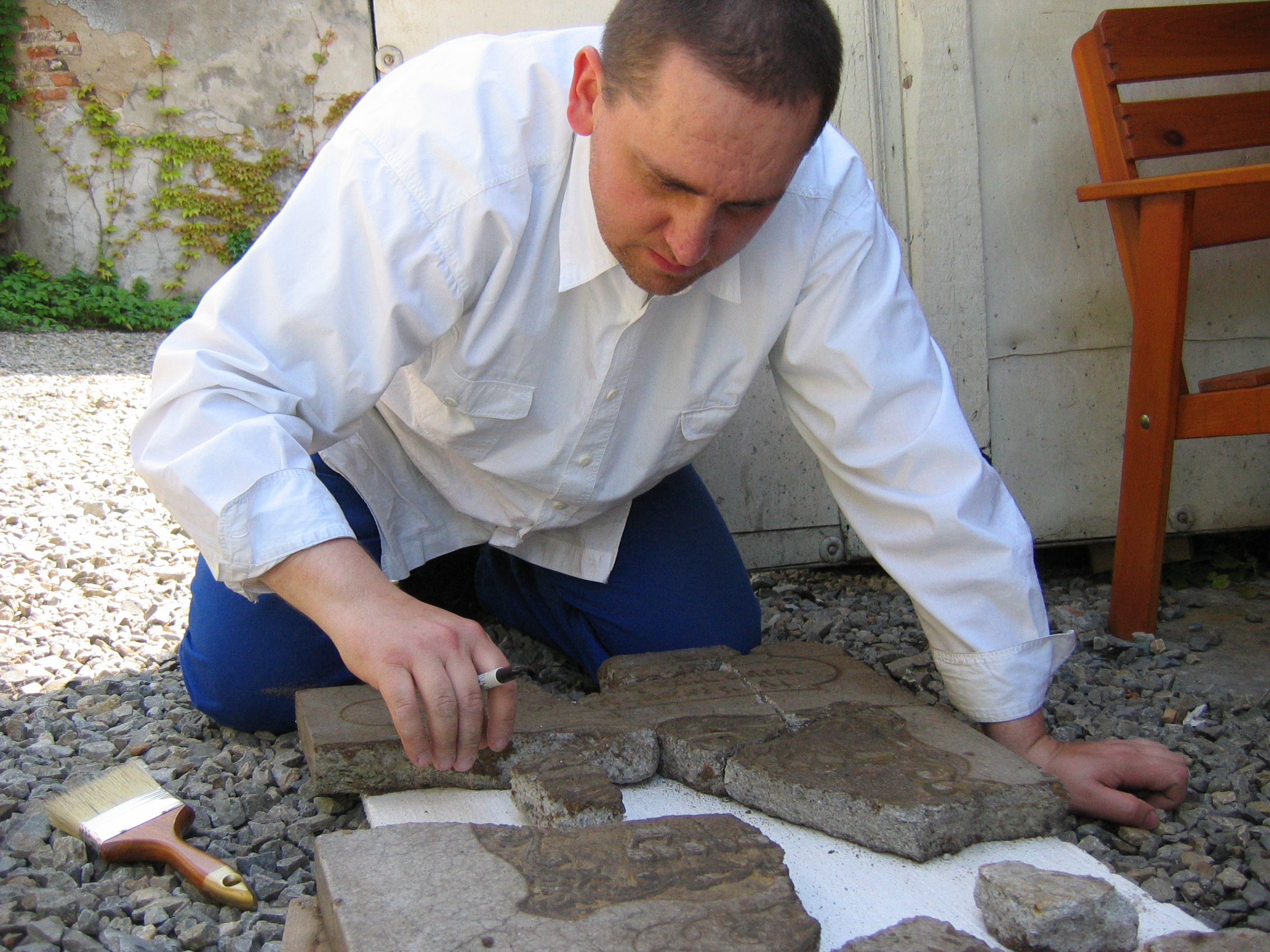
Piecing together a Shiviti at the site

For the first three weeks, archaeologists were finding only small ceramic items, coins from the early 19th century, and a plaque in honor of a rabbi from the beginning of the 20th century. It was not until mid-June that the treasure was found in the former corner of the synagogue. According to Jishajahu Yarot's account, the Torah scrolls were hidden along with the antique items. However, they could not be found. According to other accounts, they were buried in the Jewish cemetery in Oświęcim.

Archaeologists first dug two sites based on Jishajahu Jarot's account. When nothing was found in these places, general excavations within the foundations of the synagogue began. The objects were found at the last site designated by archaeologists, just a few days before the end of the four-week excavation.

During the excavations, the documentary "A Treasure in Auschwitz" directed by Yahaly Gat was made. Former Jewish residents of Oświęcim, Adam Druks and Lolek Lehrer, who live in Israel, were also involved in its implementation.

== Items ==
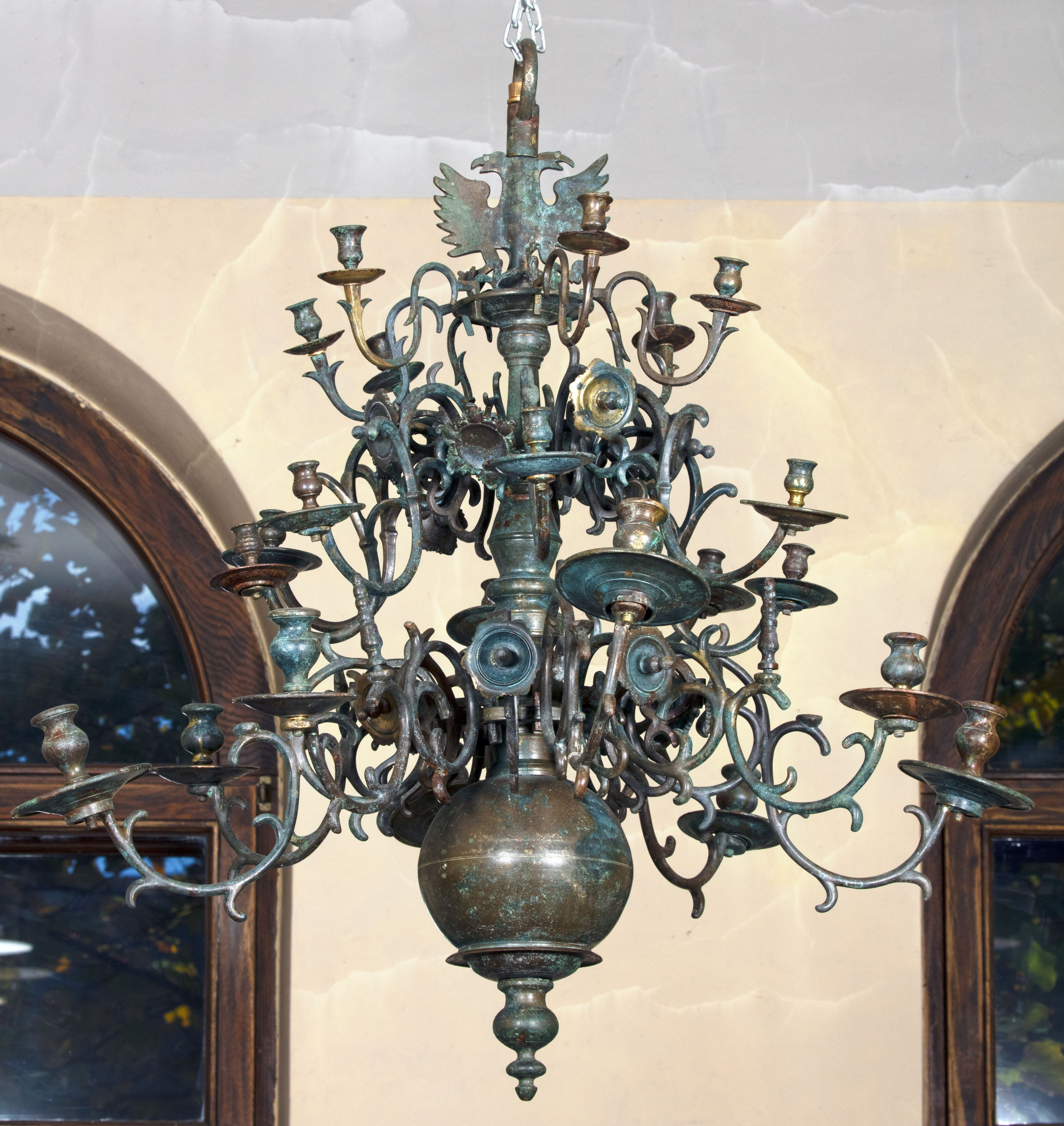
Restored excavated chandelier exhibited at the Oświęcim Synagogue

During the excavations, over 400 items were discovered, which were the equipment of the synagogue before the war. Decorative tiles were found for the synagogue's floor, decorative marble elements of the Aron Kodesh Ark, a ceremonial dish for washing hands, charred fragments of prayer books and commemorative plaques.

In the final stage of the excavations, the main part of the monuments was found. Among them were, among others, copper ner tamid lamps, numerous Hanukkah candlesticks and chandeliers from the second half of the 19th century. Fragments of ha-kodesh, pieces of furniture, benches, burned books and elements with inscriptions in Hebrew were also found

During the excavations, the remains of the Nazi bunkers dug within the synagogue were found.

The discovery was transferred to the Auschwitz Jewish Center in Oświęcim, where the artifacts were catalogued, inventoried and restored. Some of the items from the Great Synagogue are on display at the permanent exhibition at the Jewish Museum, which is part of the Center. The exhibition presents, inter alia, the ner tamid lamp, elements of the candlesticks, marble ornaments, and a complete hanging chandelier that has been preserved in its entirety.
