= New Synagogue (Shanghai) =

Former synagogues in Shanghai, China

- Chinese: 拉都會堂
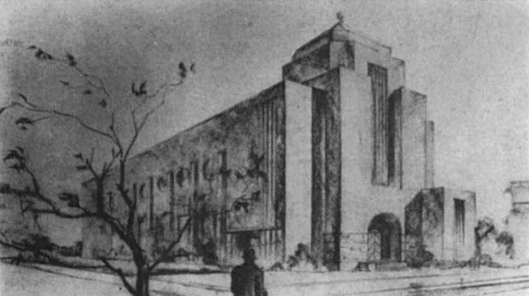
- Sketch of the proposed synagogue, from Israel's Messenger, 1937

- Location of the demolished synagogue, in Shanghai

Religion
- Affiliation: Judaism (former)
- Rite: Nusach Ashkenaz
- Ecclesiastical or organizational status: Synagogue (1941); Profane use (1941–1945); Synagogue (1945–1965); Education (1965–c. 1990s)
- Status: Destroyed

Location
- Location: 102 rue Tenant de la Tour, French Concession, Shanghai
- Country: China
- Interactive map of New Synagogue
- Coordinates: 31°12′55″N 121°27′24″E

Architecture
- Completed: 1941
- Demolished: c. 1990s
- Capacity: 1,000 worshippers

Tenant de la Tour Synagogue
- Traditional Chinese: 拉都會堂
- Simplified Chinese: 拉都会堂
Transcriptions
Standard Mandarin
- Hanyu Pinyin: Lādū Huìtáng
- Wade–Giles: La-tu Hui-t'ang

The New Synagogue (Chinese: 拉都會堂) was a former Jewish congregation and synagogue, that was located at 102 rue Tenant de la Tour in the French Concession of Shanghai, China. The synagogue was opened in 1941 to serve the city's then growing Ashkenazi Russian Jewish community, and was closed in 1965 after the departure of most Jews from Shanghai following the Communist victory in China.

The building was repurposed as the auditorium of the Shanghai Institute of Education. It was demolished in the 1990s.

== History ==
The New Synagogue was built by the Russian Jewish community of Shanghai. During the 1930s, the number of Russian Jews in the city increased to more than 4,000, exceeding the capacity of the existing Ohel Moshe Synagogue in Hongkew. After years of fundraising and construction under the leadership of Rabbi Ashkenazi, the synagogue was opened just in time for Passover in 1941. Ashkenazi served as its rabbi, and the Shanghai Ashkenazi Jewish Communal Association (SAJCA) also moved to the New Synagogue. It was located at 102 rue Tenant de la Tour (Ladu Lu in Chinese, now South Xiangyang Road) in the Shanghai French Concession, and was commonly called the Tenant de la Tour or Ladu Synagogue.

With a capacity for 1,000 people, the New Synagogue was described as a "grand" and "splendid" building. The Japanese, who had occupied the Chinese sections of the city since the 1937 Battle of Shanghai, provided tons of cement, a precious commodity during the ongoing Second Sino-Japanese War, for the foundation of the New Synagogue. Soon after the synagogue was opened, however, the Pacific War broke out on 8 December 1941. The Japanese army occupied the Shanghai French Concession and the Shanghai International Settlement, and took over the synagogue for their own use. It was returned to the Russian Jewish community after the end of World War II.

With the eruption of the Chinese Civil War and the subsequent establishment of the People's Republic of China in 1949, the Jewish population in Shanghai plummeted. In the 1960s, the New Synagogue became the "united" synagogue for all Jews, both Ashkenazim and Sephardim, still remaining in the city. It finally closed in 1965.

The synagogue was later used as the auditorium of the Shanghai Institute of Education. It was demolished in the 1990s.

== See also ==
- History of the Jews in China
- List of synagogue in China
