= The Great Synagogue Memorial Park =

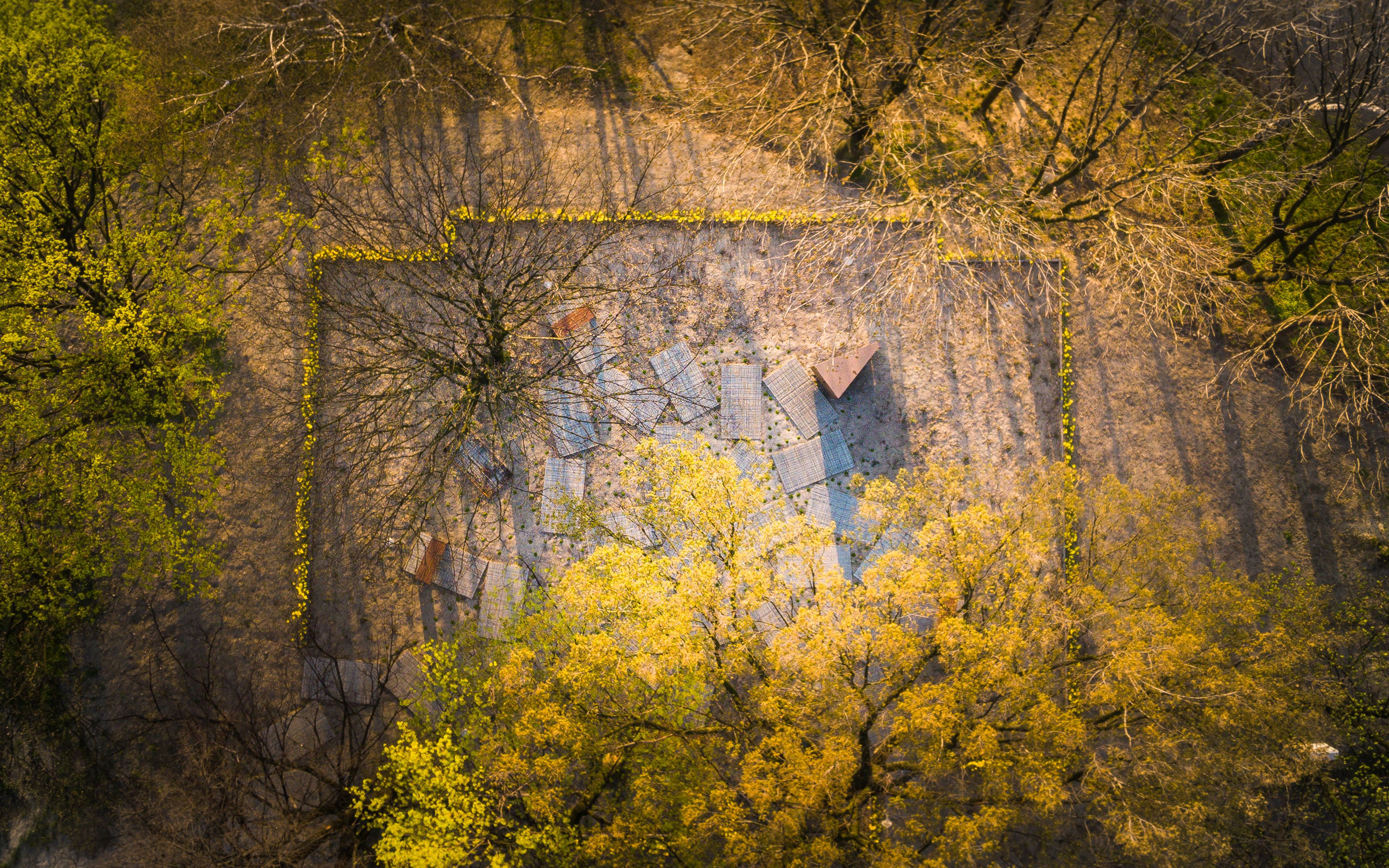
- The Great Synagogue Memorial Park
- Interactive map of The Great Synagogue Memorial Park
- Type: Memorial park
- Location: Oświęcim, Poland
- Coordinates: 50°02′18″N 19°13′11″E
- Created: 2019

The Great Synagogue Memorial Park is a memorial park devoted to the Great Synagogue in Oświęcim, Poland. The Synagogue was destroyed at the beginning of the Second World War.

== Location ==
The park is located at Berka Joselewicza Street in Oświęcim, close to the Market Square, by the Soła river.

== History ==
In 1939, the Great Synagogue in Oświęcim − the largest Jewish temple in the city − was set on fire and demolished by the Nazi occupiers on the night of November 29th/30th 1939. After the war, the temple was not rebuilt. The place where the synagogue stood was left empty as a testimony to the events of the war. Over the years, trees and shrubs have taken over the empty area previously occupied by the synagogue.

Eighty years after the destruction of the Synagogue, the inhabitants of Oświęcim decided to create a park of commemoration and reflection in this area. The project was initiated by the Auschwitz Jewish Center in Oświęcim and was carried out thanks to a fundraiser, which was attended by the inhabitants of Oświęcim, local entrepreneurs, public institutions, as well as descendants of Oświęcim Jews. The park was opened on November 28, 2019.

== Architecture and symbolism ==
=== Architecture ===
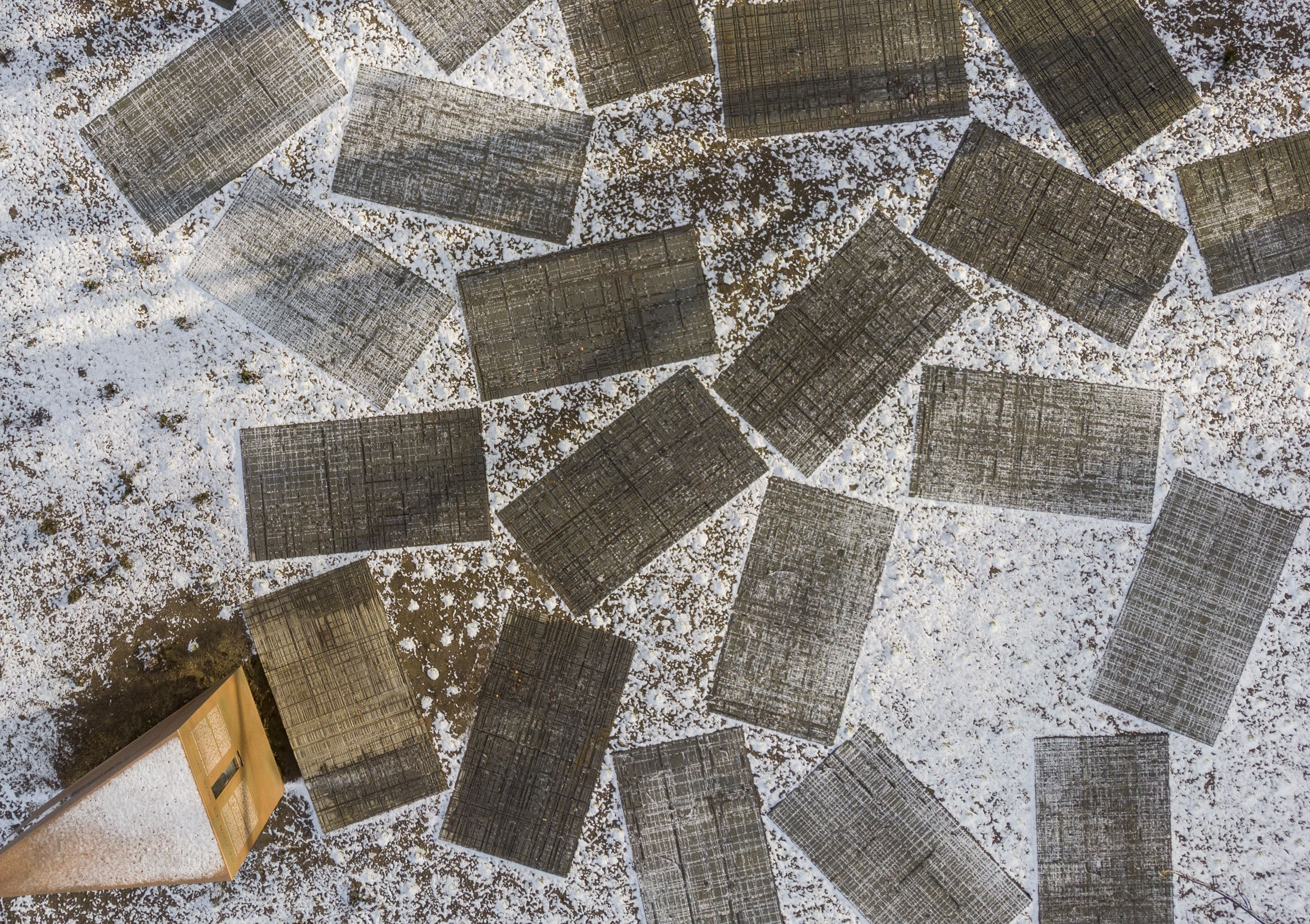
Granite slabs in the memorial park

In the park, there are plaques telling about the history of the synagogue, benches for visitors with symbolic perforations depicting the signs of the zodiac - reflecting the ornaments of the Great Synagogue - and greenery: a variety of trees, shrubs and flowers. The place is to provide residents and tourists with peace and space for reflection.

The park's design is meant to remind visitors of the shape of the synagogue. Around the centre of the structure and the stone slabs, the architects provided an outline of the temple in the form of a thin curb separating the centre of the park from the surrounding greenery. The main architectural element of the park is a mosaic of forty gray stone slabs. Each of the panels, measuring 120x220 cm, includes "reliefs" formed by grooves of various depths, the appearance of which changes under the influence of changes in lighting - changing weather, sunlight, rain or snow.

The park also has a display with a photo of the synagogue and a spatial model of the synagogue, as well as a plaque with information about the history of the memorial site.

=== Symbolism ===
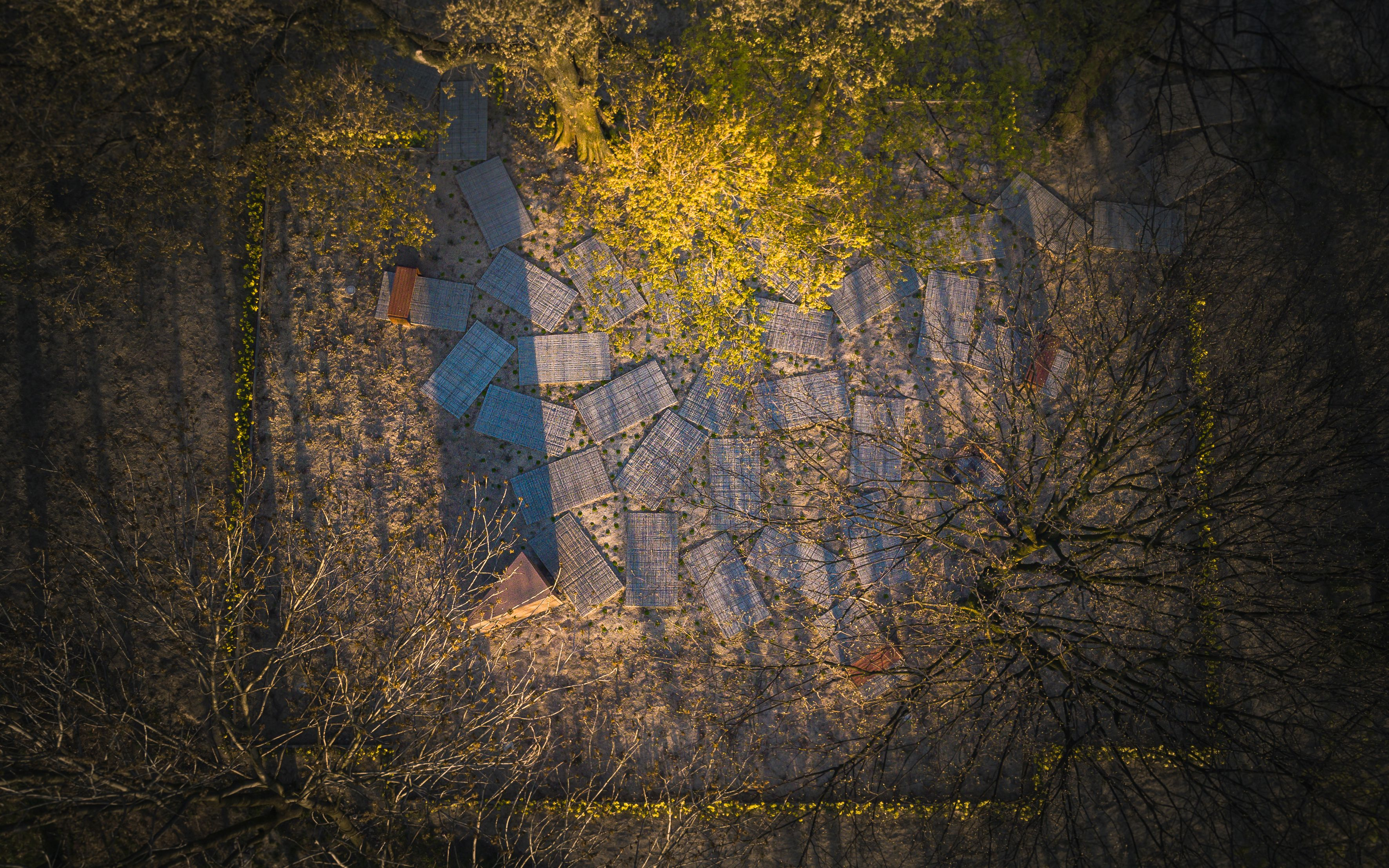
The Memorial Park seen from above

Granite slabs, previously considered industrial waste, were selected for the lines created when the sandstone slabs had served as a base for cutting other raw materials. Notches of different depth intersect and cross, which can be read as a symbolic representation of human fates crossing and heading in different directions.

The park was also created to remind people of the pre-war, multicultural history of Oświęcim and the tradition of openness to various cultures, religions and traditions.

== Architectural awards ==
The design of the Park and its implementation in the city space have received several nominations and architectural awards:

- Nomination to the European Union Prize for Contemporary Architecture – Mies van der Rohe Award (2021, for 2022)
- Award of the Lesser Poland Voivodeship
- Stanisław Witkiewicz Competition "Life in Architecture", "Best Public Space in Poland in 2015-2019"
- 1st prize in the "Public natural space" category, competition of the Society of Polish Town Planners.

== See also ==
- The Great Synagogue in Oświęcim
