= Old Synagogue (Heilbronn) =

Former synagogue in Heilbronn, Germany

Heilbronn Synagogue
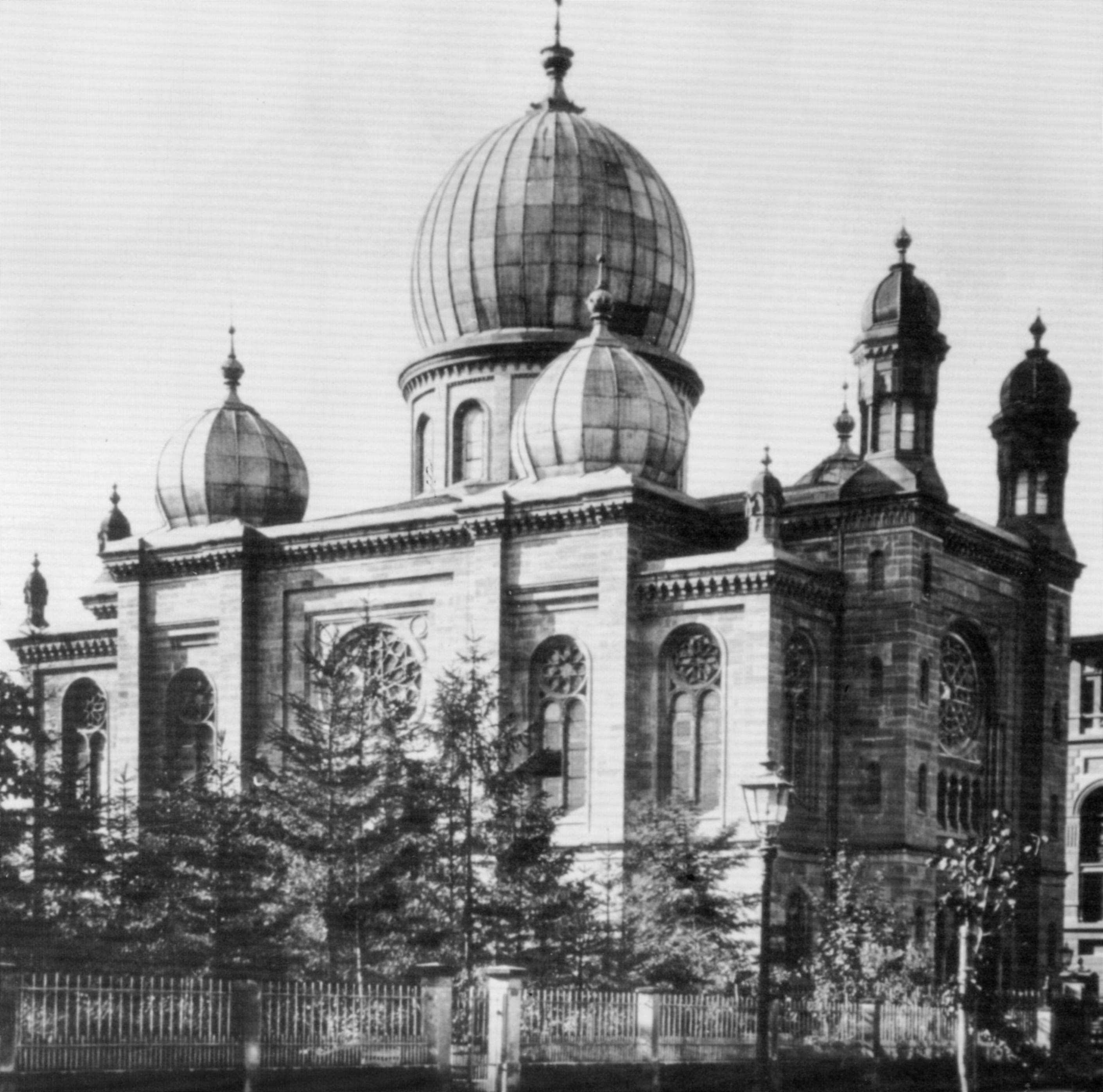
- The former synagogue c. 1900 from the north, the façade facing the avenue to the right

- Location of the destroyed synagogue in Baden-Württemberg

Religion
- Affiliation: Judaism (former)
- Ecclesiastical or organisational status: Synagogue (1897–1938)
- Status: Destroyed

Location
- Location: Heilbronn, Baden-Württemberg
- Country: Germany
- Coordinates: 49°08′N 9°13′E

Architecture
- Architect: Adolf Wolff
- Type: Synagogue architecture
- Style: Moorish Revival
- Completed: 1897
- Demolished: 1940 (following desecration during Kristallnacht)

Specifications
- Length: 35 m (115 ft)
- Width: 21.5 m (71 ft)
- Height (max): 38 m (125 ft)
- Dome: Three (maybe more)

The Heilbronn Synagogue was a Jewish congregation and synagogue, located in Heilbronn, in the state of Baden-Württemberg, Germany. The synagogue, located on Allee and constructed from local sandstone, was designed by Stuttgart architect Adolf Wolff in the Moorish Revival style and is regarded as the high point in the Neo-Orientalism phase in synagogue construction. The synagogue was completed in 1877 and demolished in 1940 following desecration by Nazis during Kristallnacht in November 1938.

A memorial stone and a sculpture are located on the site of the former synagogue.

== Location and surroundings ==
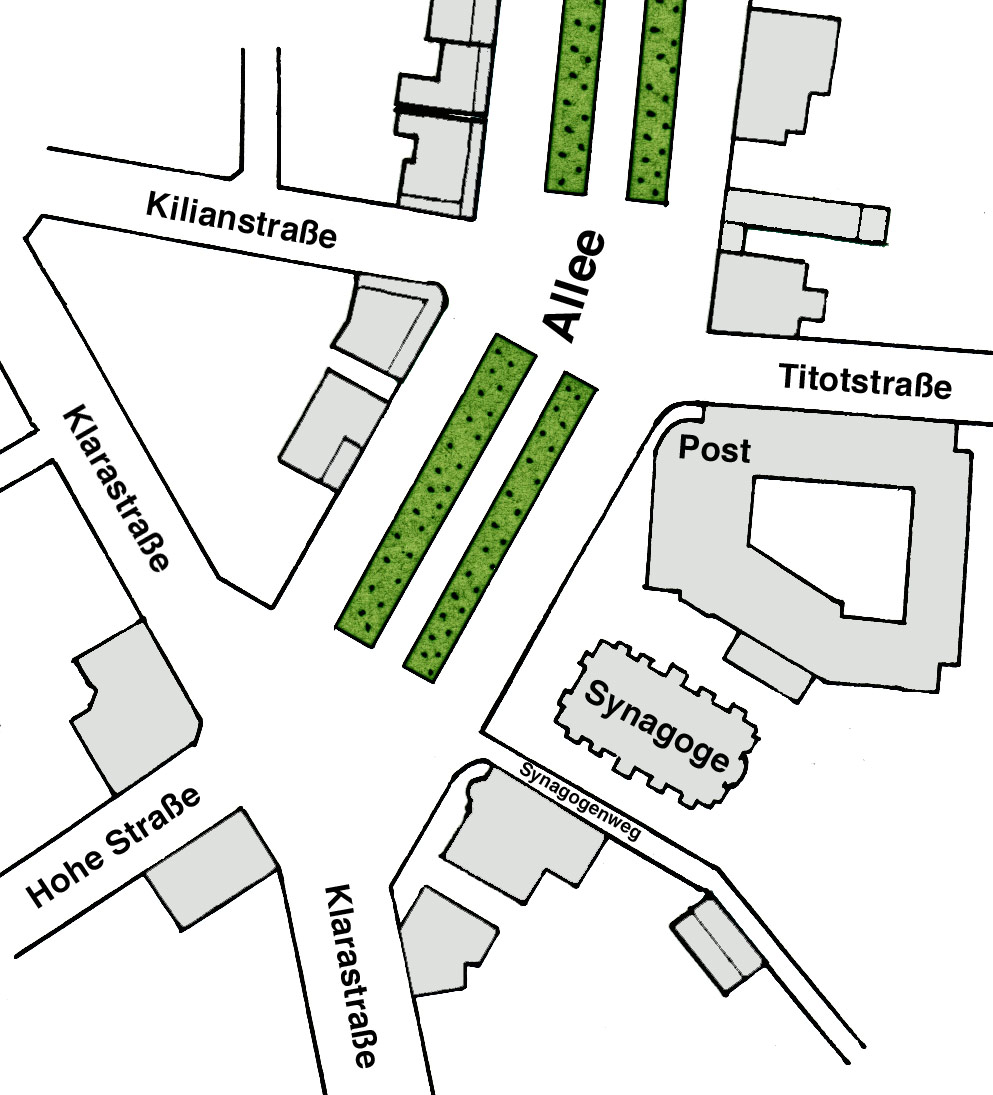
Site plan of the southern avenue at the end of the 1930s

The synagogue was built between 1873 and 1877 on the then still sparsely built-up east side of the southern Allee, beyond the original city limits of Heilbronn. The adjoining property to the north on Titotstraße was still undeveloped; on the neighboring property to the south, a doctor had the Villa Gfrörer, named after him, built in the Italian country house style in 1867. At the time of the destruction of the synagogue in 1938, this villa housed the Kahleyss Women's Clinic. At the same time the synagogue was the dominant building on the southern Allee, the (old) Harmonie festival hall was built on the middle of the Allee. There was only one other building between the synagogue and the Harmonie on the eastern side of the Allee; the rest of the land was still undeveloped. The eastern part of the synagogue property facing Friedensstraße (today Gymnasiumstraße) (Note: The street was first called Schafhausweg, from 1867 Schafhausstraße, and from 1871 Friedensstraße. In 1948 it was renamed Gymnasiumstraße.) remained undeveloped. (Note: In Die Geschichte der Juden in Heilbronn, Heilbronn am Neckar 1927, Oskar Mayer mentions the "acquisition of a building plot between Allee and Friedensstraße" on p. 65. The official city maps of Heilbronn from 1925 and 1938 show the rear part of the plot as undeveloped. It was not until 1949 that this part was built (see section Demolition of the ruins and further fate).)

The address of the synagogue was Obere Allee 14. It was not until 1899 that the four streets Obere Allee, Untere Allee, Obere Alleestraße and Untere Alleestraße were merged into a single street, Allee, with the houses being renumbered. The synagogue was given the address Allee 4.

The east side of the Allee was gradually built on. On March 15, 1928, more than 50 years after the synagogue was built, the head post office presented plans for a new Heilbronn main post office building to replace the old main post office building on the Neckar on the plot to the north of the synagogue on the corner of Allee and Titotstraße (Allee 6). The five-story-high modern new building would have blocked the view of the synagogue. In discussions between the post office, the Israelite church congregation and the city administration, it was agreed that the post office would move the new building back by two meters, dispense with a porch and keep the roofs flat so that the synagogue would continue to be visible even after the inauguration of the new post office building on 20 February 1931. (Note: On the new post office building.)

The new rulers renamed the avenue Adolf-Hitler-Allee in 1933, so that the address of the synagogue was now Adolf-Hitler-Allee 4 until its destruction in 1938 and demolition in 1940. After the collapse of the Nazi regime, the avenue was given its original name again in 1945.

On July 19, 1928, the Heilbronn municipal council decided to take ownership of the private connecting path between Allee and Friedensstraße, which ran south of the synagogue, and to widen it. As it had long been known to the residents as Synagogengässchen, it was called Synagogenweg. In contrast to Allee, nothing is known about the renaming of Synagogenweg (which has no house numbers) during the Nazi era. It appeared in the Heilbronn address book in 1929 and was still listed in the 1934 address book. It was missing from the last address book of the Nazi era in 1938/39. Synagogenweg was also missing from the post-war address books and city maps for a long time. It was only after 1982 that it was once again included in the city map of Heilbronn and in the Heilbronn address book.

== Architecture and interior ==
The two-story synagogue, which was built from Heilbronn sandstone, took up mainly oriental style elements in its appearance, but also European style elements in the interior and is regarded as the high point of the neo-oriental style phase in synagogue construction. It was basically built like a church, but transformed into a synagogue through the use of oriental architectural forms. Like many medieval churches, the synagogue had a double-tower façade with a large rose window, the domes were borrowed from Indian or Persian architecture and Moorish style elements were also used, whereas the tracery of the windows was more reminiscent of Gothic architecture.

Floor plans

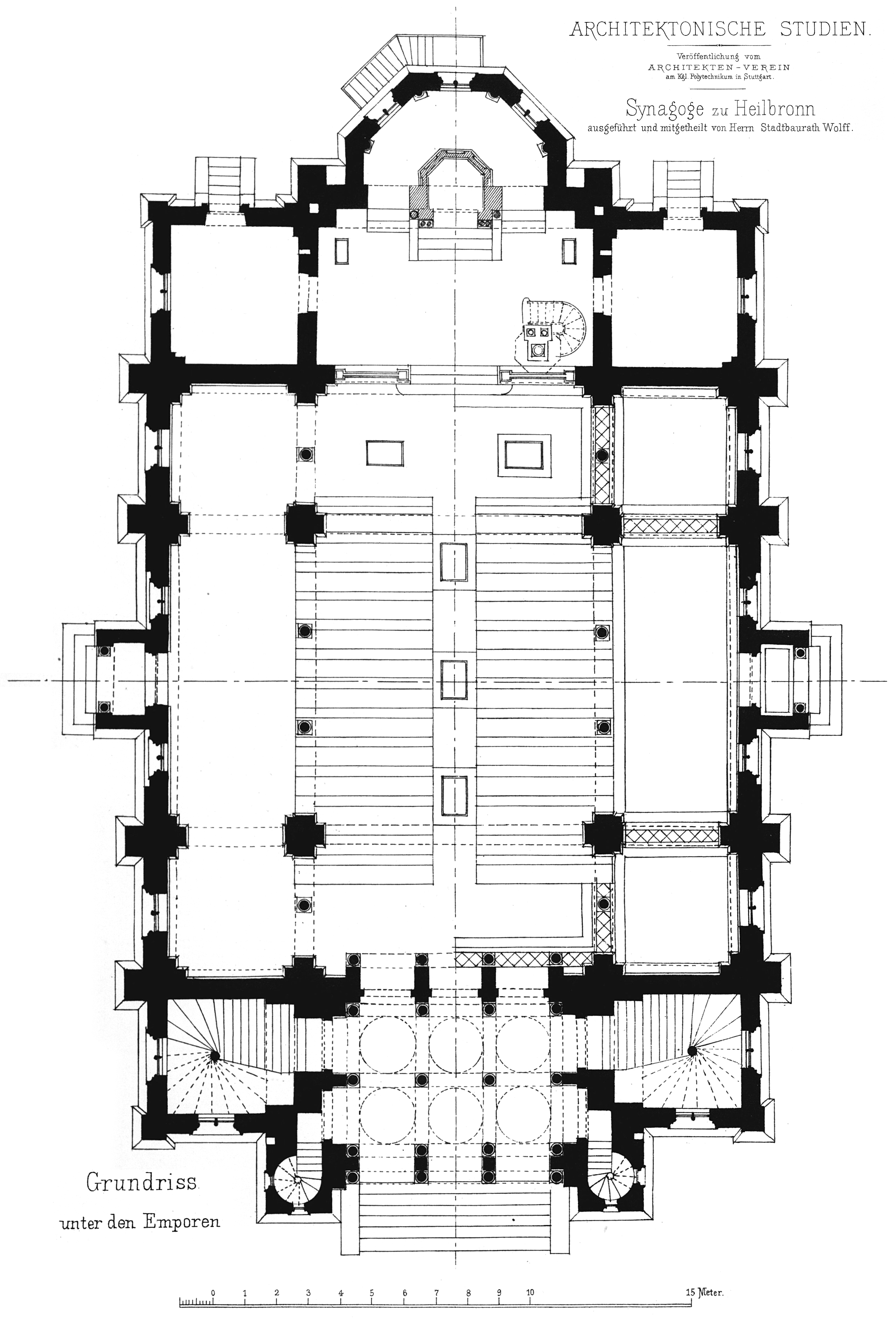
Floor plan under the galleries

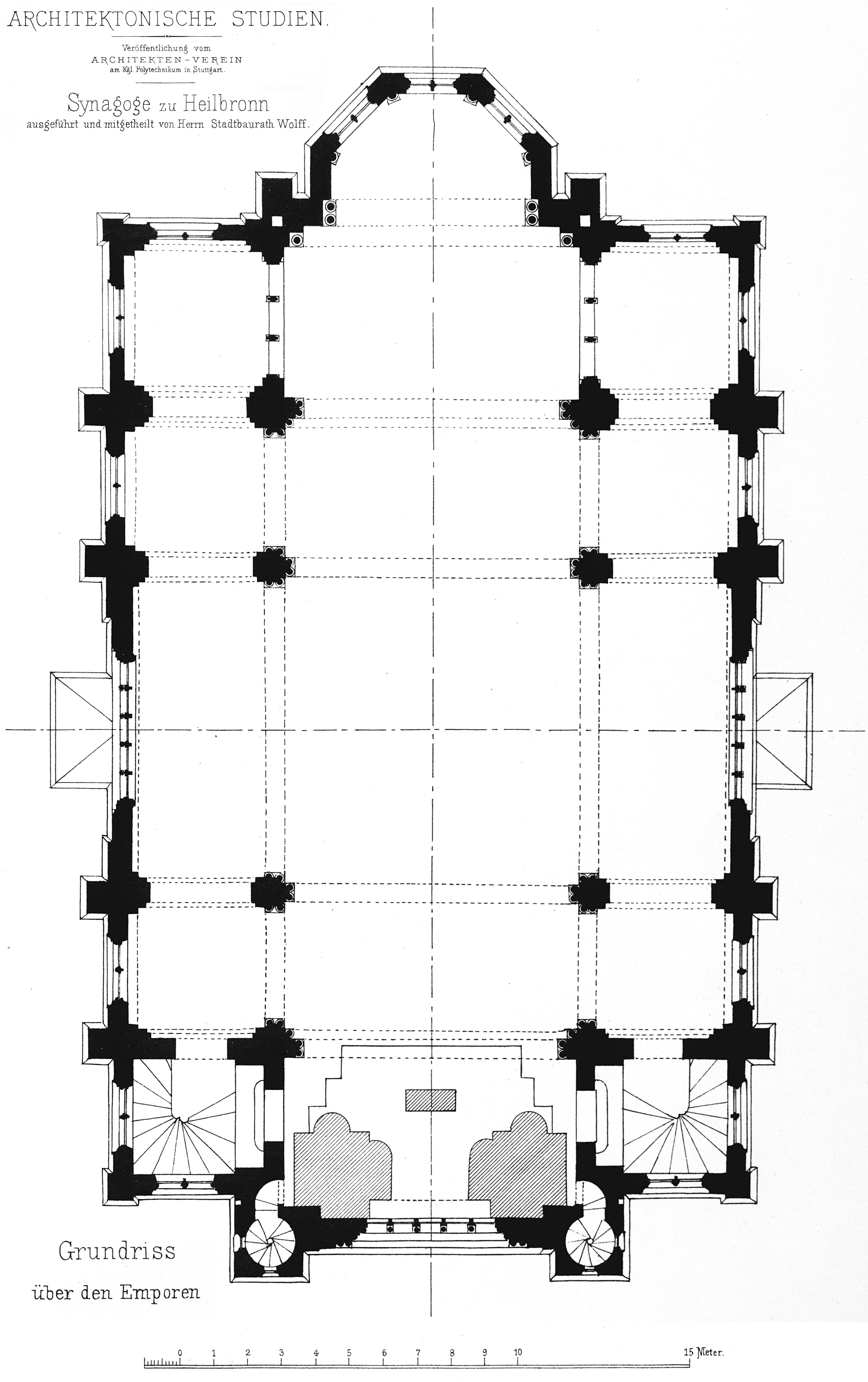
Floor plan above the galleries

The synagogue was around 35 m (115 ft) long, 21.5 m (71 ft) wide and, including the main dome, around 38 m (125 ft) high. (Note: Dimensions (including the external staircases) according to the floor plans and the view in Architektonische Studien.) It was aligned along a northwest–southeast axis; the front façade facing the Allee was in the northwest. Its layout was somewhere between a central building and a nave, which is why the building has been described both as a central building with side aisles and as a three-aisled nave with central and side aisles or as a nave synagogue with a dome and two-tower façade.

The basic building type was a central structure in the shape of a Greek cross, which was set in an almost square rectangle. The resulting spandrels between the arms of the cross and the rectangle were open as part of "side aisles". Four large pillars formed a square in the middle of the building and supported a large tambour dome. Further columns separated the "side aisles" from the central building and contributed to the impression of a three-aisled building inside, although it was not divided into aisles by a regular column position.

This central rectangle was adjoined by an extension to the east and west across the entire width of the building. In the east, this was open to the "nave" and housed the pulpit. Further to the east was a choir in the form of a protruding, polygonal apse, in which the Torah ark (Aron Kodesh) was located. At the sides of the pulpit room, adjacent to the "side aisles", there was a room for the precentor and a room for the rabbi. The corresponding extension to the west was designed in the middle as a low entrance hall for the men, supported by several columns standing one behind the other, from which three doors led into the interior. On the sides were staircases leading to the side aisle galleries for the women. The middle section of the western extension with the front façade facing the avenue protruded. As a result, the façade was narrower than the actual structure, and the external western ends of the "side aisles" with domes and Gothicized windows contributed to the impression the façade created on the viewer.

Views from the construction files

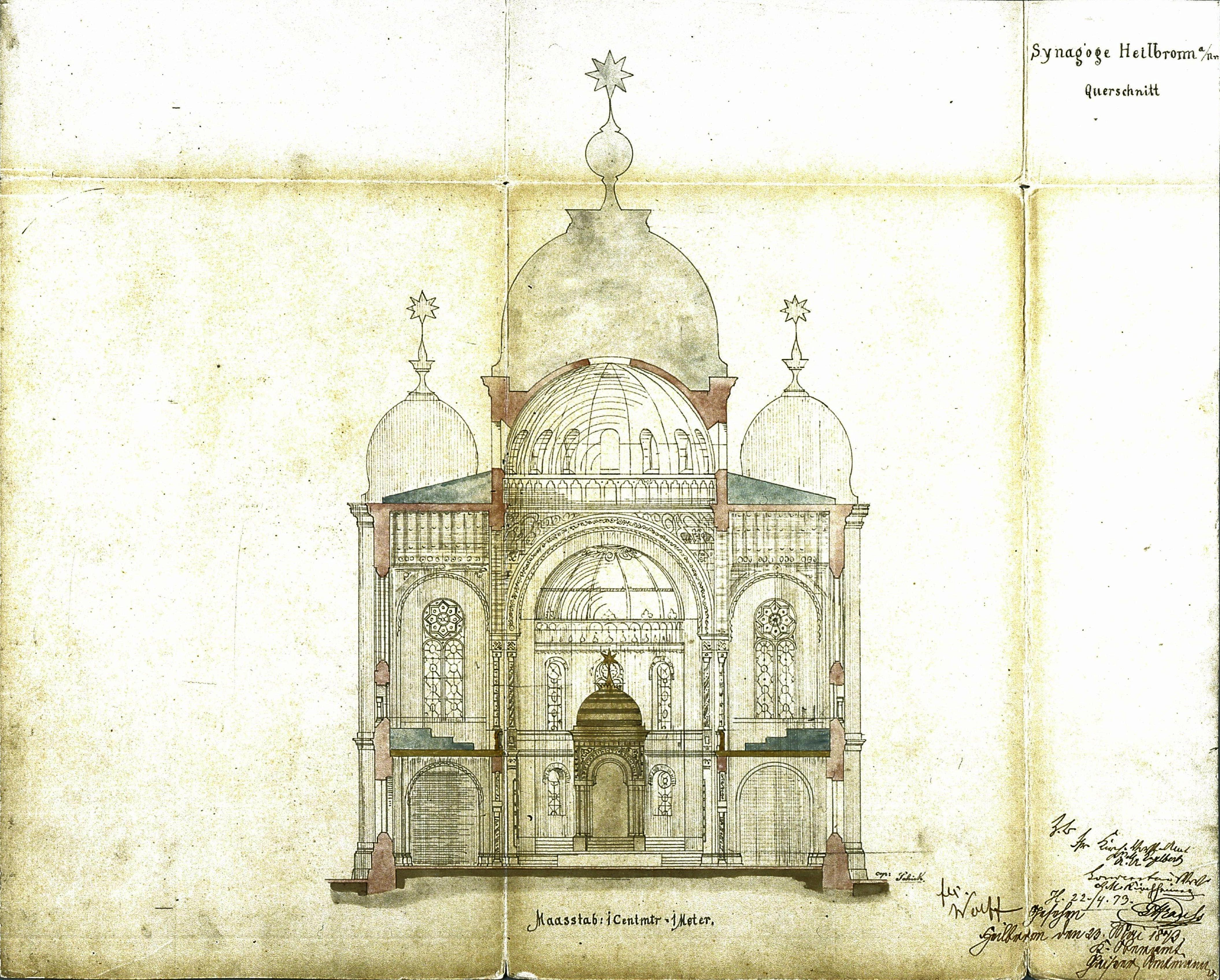
Cross-section, looking east towards the choir

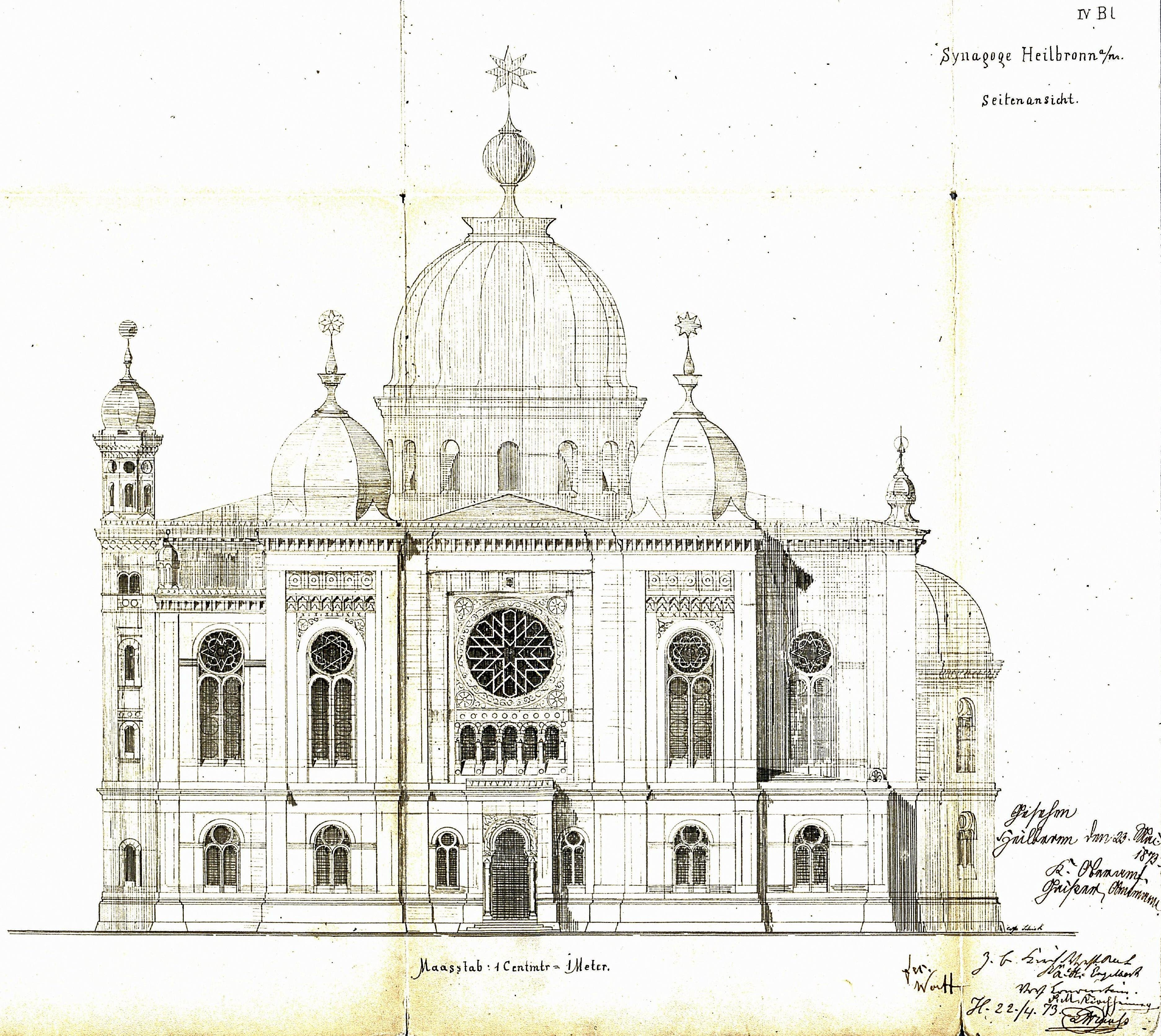
Southern side view

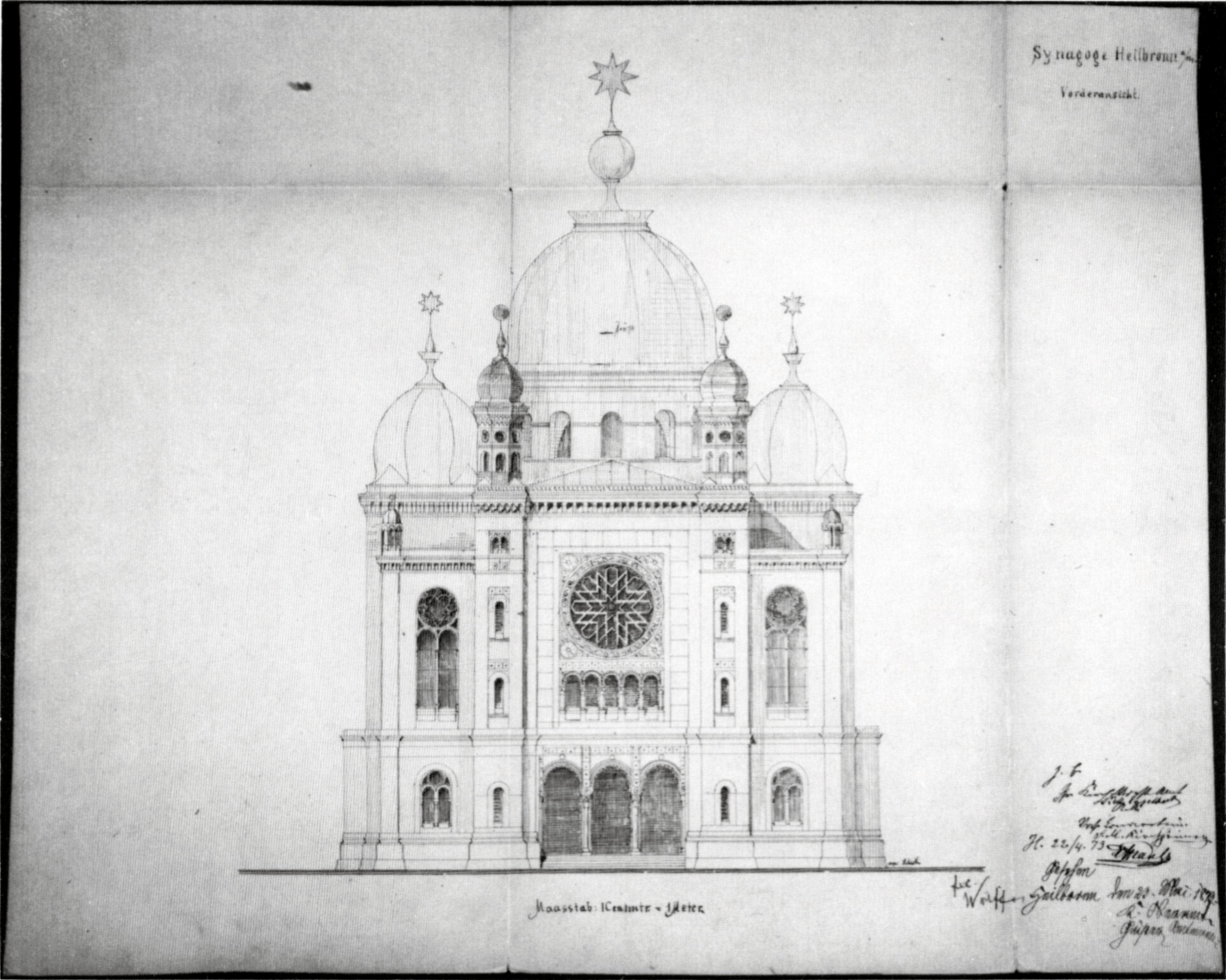
Front façade facing the Allee

The façade was designed similarly to the Nuremberg synagogue on Hans-Sachs-Platz, which had also been built according to Wolff's plans: A large rose window with Moorish star ornamentation above a five-part arcade frieze dominated the façade. An arch on slender columns framed the rose window and was itself inserted into an ornamental wall panel. The entrance hall was reached through a three-part portal with Moorish-style arches. Above the portal was a gilded Hebrew inscription with words from Isaiah 56:7 ("My house shall be called a house of prayer for all nations" (Note: Hebrew: ביתי בית תפלה יקרא לכל העמים)). Slender turrets with tempietto-like domed tops closed off the two sides of the façade.

The synagogue had flat hipped roofs The roof of the rectangle had a smaller dome without a tambour (base) at each of its four corners, above the spandrels, which otherwise corresponded to the shape of the large central dome. The tambour of the large central dome had twelve round-arched windows; the dome itself was covered with patinated, shimmering green copper.

The side view of the synagogue reveals a clear floor plan. Two rows of windows were located one above the other, with the upper windows being larger than the lower ones. Five fragments of the synagogue windows, which a citizen had salvaged and kept after the synagogue fire, were given to the Heilbronn city administration in 1988 for the municipal museums. They were created according to the technique of medieval stained glass window art, framed with lead rods, tinted slightly purple and yellow and showing plant motifs in Art Nouveau style.

In the middle of each of the two long sides, side portals provided access to the interior of the synagogue, which also had rose windows but were smaller and simpler than the main portal. Pilaster-like strips of masonry gave the building a vertical structure. The sandstone masonry was decorated with rich ornamentation, without any reference to human, animal or other models from nature.

Inside, the columns, arches and stuccowork were inspired by the Moorish architectural style of the Alhambra. However, these decorative forms were subordinate to the European style of the building, which is reminiscent of a medieval church. The pulpit was modeled on church pulpits. Wide cornices in the Neoclassical style, which separated the lower and upper floors, and Gothicized windows also softened the oriental impression.

The synagogue had three galleries. A gallery in the north-west, above the entrance hall, held the Walcker organ. The galleries above the side aisles, which could be reached by the staircases next to the entrance hall, were intended for women (as the sexes are separated in Jewish places of worship); there were 33 benches here. In the main room, under the central dome, there were 34 benches for the men. In the central dome there was a large brass chandelier with 80 burners for gas and electric light. The dome itself was supported on the inside by strong pilasters, which were decorated with bundled half-columns at the height of the galleries and placed in front of the pillar in the form of services.

A vaulted, polygonal (five-part) choir with a Gothic appearance formed the south-eastern end of the building behind a high horseshoe arch. Three large choir windows showed the Star of David (Hebrew: מגן דוד, Magen David, English: "Shield of David") in multiple variations as decorative tracery in their upper parts.

The Torah ark (Hebrew: ארון הקודש, Aron ha-Qodesh, "Holy Ark") covered with a parochet stood in this choir. It combined the Moorish forms of the interior with the shape of the domes and was decorated with rich stucco work. The bima (prayer desk) was placed a little higher in front of the Torah ark. Above the shrine hung a light, called Ner Tamid or Eternal Light. The oak pulpit was placed diagonally to the right of the Torah ark.

=== Organ ===
The Heilbronn synagogue was already equipped with an organ at the end of the 1870s. The instrument came from the workshop of the Heilbronn organ builder Johann Heinrich Schäfer; it had 28 stops, spread over 2 manuals and pedal. The organist Johannes Graf, later the cathedral organist in Ulm for many years, was employed as organist and choirmaster by the Jewish community of Heilbronn in those years.

In 1925, a new synagogue organ was built as Opus 2095 by the Walcker company from Ludwigsburg and had 22 stops on two manuals and pedal. The disposition of the instrument was as follows:

I Great manual C-f^{3}
1.	Bourdon	16′
2.	Principal	8′
3.	Flute	8′
4.	Viola di Gamba	8′
5.	Covered	8′
6.	Octave	4′
7.	Chimney flute	4′
8.	Fifth	2 2/3′
9.	Octave	2′
10.	Mixture V
11.	Cornett V
12.	Clarinet	8′

II Manual C-f^{3}
13.	Principal	8′
14.	Flute	8′
15.	Salicional	8′
16.	Aeoline	8′
17.	Transverse flute	4′
18.	Dolce	4′

Pedal C-d^{1}
19.	Violone bass	16′
20.	Contra Bourdon	16′
21.	Flute bass	8′
22.	Trombone	16′

- Couplers:
  - Normal coupler: II/I, I/P, II/P
  - Suboctave coupler: II/I
  - Superoctave coupler: II/I
- Playing assistance of the organ: Piano, Forte, Tutti, 2 free combinations, Crescendo, Crescendo Ab, hand register Ab, Pianopedal

== History ==
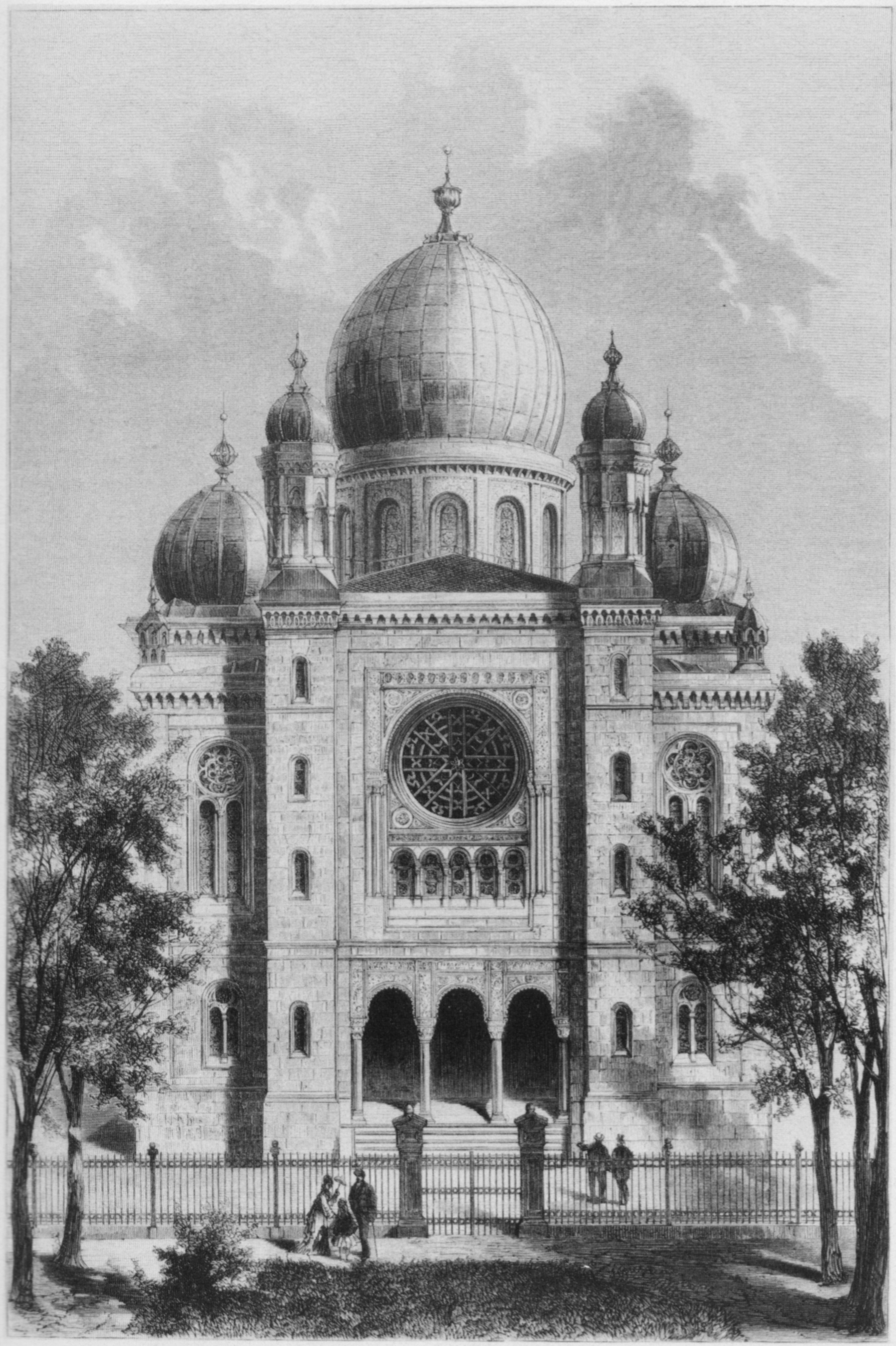
Front of the synagogue. Wood engraving from 1877

=== Planning, construction and inauguration ===
From 1830, Jews settled in Heilbronn again for the first time in 354 years. Due to further immigration, especially from rural communities, the Jewish community in Heilbronn grew considerably from the middle of the 19th century. On October 21, 1861, it separated from its mother congregation in Sontheim and formed an independent Israelite church congregation. The Lehrensteinsfeld district rabbinate, which was superior to the Israelite parishes, was moved to Heilbronn on July 1, 1867. In 1862 there were 137 Jews in Heilbronn, in the 1864 census there were 369, and in 1871 there were already 610.

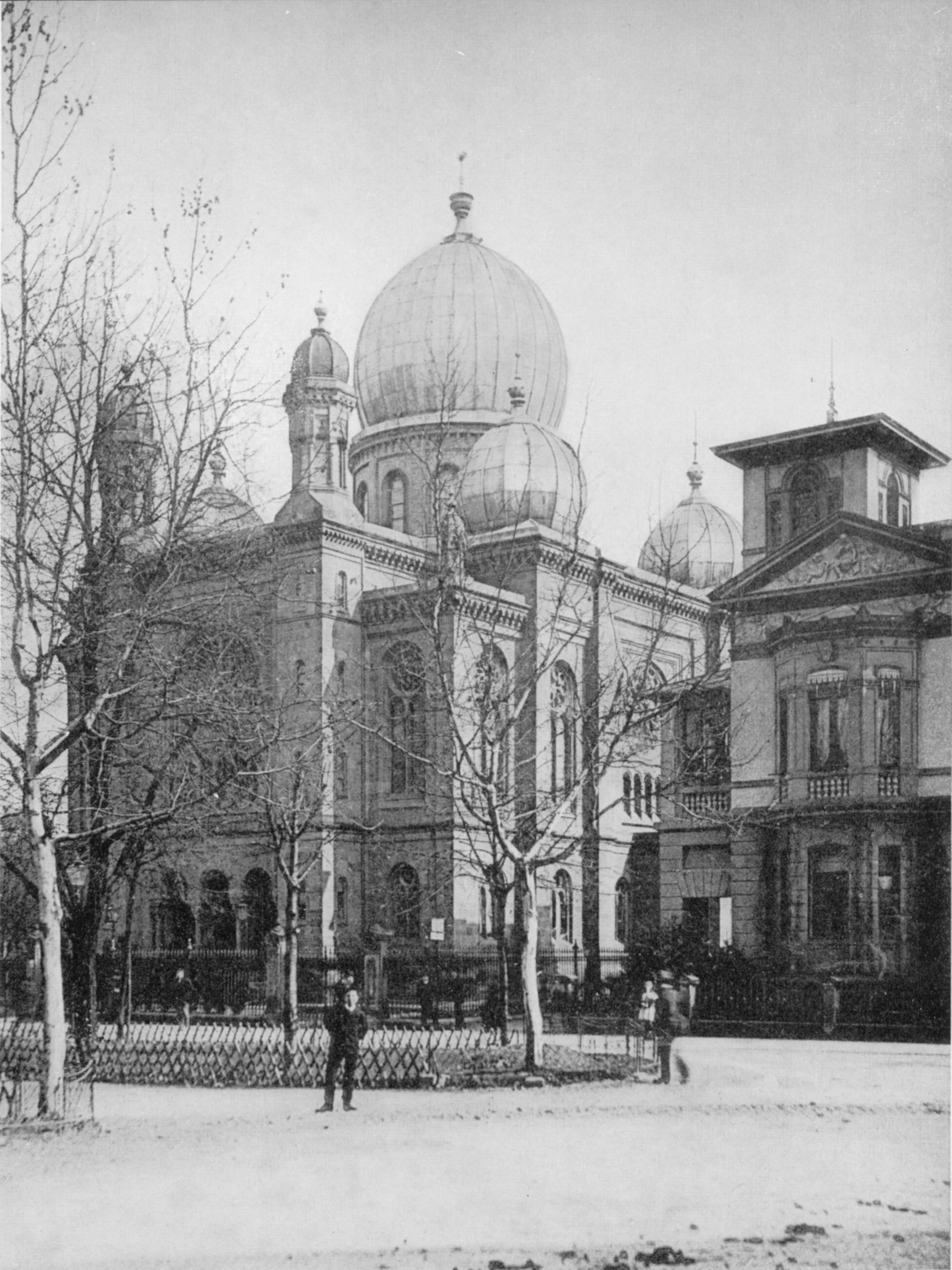
The synagogue from the south in 1894, taken across the avenue. Villa Gfrörer on the right.

The only synagogue in the city at the time had been located in the central building of the Deutschhof since 1857, but the space there was very limited. On February 1, 1865, the congregation's church council decided to purchase a plot of land on Allee for 10,000 guilders. As the decision was not unanimous, the purchase could only be made in 1871 after fierce controversy, whereby the price of the land had already risen to 16,000 guilders. The decision to build was made on June 21, 1871. In 1873, the design by Stuttgart architect Adolf Wolff was approved, the third synagogue to be built in Heilbronn after the Stuttgart Synagogue (1859 to 1861) and the Ulm Synagogue (1870 to 1873). The congregation decided by 60 votes to four in favor of installing a synagogue organ, although instrumental music was not provided for in the orthodox liturgy and this led to a conflict with the orthodox members of the congregation. The costs for the new synagogue amounted to a total of 372,778 marks, of which the municipality of Heilbronn provided 30,000 guilders (51,428 Reichsmark) in 1876 in the form of a loan from the foundation's funds.

The foundation stone was laid in mid-August 1873, on November 23, 1874, it was possible to celebrate the topping-out of the building, and at the end of May 1877 the construction was completed. On June 7, 1877, the Torah scrolls were moved from the prayer hall in the Deutschhof to an adjoining room in the new synagogue, and on June 8, the synagogue was solemnly consecrated. After a farewell service in the prayer hall in the Deutschhof (the "old synagogue"), the ceremonial entry of the seven Torah scrolls into the new synagogue took place at 11 a.m., followed by a sermon and a prayer of consecration by Rabbi Moses Engelbert. A midday banquet in the Rose restaurant with many representatives of official bodies and an evening ball in the Harmonie festival hall concluded the celebration.

=== Destruction by arson in 1938 ===
From then on, the religious life of Heilbronn's Jewish community took place in the synagogue. In May 1927, the 50th anniversary of the synagogue was celebrated with a ceremony and a commemorative publication on the history of the Jews in Heilbronn.

Eleven years later, the Heilbronn synagogue came to an end. Like many other synagogues in the German Reich, it was destroyed by arson on the night of November 9–10, 1938, the so-called " Reichskristallnacht" or Reichspogromnacht. (Note: The chronology follows the 1992 essay by the director of the Heilbronn City Archives.)

On November 9, 1938, the NSDAP leadership had gathered in Munich to celebrate the 15th anniversary of the "Beer Hall Putsch". The order to carry out anti-Jewish riots following the assassination attempt on a German embassy employee in Paris seems to have reached the Heilbronn NSDAP by telephone at 11:30 p.m., probably via several intermediate stages. According to court findings from 1950/51, (Note: The trial files are in the Ludwigsburg State Archives, fonds EL 312 (Heilbronn public prosecutor's office), book 40 (KMs 5/50).) the Heilbronn NSDAP district leader, Richard Drauz, considered imposing a heavy fine on the Heilbronn Jews rather than staging a "popular uproar" that would damage the "reputation of the NSDAP at home and abroad". (Note: Drauz according to the court documents of 1950/51.) The letter from a lawyer, which is included in the trial files, mentions "confiscation or levying a contribution of 100,000 marks". The fact that the district leader did not get through "to the top" with this plan was the reason why Heilbronn was "left behind". It is unclear whether Drauz was present in Heilbronn that night or whether he was negotiating with higher NSDAP offices from abroad. (Note: In contrast to Franke, who assumes that Drauz was not in Heilbronn.)

The Heilbronn synagogue did not burn until the morning of November 10, a few hours after the other arsons. The other outrages of the November pogroms only took place in Heilbronn on the evening of November 10, not on the night of November 9–10 as was the case elsewhere. Drauz's negotiations had presumably taken some time, so that there was only time for a single action that night - the synagogue arson. The other acts of destruction against Jewish individuals and businesses only took place under the cover of darkness the next night.

There are various, sometimes contradictory statements about the course of the fire, some of which were only made verbally decades later, so they should be treated with caution. Passers-by and a gynaecologist living in the immediate vicinity of the synagogue claim to have heard noises "like the rattling of petrol cans" in the synagogue at around one o'clock in the morning on November 10, 1938; the latter claims to have alerted the fire department at this time out of concern for his clinic (located next to the synagogue). Other accounts of when the fire department was alerted vary between three and five a.m. It seems likely that the perpetrators had already gathered flammable material in the synagogue at one o'clock in the morning and doused it with petrol.

At around five o'clock, residents heard two violent detonations. This corresponds to the information in a newspaper article (Note: This happened frequently.) published on November 11, 1938, in the Nazi-dominated Heilbronner Tagblatt, according to which there was a fire in the synagogue at five o'clock. In a poem in which a Heilbronn firefighter involved in the extinguishing work made fun of the synagogue fire, the time at which the fire became known is mentioned as "Des Morgens um die 6. Stund." (Note: The poem is entitled The Fire. According to his own later statements at various court hearings after 1945, the author often recited joking poems at fire department camaraderie evenings. The poem, which he was sorry to have written, arose from his "poetic and humorous streak". According to Schrenk, p. 297 and note 24 on p. 312, it can be found in the Stuttgart Main State Archives in fonds J 355, Bü V 242; publication was approved on July 13, 1989.) Residents reported that they had become aware of the synagogue fire at around 6 or 6:30 a.m. due to lively noises. Shortly after seven o'clock, according to the Heilbronner Tagblatt, the dome of the synagogue was also burning outside, which is confirmed by a photograph taken shortly before seven o'clock in the morning according to the photographer. Another photograph shows the synagogue with a burnt-out dome and numerous bystanders and can be dated to 8:42 a.m. thanks to the clock on the post office shown in the picture.

The role of the Heilbronn fire department in the synagogue fire has not been conclusively clarified. What is clear is that they did not extinguish the fire in the synagogue, but limited themselves to protecting the surrounding buildings; this is reported both in the newspaper article in the Heilbronner Tagblatt and in the fire poem by the Heilbronn firefighter. The newspaper article writes that "it proved impossible for the firefighters to enter the synagogue, which was filled with smoke and fumes", "even with gas masks". In later court proceedings, the firefighters also emphasized that it was no longer possible to enter. In contrast, it can be inferred from the firefighter's fire poem that extinguishing the fire - regardless of whether this was still possible or not - was not intended at all, but on the contrary, the firefighters had provided the necessary draught by forcibly opening the door, which allowed the fire to spread:

The fire department, you have to admit,
did not allow themselves to joke with the fire
and acted like a doctor,
and applied the same prescription.
If a child has no air, it must suffocate,
That was the case with the fire.

We first had to peck the door open,
then there was the real bang.
The fire was extinguished
using the new method,
the smoke was blown straight through the hose,
which encouraged fire and smoke.

The claim made in fire department circles after World War II that the Lord Mayor (Heinrich Gültig), who was present at the scene of the fire, placed the fire department under his command and forbade it to extinguish the fire is considered unlikely and is just as impossible to prove as the suspicion expressed anonymously to Hans Franke in 1961 that the fire department had "extinguished" the fire with petrol. Even the 200-litre barrel of petrol that one of the photographers of the burning synagogue claimed to have seen under the dome of the synagogue according to a newspaper article from 1958 can neither be proven nor recognized in one of his photographs. (Note: This is a newspaper article by Lothar F. Strobl in the Neckar-Echo of November 11, 1958, p. 7.) The commander of the Heilbronn fire department was still put on trial in 1939 in the synagogue arson case, but was acquitted on October 2, 1939, for lack of evidence.

=== Demolition of the ruins and further fate ===
On November 30, 1938, the municipality of Heilbronn purchased the synagogue property from the Jewish Community. For the removal of the debris, it demanded 10,000 Reichsmark from the Jewish Community, which was offset against the purchase price of 10,000 Reichsmark. The completely burnt-out ruins of the synagogue remained standing until mid-January 1940, when the company Koch & Mayer began demolition work on behalf of the city administration. (Note: A report in the Heilbronner Tagblatt of January 19, 1940 (p. 5).) (Note: Franke is mistaken when he dates the beginning of the demolition of the synagogue to February 16, 1940.) The fate of the synagogue ruins was discussed at a closed meeting of the municipal council on February 23, 1940. Mayor Gültig reported that the company commissioned with the demolition and removal of the ruins had estimated 34,000 Reichsmark for the work and that the value of the demolition material remaining in the hands of the city was 10,000 Reichsmark. The whereabouts of the synagogue stones are unclear; according to various reports, they were used to build roads or walls in Heilbronn.

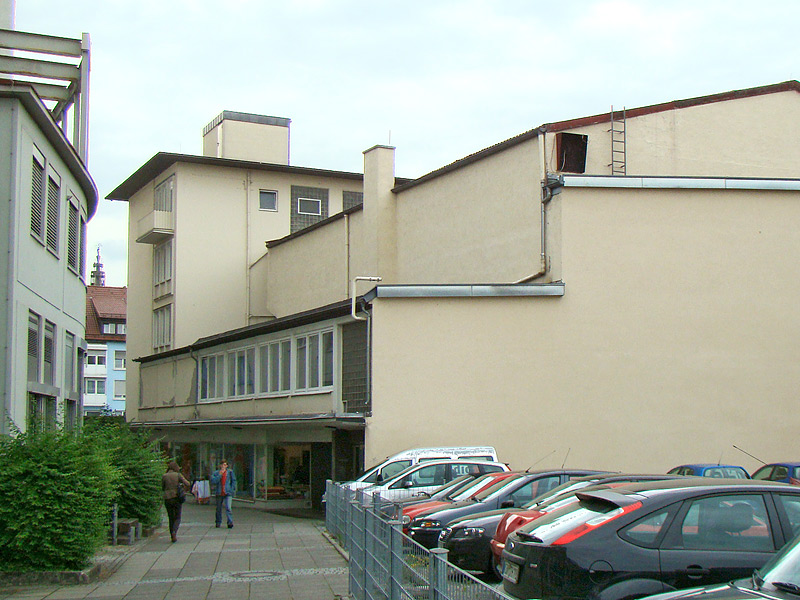
Synagogenweg with cinema building on the former site of the synagogue. Looking northwest towards the avenue.

After the end of the Nazi regime, the synagogue property passed to the cinema operator Ludwig Stern, a Jewish Heilbronn resident, who had a cinema built on it in 1948/49. "Out of respect for the former site of the synagogue", Stern deliberately built the Scalalichtspiele cinema, which opened on November 27, 1949, on the rear part of the property on Gymnasiumstraße. The cinema building also housed the Hillebrecht concert café.

Two years later, on November 22, 1951, the Gaildorf factory owner Wilhelm Bott took over the Scala-Lichtspieltheater (renamed the Metropol-Lichtspieltheater on May 1, 1952) and the synagogue property at a forced auction. On June 21, 1952, the Hillebrecht opened a fast food restaurant and a restaurant-concert garden with dancing on the front part of the synagogue grounds on Allee. In 1956, this part of the property was overbuilt with another cinema, the Universum, which opened on September 13. In 1989/1990, the Bott film theatre companies sold the property to the neighbouring publisher of the Heilbronner Stimme, which leased the cinemas. After the closure of the cinemas in July 2000, the 1948/49 Metropol building on the rear part of the property, for which no new tenant could be found, was demolished at the beginning of 2001; this part of the property has since served as a parking lot.

In 2003, Avital Toren, as community leader of the new Jewish community in Heilbronn, which was in the process of being established, was interested in renting rooms in the cinema center on the site of the former synagogue. This failed due to the high conversion costs that would have been caused by security regulations for Jewish institutions in Germany, so that other premises were rented.

=== Legal investigation of the arson ===
Who set fire to the Heilbronn synagogue and who gave the order on site could not be officially clarified. As early as 1939, the commander of the Heilbronn fire department was accused of setting fire to the synagogue, but was acquitted on October 2, 1939, due to lack of evidence.

After World War II, the Heilbronn public prosecutor's office dealt with the synagogue fire in three trials in 1946/50, 1953 and 1955. All three trials were discontinued due to a lack of evidence and the files were destroyed in the meantime. A total of seven people were charged in these three trials. Several court proceedings also dealt with the synagogue fire, without any usable information for the trial. Even decades later, "all investigations met with stubborn silence" or led "at most to cryptic hints", so that the name of the actual arsonist could not be determined. A single perpetrator can be ruled out due to the extensive preparations. It can be assumed that the perpetrators belonged to the NSDAP and are possibly to be found among the seven defendants of the post-war period. There is no evidence in the Heilbronn case of the involvement of external SA members, which has been proved elsewhere, but it cannot be ruled out either.

=== Whereabouts of the cult objects ===
There is no reliable information about the whereabouts of the cult objects (Torah scrolls, prayer straps, etc.). Statements by witnesses in this regard contradict each other and range from early removal to partial rescue to complete destruction. For example, one witness claims to have observed how the cult objects were carried "early" into the Oberamt (meaning the Oberamt building diagonally opposite). According to another witness, on the evening of November 10, Jewish religious objects were brought "at certain intervals" to the gymnastics room of the old Festhalle Harmonie in Heilbronn, including Torah scrolls, prayer straps, banners in Hebrew script and Jewish business books.

According to Hans Franke (1963), the Torah scrolls and other cult objects, some of which were set with precious stones, were valued at DM 8,000. One of the Heilbronn Torah scrolls is said to have been saved and is now in a synagogue in Baltimore.

In a letter dated May 9, 1962, the Heilbronn police director W. stated that he believed he remembered that the cult objects were kept in the attic of the Gestapo in Heilbronn (Wilhelmstraße 4) or at least were stored there for some time. For Schrenk, nothing is known for certain about the whereabouts of the cult objects; since almost no remains have been recovered so far, (Note: Status in 1988 and 1992.) it must be assumed that the destruction of the synagogue was also aimed at destroying the cult objects.

Attempts were made to obtain more precise information about the whereabouts of the cult objects via the applications for restitution filed by the Heilbronn Jewish institutions after World War II in accordance with the Federal Restitution Laws. Although there is evidence from sources (Note: In the Hauptstaatsarchiv Stuttgart, fonds J 3555, Bü V 252.) that such applications were filed, they can no longer be traced in the files of the responsible authorities. (Note: The State Office for Restitution Baden-Württemberg, the Mediator for Restitution at the Stuttgart District Court, the Stuttgart Chief Finance Directorate and the Federal Central Index (BZK) for applications under the Federal Compensation Act at the Düsseldorf State Pension Authority were consulted.) The restitution statistics only contain references to applications for securities and bank deposits, but not for furnishings or objects of worship.

== Memorials and remembrance ==
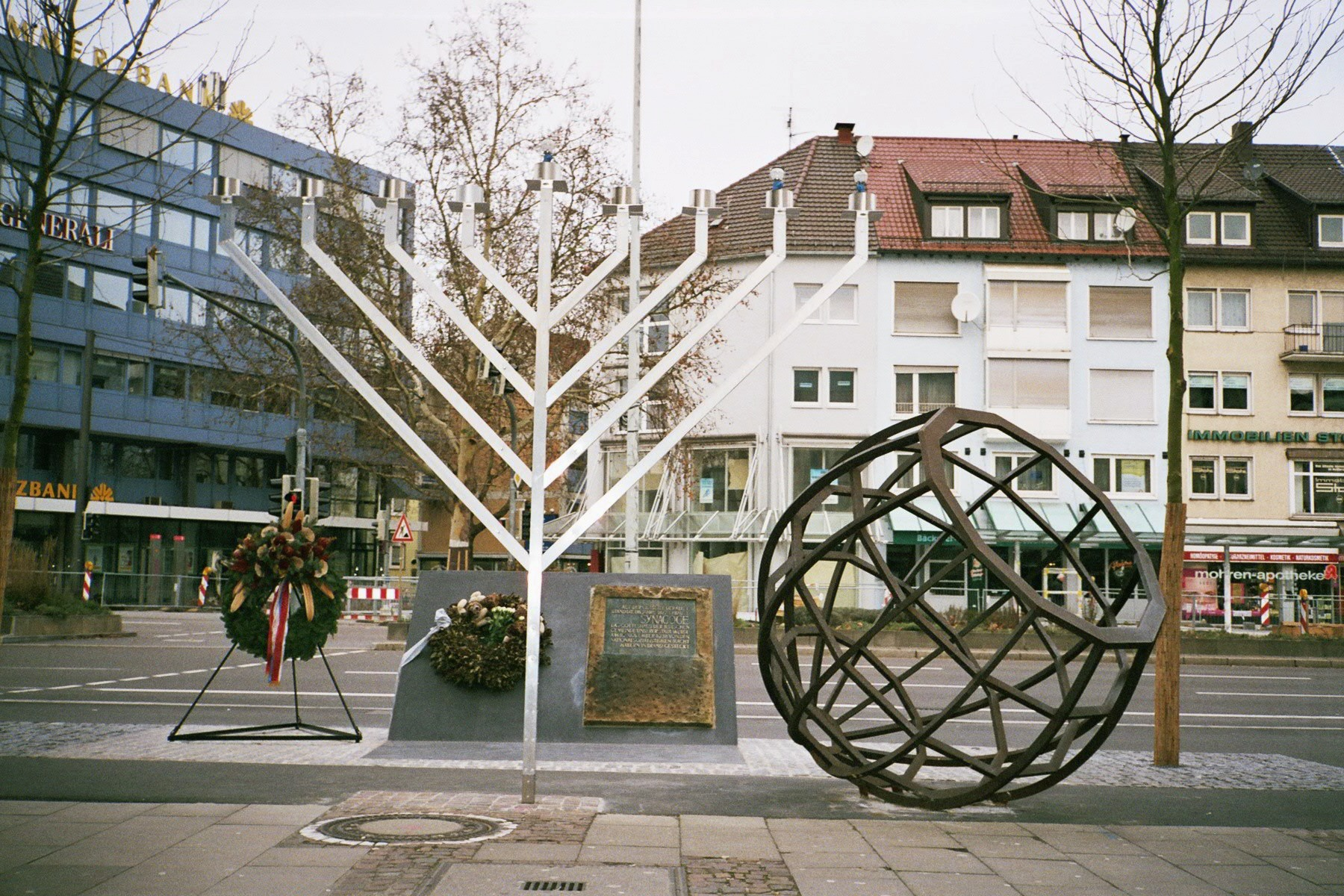
Dome memorial, synagogue memorial stone and Hanukkia

In 1960, Mayor Paul Meyle suggested that a memorial be created to mark the 25th anniversary of the synagogue fire in 1963. The city council's initial ideas included a plaque on the north wall of the Universum cinema to represent the burned synagogue. Later, a three-metre-high obelisk made of granite with a Star of David was considered, which was to be erected at the post office on the southern side of the crosswalk over the avenue.

Two years later, a memorial stone had still not been erected. Several alternatives were considered, which could be seen in the spring of 1965 in the form of dummies on the central reservation of the southern avenue in front of the Universum cinema, but none of them met with approval.

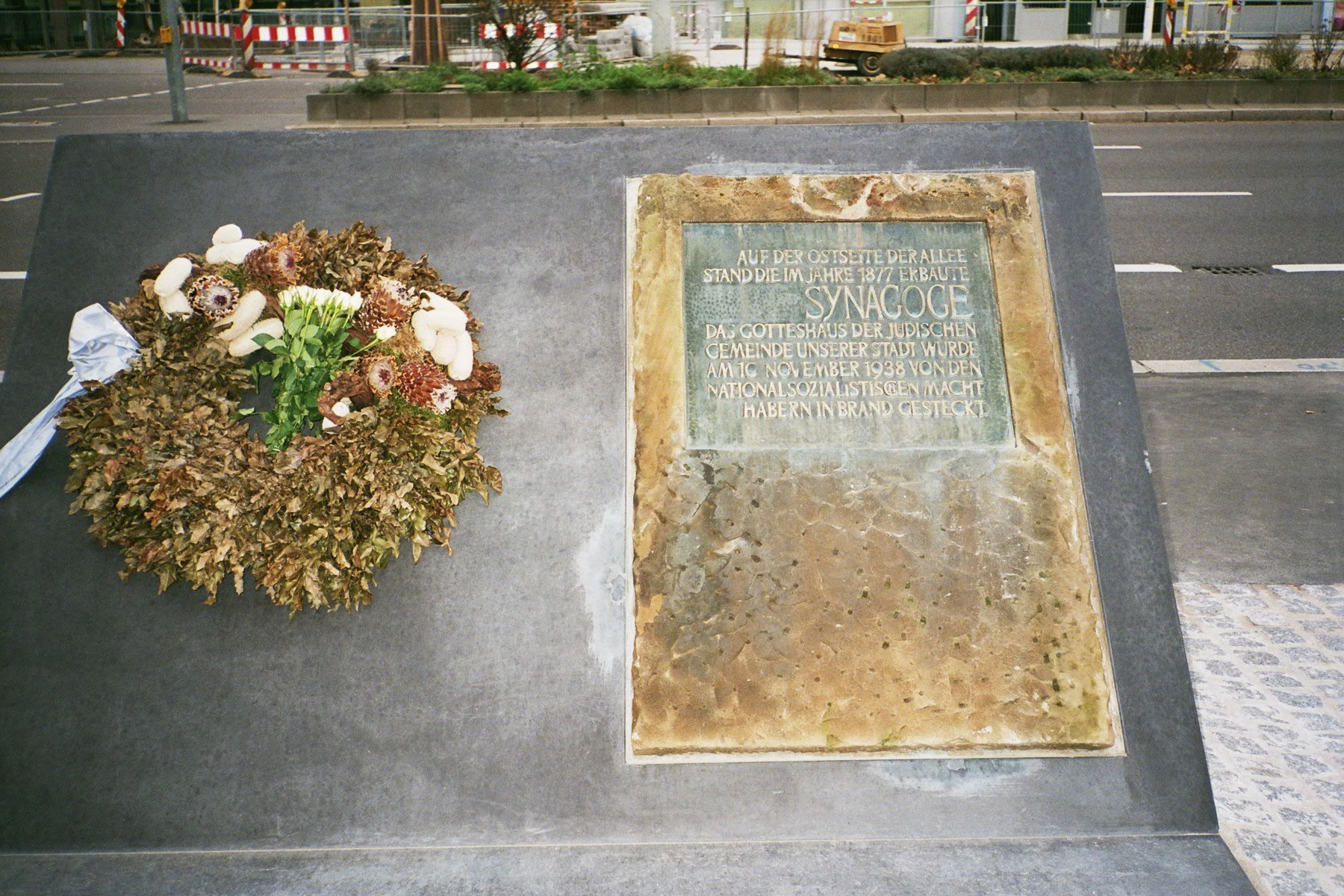
The synagogue memorial stone (end of 2009)

On November 9, 1966, a memorial stone with a bronze inscription plate was unveiled on the central reservation of the avenue. The 1.45 meter high, 90 centimetres wide and 30 centimetres deep memorial stone was carved by the sculptor Rückert; it is made of Heilbronn sandstone, the building material of the synagogue. The letters for the inscription on the 60 by 60 centimetre bronze plate were designed by the Heilbronn graphic artist and city councillor Gerhard Binder. The inscription refers to the synagogue once located here and the arson in 1938.

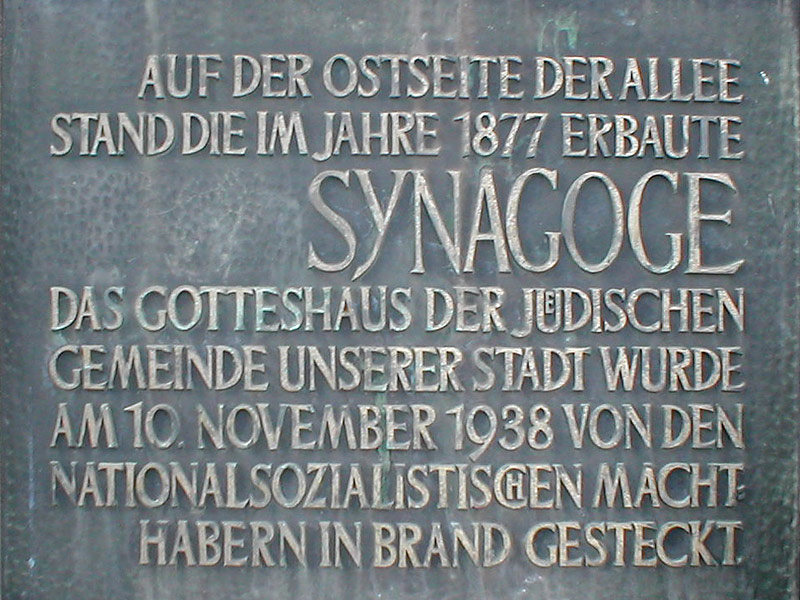
Inscription on the memorial plaque set into the stone

When the construction of the pedestrian underpass on the southern avenue began in 1978, the memorial stone was temporarily removed. After the end of the construction work in 1980, it was moved to the junction of the Synagogenweg, i.e. in the immediate vicinity of the former synagogue site, and incorporated into the concrete parapet of the post office underpass.

In 1982, the local newspaper reported on a letter to the editor by James May (Julius Mai), a Jew from Heilbronn who had emigrated to the US, who called for the "demolition of the current porn cinema and the stupid monument to the Jews at the entrance to these pleasure palaces" and the planting of an arboretum on the site of the former synagogue. The owners of the cinemas objected to May's choice of words "porn cinemas" and to his proposed demolition. The city council pointed out that it could not demolish other people's houses.

To mark the 50th anniversary of the November pogroms, a special stamp was issued in Israel on November 9, 1988, showing a picture of the Heilbronn synagogue in a burning book. The accompanying first day of issue card shows a photograph of the former Heilbronn synagogue. (Note: Image of the stamp here on the website of alemannia-judaica.de.)

In addition to the memorial plaque from 1966, the Dome Memorial by artist Bettina Bürkle, which was inaugurated on May 5, 1993, is intended to commemorate the destroyed synagogue in Heilbronn. The memorial consists of a metal skeleton in the shape of the toppled dome of the Heilbronn synagogue and is also located near the former site of the synagogue in front of the cinema building on Allee.

Following the closure of the Post Passage, a new memorial was created in October/November 2009 from the memorial stone and dome. The memorial stone is now located in an anthracite-colored concrete block. An opening for the Hanukkia was created in the ground in front of the concrete block - surrounded by paving stones - which is otherwise covered by a golden clasp. Bürkle's dome sculpture was placed next to the block at the junction with Synagogenweg. The ensemble was created in collaboration between the building department, the museum and the Jewish community of Heilbronn.

A private individual created a virtual reconstruction of the exterior of the building based on the synagogue building plans, which has been shown on the internet since 2010.

== Gallery ==
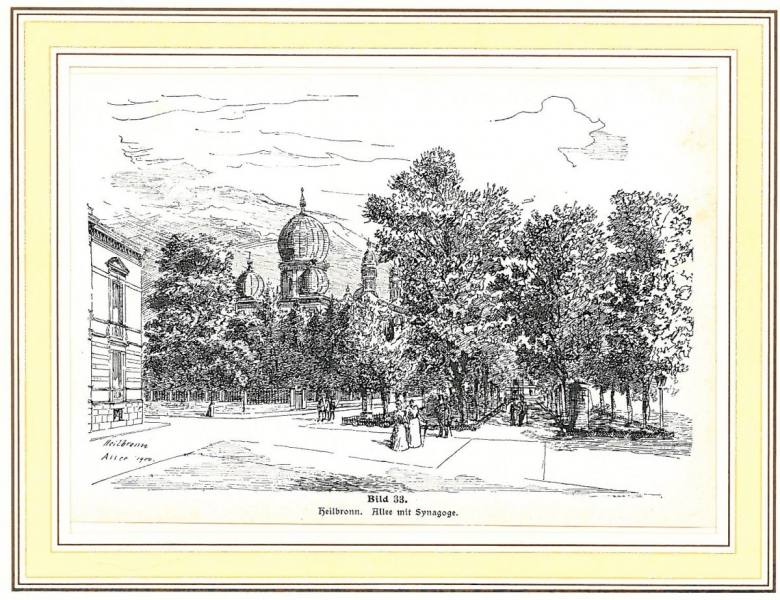
View along Heilbronner Allee with synagogue (Vinzenz de Pay, Riedlingen)

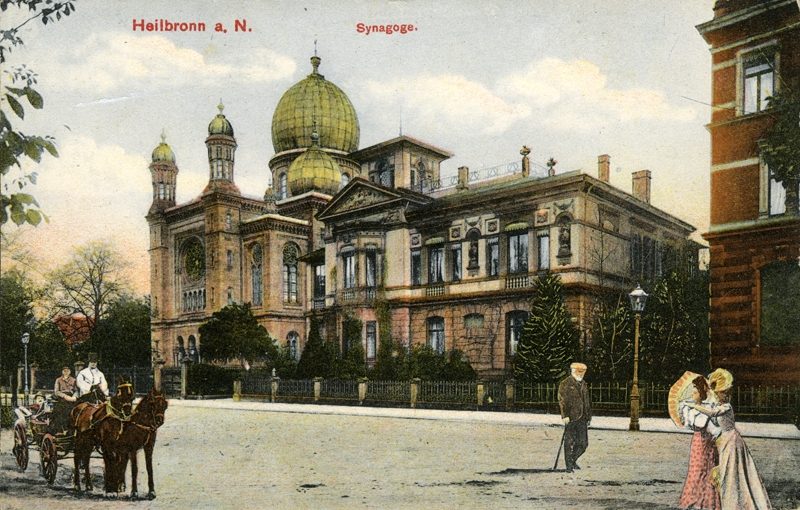
View along the avenue to the north, around 1900. In the center of the picture, to the right of the synagogue, the Villa Gfrörer.

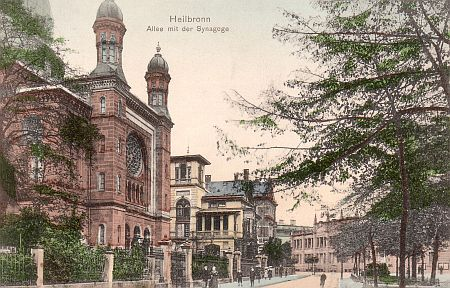
View along Heilbronner Allee to the south. The synagogue in the left foreground, behind it the Villa Gfrörer (1908).

== See also ==
- History of the Jews in Germany
- List of synagogues in Germany (in German)

== Bibliography ==
- Franke, Hans (2009) [1963]. Geschichte und Schicksal der Juden in Heilbronn. Vom Mittelalter bis zur Zeit der nationalsozialistischen Verfolgungen (1050–1945) (PDF) (in German). Heilbronn: Stadtarchiv Heilbronn. ISBN 3928990047.
- Hahn, Joachim; Krüger, Jürgen (2007). Synagogen in Baden-Württemberg (in German). Vol. 1, 2. Stuttgart: Theiss. ISBN 9783806218435.
- Hammer-Schenk, Harold (1981). Synagogen in Deutschland. Geschichte einer Baugattung im 19. u. 20.Jahrhundert (in German). Vol. 1, 2. Hamburg: Hans Christians Verlag.
- Holthuis, Gabriele (2022). "Die Synagoge in Heilbronn "Eine wirklich neue und erhebliche Sehenswürdigkeit".". Jüdisches Leben in Heilbronn. Skizzen einer tausendjährigen Geschichte (in German). Heilbronn: Stadtarchiv Heilbronn. pp. 99–150. ISBN 9783940646347.
- Künzl, Hannelore (1984). Islamische Stilelemente im Synagogenbau des 19. und frühen 20. Jahrhunderts (in German). Frankfurt am Main: Verlag Peter Lang. pp. 334–337. ISBN 382048034X.
- Schrenk, Christhard (1992). "Die Chronologie der sogenannten „Reichskristallnacht" in Heilbronn". Jahrbuch für schwäbisch-fränkische Geschichte 32 (in German). Heilbronn: Historischer Verein Heilbronn. pp. 293–314.
