= Great Synagogue (Oświęcim) =

Destroyed synagogue in Oświęcim, Poland

- Polish: Wielka Synagoga w Oświęcimiu
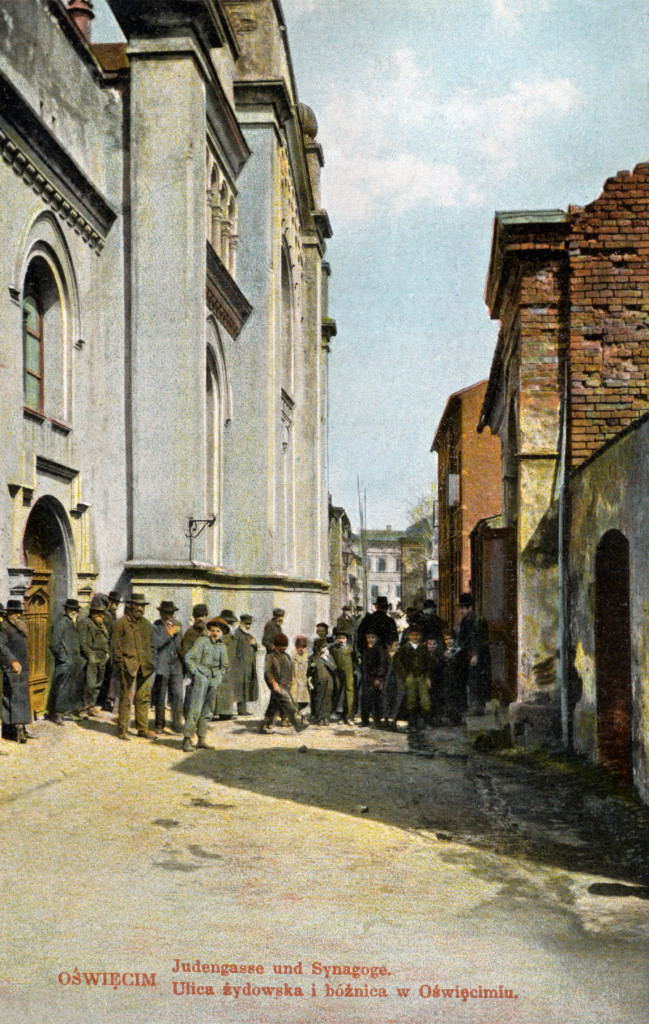
- The former synagogue, c. 1900

- Location of the destroyed synagogue in Lesser Poland Voivodeship

Religion
- Affiliation: Orthodox Judaism (former)
- Ecclesiastical or organizational status: Synagogue (1873–1939)
- Status: Destroyed

Location
- Location: Oświęcim, Lesser Poland Voivodeship
- Country: Poland
- Interactive map of Great Synagogue
- Coordinates: 50°00′N 19°12′E

Architecture
- Architect: Carl Korn
- Type: Synagogue architecture
- Style: Romanesque Revival; Gothic Revival; Moorish Revival; Rundbogenstil
- Established: c. 1588 (as a congregation)
- Completed: 1873
- Destroyed: 29–30 November 1939
- Materials: Brick

The Great Synagogue (Polish: Wielka Synagoga w Oświęcimiu) was a former Orthodox Jewish congregation and synagogue, that was located in Oświęcim (German: Auschwitz), in the Lesser Poland Voivodeship of Poland. Designed by Carl Korn and completed in 1873, the synagogue served as a house of prayer until World War II when it was destroyed by Nazis in November 1939.

== History ==
=== Old synagogue ===
The first mention of a Jewish congregation in Oświęcim dates from 1588, when the congregation was probably established. Archival documents suggest that a townsman from Oświęcim, Jan Piotraszewski, gave or sold his land to the local Jewish community so that they could build their temple and cemetery. The first building was likely a wooden synagogue, that was probably destroyed during the Swedish deluge.

Over the centuries the building was twice destroyed by fire. The first time was on July 6, 1711. After this fire, a stone temple was constructed. Another fire damaged the building in 1863.

=== Great Synagogue ===
The last synagogue, the Great Synagogue, was built in 1873 after the last fire on the site of the pre-existing synagogue. Between 1899 and 1900 it was redesigned and rebuilt by the architect Carl Korn. The building received a representative, richly decorated facade with elements of Romanesque Revival, Gothic Revival, Moorish Revival and Rundbogenstil styles. The façade of the building was maintained in a representative style, similarly to other synagogues designed by Korn. The synagogue was the first building in the city to have electrical lighting installed; the lights were first switched on in 1925.

The temple was demolished on the night of 29–30 November 1939 by the Nazi soldiers. In 1941, its ruins were demolished, and the area was used to build air-raid shelters.

=== After World War II ===
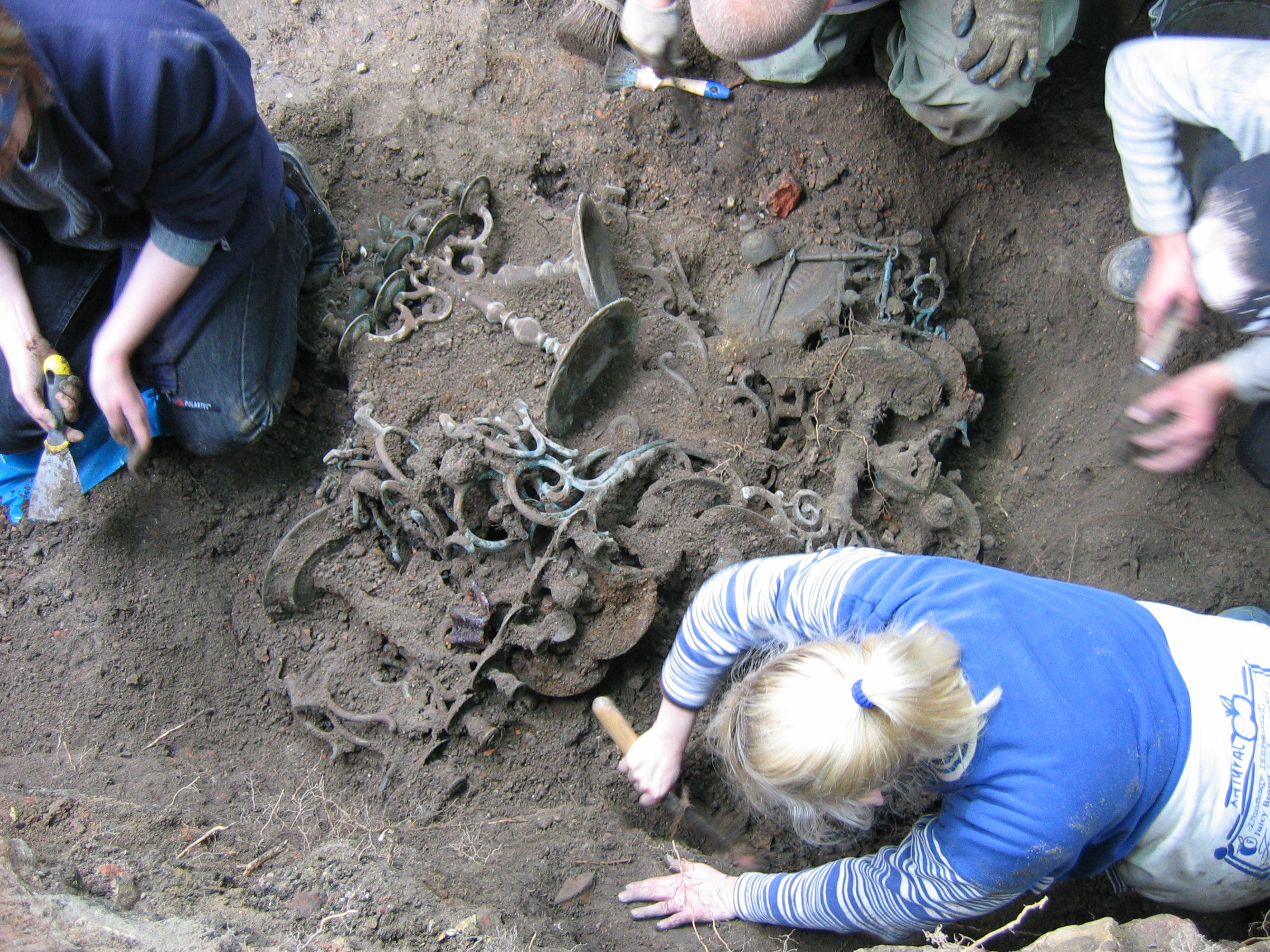
Excavations at the Synagogue site

After the war, the synagogue was not rebuilt. The place where it was standing was left empty for years, as a testimony to the events of the war.

In 2004, archaeological excavations were carried out on the former synagogue site . Approximately 400 objects were found during the works, called the Oświęcim Treasure, comprising the equipment of the synagogue – including chandeliers, copper Ner tamid lamps, fragments of furniture and ornaments, decorative floor tiles, marble elements of the Aron Kodesh, a ceremonial dish for washing hands, charred fragments of prayer books and commemorative plaques. Most items dated from the second half of the 19th century. The discovery was transferred to the Auschwitz Jewish Center in Oświęcim, where the artefacts were catalogued, inventoried and restored. Some items are on display at the permanent exhibition at the Center's Jewish Museum.

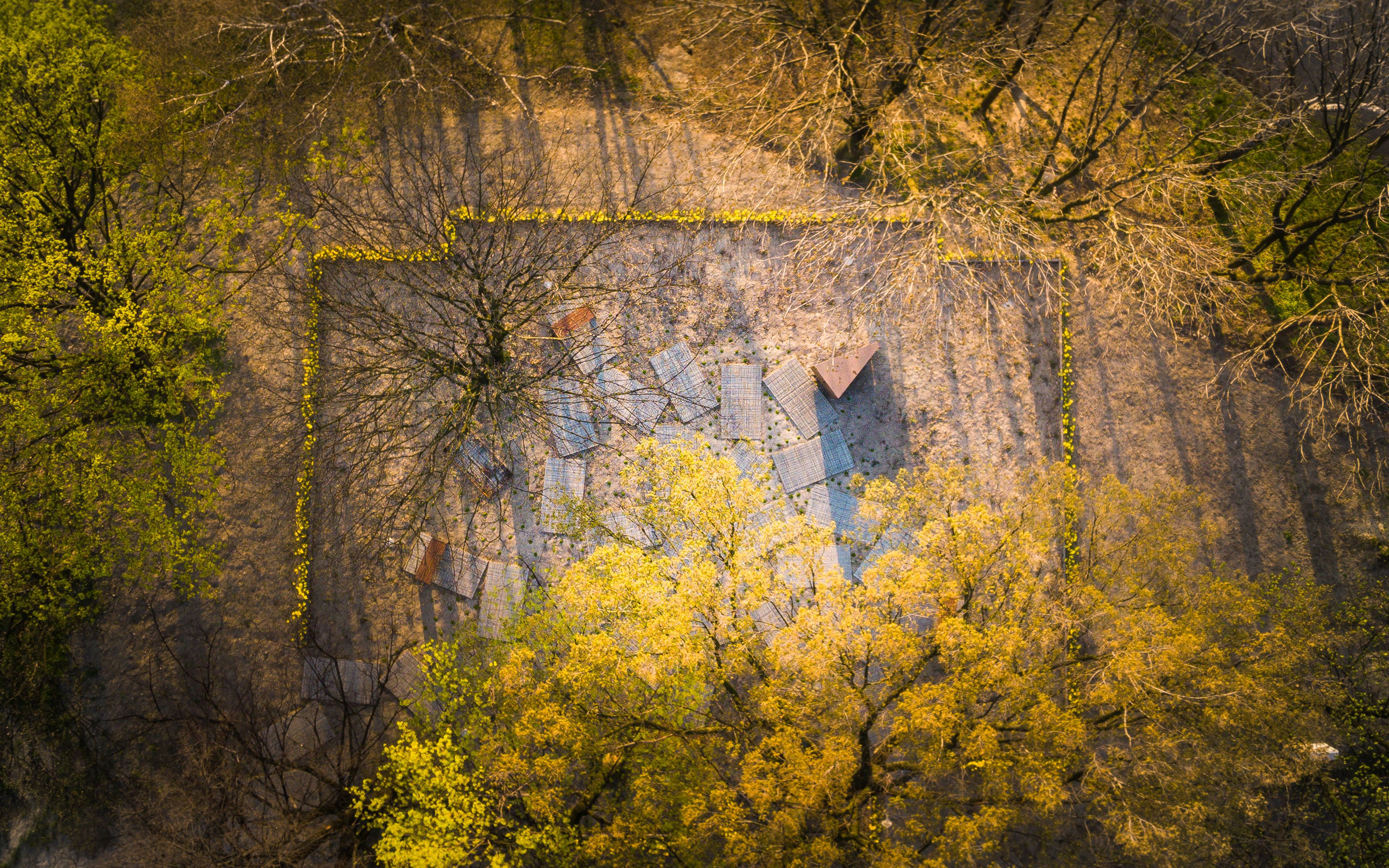
The Great Synagogue Memorial Park seen from above

Nearly 80 years after the destruction of the synagogue, the inhabitants of Oświęcim decided to establish a Great Synagogue Memorial Park on the site as a place of commemoration and reflection. The project was initiated by the Auschwitz Jewish Center in Oświęcim and was carried out thanks to a fundraiser that was attended by residents, local entrepreneurs, public institutions, and descendants of Oświęcim Jews. The park was opened on November 28, 2019.

=== History of the religious community ===
The beginning of the Jewish settlement in Oświęcim officially began in the first half of the 16th century, so before the World War II, the community was over 400 years old. It is possible that earlier there were Jewish inhabitants in the city, because of the trade routes and near other trade centres, but it has not been confirmed by documents.

Initially, the centre of Jewish life was located in the northern part of the town, but in time the community moved and settled in the southern part. The area of Oświęcim castle and Żydowska Street (today, Berka Joselewicza Street) became the central area of Jewish life. According to the research of Artur Szyndler, Jews lived also in other parts of the city. The beginning of the 20th century was a period of prosperity for the Jewish community and the entire town. There were very prosperous factories in the city producing paper, chemical products and other goods.

The Great Synagogue was attended mainly by representatives of the progressive Jewish intelligentsia (including doctors, lawyers, entrepreneurs and officials), and to a limited extent also traditionalists. The synagogue, with 2,000 places, was known as the Great Synagogue as it had a representative function for the local Jewish community. The magnificent temple building was visible in the city skyline and symbolized the importance of the Jewish community. The religious life of the Jewish community of Oświęcim focused around the synagogue. The main rabbis of the Jewish community in Oświęcim who held services in the synagogue in the years 1873–1939 were: Lazar Münz, Szlomo Halberstam, Abraham Schnur, Osias Pinkas Bombach and his last son, Eliasz Bombach.

Before the Second World War, more than the half of Oświęcim's population was Jewish. There were around 20 synagogues in the city.

== Architecture ==
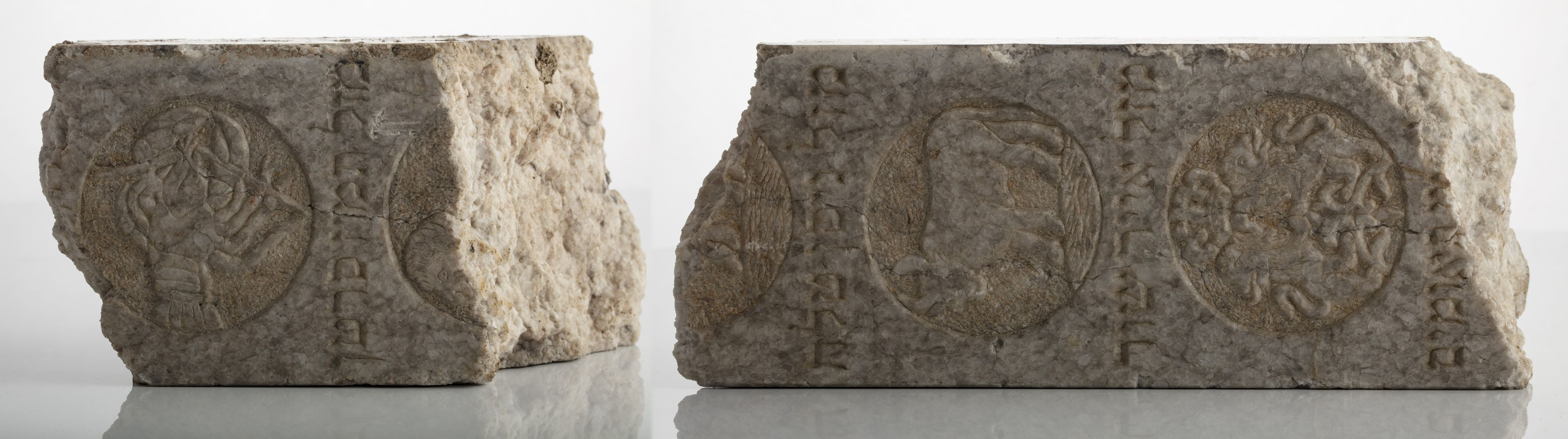
Marble elements featuring signs of the zodiac from the Great Synagogue in Oświęcim

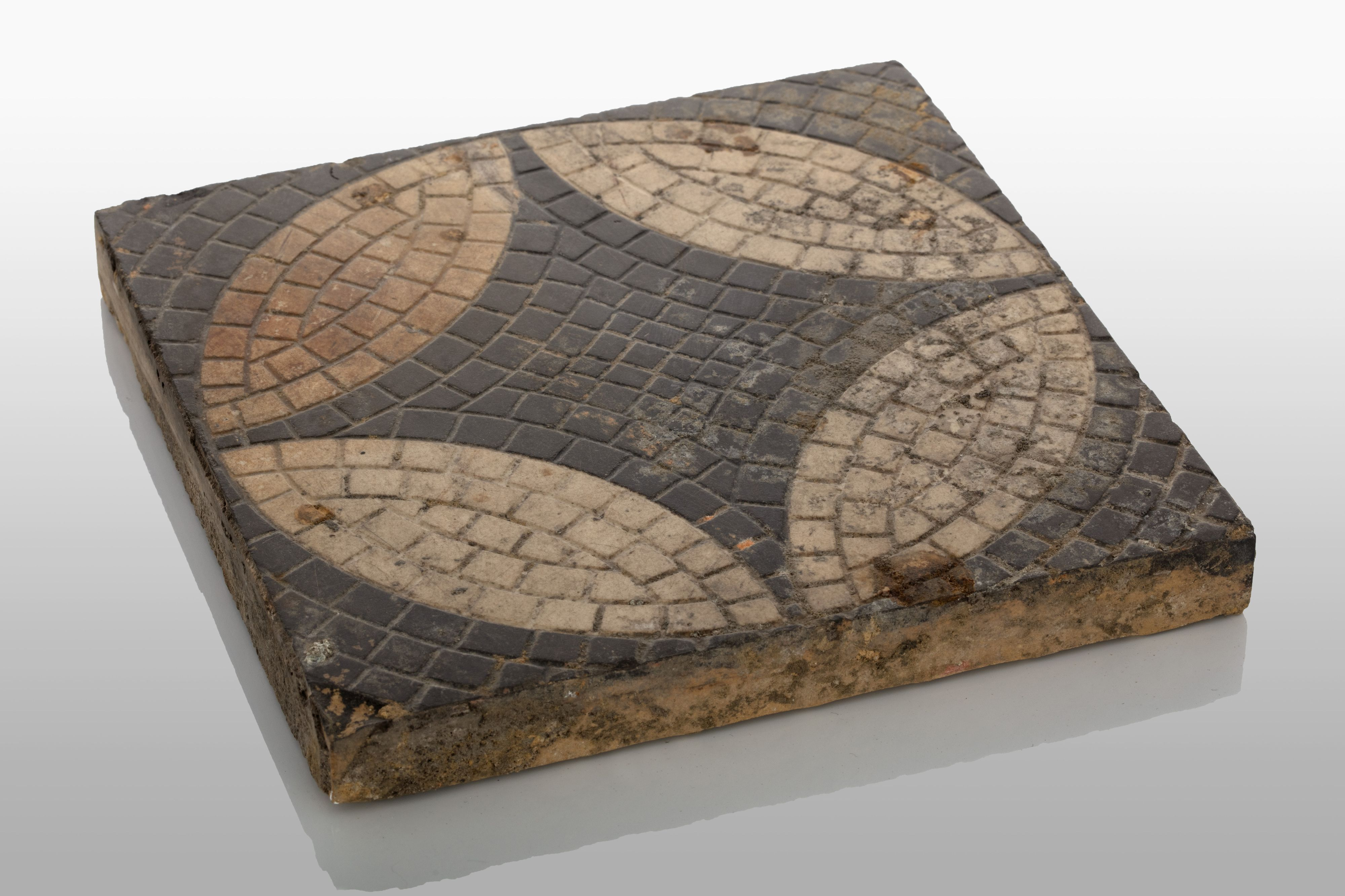
Decorative floor tiles from the Great Synagogue in Oświęcim

The appearance of the synagogue before the reconstruction that ended in 1900 and the interior is unknown because no photographs or architectural plans have survived.

The new design of the building was planned by Carl Korn between 1899 and 1900. The design is known from surviving photographs from the early 20th century. Korn was a well-known Polish architect from Bielsko who also designed Biała and Wadowice synagogues.

The brick synagogue building was erected on a rectangular plan. Inside was a vestibule from which one could enter the main prayer hall. It was surrounded on three sides by galleries for women, to which separate entrances and staircases led. Inside there were 2000 seats. At the beginning of the 20th century, annexes to the north and to the south were added, filling the empty space on a slope on which the synagogue had been erected.

The synagogue had a representative, richly ornamented facade with elements of Romanesque Revival, Gothic Revival, Moorish Revival and Rundbogenstil styles. The details of the decoration referred to the ornamentation of the Tempel Synagogue in Miodowa Street in Kraków. Other inspirations for its architectural from could be seen in German architecture, e.g. the Hamburg synagogue of Albrecht Rosengarten. The building was crowned with two onion-shaped domes.

A description of the interior of the synagogue can be found in a conversation with a Jew from Oświęcim, Manheimer:

The inside of the synagogue was decorated with splendid paintings. The domed ceiling was painted to resemble the blue skies, in which golden stars were strewn. Around the sky were depicted the signs of the zodiac and biblical musical instruments. In the center of the synagogue there was a green colored platform, the Holy Ark and the Lectern were made of elegant white marble.

== See also ==
- History of the Jews in Poland
- List of active synagogues in Poland
- Oświęcim Treasure
- The Great Synagogue Memorial Park in Oświęcim
