= New Synagogue (Opole) =

Former Reform synagogue in Oppeln, Germany; now Poland

New Synagogue in Oppeln
- German: Neue Synagoge Oppeln; Polish: Nowa Synagoga w Opolu
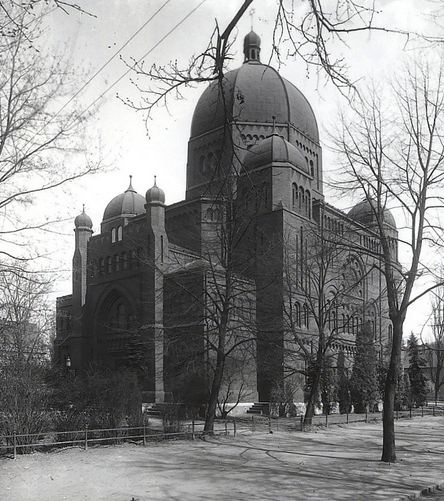
- The former synagoge in the 19th century

- Location of the former synagogue in Germany, as it was in 1937

Religion
- Affiliation: Reform Judaism (former)
- Rite: Nusach Ashkenaz
- Ecclesiastical or organizational status: Synagogue (1897–1938)
- Status: Destroyed

Location
- Location: Oppeln
- Country: Germany (now Poland)
- Interactive map of New Synagogue in Oppeln
- Coordinates: 50°39′59″N 17°55′15″E

Architecture
- Architect: Felix Henry
- Type: Synagogue architecture
- Style: Moorish Revival
- Completed: 1897
- Destroyed: November 1938 (during Kristallnacht)

Specifications
- Capacity: 600 seats
- Dome: Four (maybe more)

The New Synagogue (German: Neue Synagoge Oppeln; Polish: Nowa Synagoga w Opolu) was a former Reform Jewish congregation and synagogue, located in Oppeln, Germany (today Opole, Poland). The synagogue was destroyed by Nazis on November 9, 1938, during Kristallnacht.

Designed by Felix Henry in the Moorish Revival style, the synagogue was built in 1893–1897. The New Synagogue replaced the Old Synagogue in Opole, located at 1 Szpitalna Street, designed by Henry in the Rundbogenstil style, and completed in 1841. The Old Synagogue is still standing, although used for commercial purposes since 1897.

During the Kristallnacht on 9–10 November 1938, Nazis forced rabbi Hans Hirschberg to set the New Synagogue building on fire.

== Gallery ==
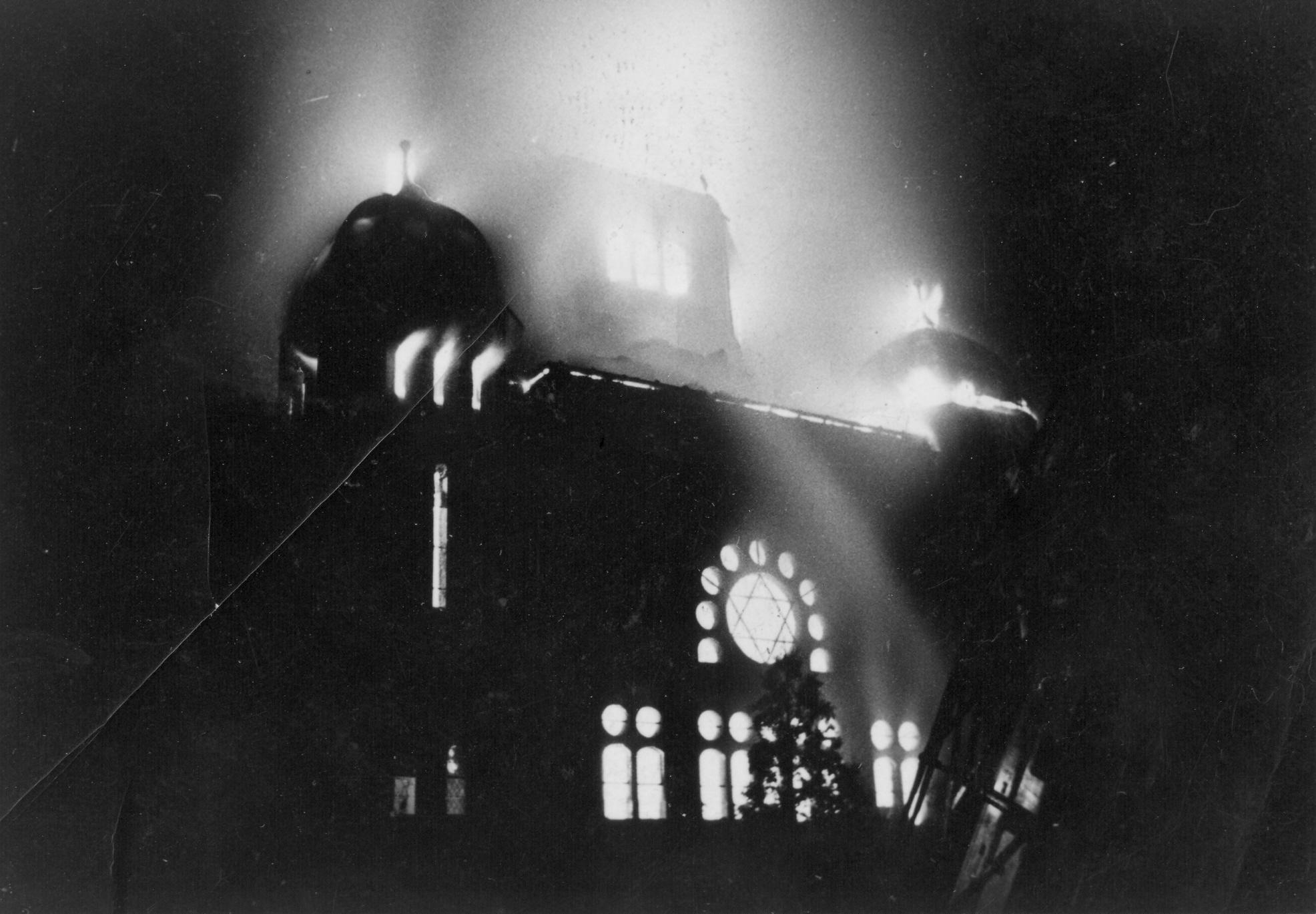
The synagogue on Kristallnacht

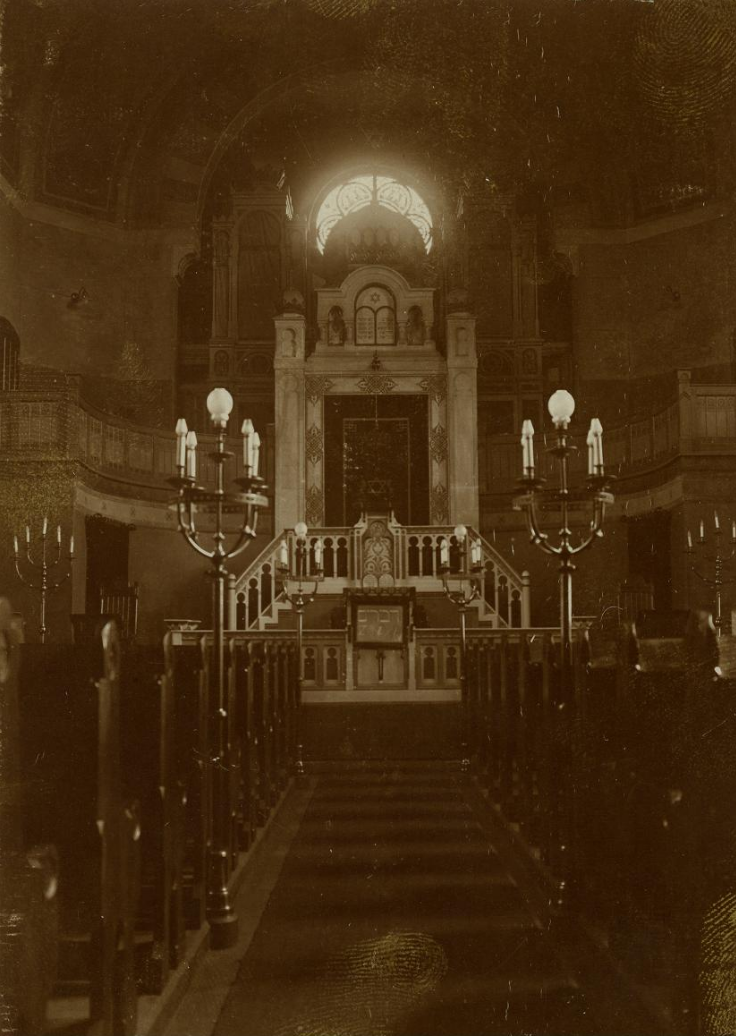
The interior of the former synagogue

== See also ==
- History of the Jews in Germany
- History of the Jews in Poland
- List of synagogues in Germany (in German)
- List of synagogues in Poland
