= List of choral synagogues =

Choral synagogues (Yiddish: Khorshul) were built in Eastern Europe, from Hungary to Russia. These synagogues represented the ideas of Jewish Enlightenment (Haskalah) and made certain reforms to the traditional Jewish customs (minhag). Often, they featured male choruses, conducted sermons in local languages (German, Russian, etc.), enforced order during services, decorated their interior, and placed pews facing eastern wall where the Torah ark was displayed (in traditionalist synagogues the bimah stood in the center of the room). However, the changes did not extend to religious beliefs and customs. Therefore, the differences between choral and traditional synagogues are more aesthetic.

Many of these synagogues were either demolished or confiscated and repurposed for other uses, particularly in the Soviet Union by the Bolsheviks after the October Revolution. During the German occupation in the Second World War, many were demolished by the Nazis or destroyed in battles and bombing raids.

Some of the surviving synagogues were renovated and returned to the local Jewish communities, particularly after the fall of Communism and the collapse of the Soviet Union, while the others are used for other purposes or are in ruins.

== Active choral synagogues ==
- Moscow Choral Synagogue of Moscow
- Grand Choral Synagogue of St. Petersburg
- Great Choral Synagogue of Kyiv
- Brodsky Choral Synagogue of Kyiv
- Kharkiv Choral Synagogue
- Choral Synagogue of Drohobych
- Great Synagogue of Grodno
- Vilnius Choral Synagogue of Vilnius
- Kaunas Choral Synagogue of Kaunas
- Templul Coral in Bucharest
- Great Choral Synagogue of Odesa
- Golden Rose Synagogue (Dnipro)

== Defunct choral synagogues ==
- Great Choral Synagogue of Riga (burned in 1941)
- Great Choral Synagogue of Daugavpils
- Great Choral Synagogue of Šiauliai
- Choral Synagogue in Samara (closed in 1929, being restored)
- Choral Synagogue in Smolensk (occupied by a school)
- Choral Synagogue in Białystok (burned during the liquidation of the Białystok Ghetto)
- Choral Synagogue in Vitebsk (closed in 1929, destroyed during World War II)
- Choral Synagogue in Minsk (occupied by a theater)
- Choral Synagogue in Brest
- Choral Synagogue of Liepāja
- Choral Synagogue in Chișinău
- Choral Synagogue in Tallinn (destroyed during bombing in 1944)

== See also ==
- Choral Synagogue (disambiguation)
