= Choral Synagogue =

Choral Synagogue may refer to:

== Belarus ==
- Choral Synagogue (Brest)

== Latvia ==
- Great Choral Synagogue (Riga)

== Lithuania ==
- Kaunas Synagogue (Kaunas)
- Choral Synagogue (Vilnius)

== Romania ==
- Choral Temple (Bucharest)

== Russia ==
- Moscow Choral Synagogue (Moscow)
- Main Choral Synagogue (Rostov-on-Don)
- Choral Synagogue (Smolensk)
- Grand Choral Synagogue (St. Petersburg)

== Ukraine ==
- Choral Synagogue (Bila Tserkva)
- Golden Rose Synagogue (Dnipro)
- Choral Synagogue (Drohobych)
- Kharkiv Choral Synagogue (Kharkiv)
- Brodsky Choral Synagogue (Kyiv)
- Great Choral Synagogue (Kyiv)

== See also ==
- List of choral synagogues
- Great Synagogue
