= Pińsk Ghetto =

Nazi ghetto in occupied Belarus

- Nazi ghetto
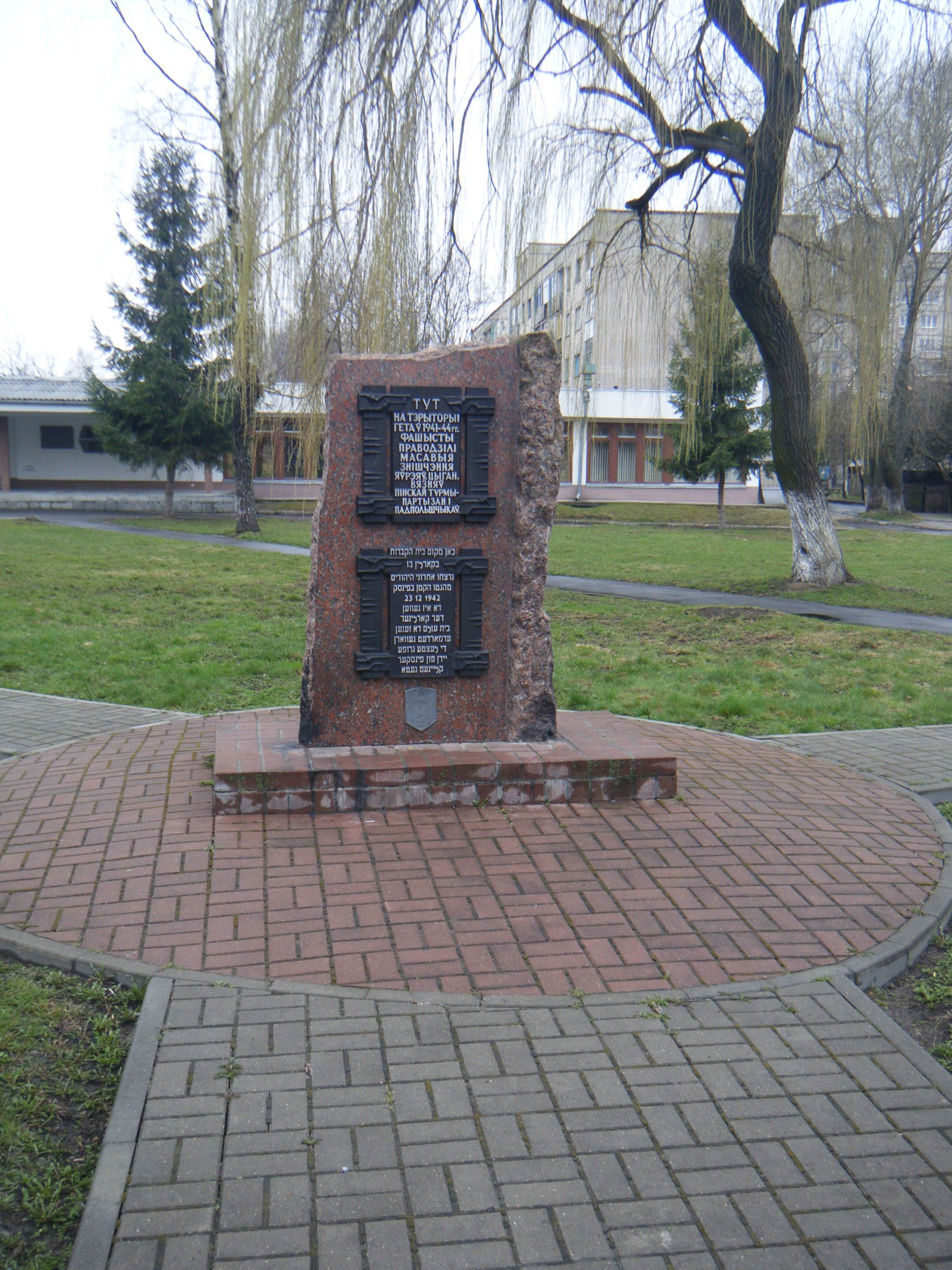
- Memorial at the site of the mass murder of Jews in the Pińsk ghetto during the Holocaust

- Location of Pińsk Ghetto in modern day Belarus
- Coordinates: 52°07′N 26°6′E
- Known for: The Holocaust in Poland
- Location: Pińsk, German-occupied Poland
- Operated by: SS
- Operational: 1 May 1942 – 29 Oct 1942

The Pińsk Ghetto (Polish: Getto w Pińsku; Belarusian: Пінскае гета) was a Nazi ghetto created by Nazi Germany for the confinement of Jews living in the city of Pińsk, Western Belarus, German-occupied Poland. Pińsk, located in eastern Poland, was occupied by the Red Army in 1939 and incorporated into the Byelorussian SSR. The city was captured by the Wehrmacht in Operation Barbarossa in July 1941; it was incorporated into the German Reichskommissariat Ukraine in autumn of 1941.

In the 5–7 August 1941 massacre, 8,000 Jews were murdered just outside of Pińsk. The subsequent creation of the ghetto was followed – over a year later – by the murder of the imprisoned Jewish population of Pińsk, totalling 26,000 victims: men, women and children. Most killings took place between 29 October and 1 November 1942 by Police Battalion 306 of the German Order Police, and other units. It was the second largest mass shooting operation in a single settlement to that particular date during the Holocaust, (Note: Popular Polish writer Ryszard Kapuściński born and raised in Pińsk, in his interview for Przekrój magazine in 2003 noted that the ghetto in Pińsk was only second after Babi Yar in the number of Jews shot by the Nazis in a single getto liquidation action. The number quoted by Kapuściński is 26,000. See section of Kapuściński's interview: "rodzice uczyli w pińskim powszechniaku" (trans.: parents were the school teachers). Other historians such as Christopher Browning inform that the Babi Yar death toll was at least 33,000. It was also Christopher Browning (Ordinary Men) who compared the Babi Yar death toll to Erntefest, the single largest German killing operation against Jews in history.) after Babi Yar where the death toll exceeded 33,000 Jews. The Babi Yar shootings were surpassed only by the Nazi Aktion Erntefest of 3 November 1943 in the Lublin district with 42,000–43,000 Jews murdered at once over execution pits, dug specifically for this purpose.

== Background ==
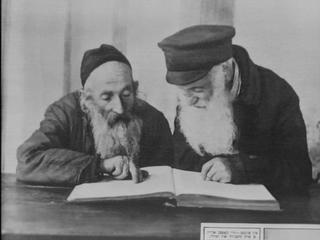
Religious Jews of Pińsk in 1924

Poland gained independence at the end of World War I. In the April 1919 Pinsk massacre, during the Polish–Soviet War, the Polish garrison summarily executed 35 Jewish men without due process on the suspicion of plotting a pro-Soviet counterattack.

In the subsequent decade the city grew to 23,497 inhabitants as part of the Polesie Voivodeship in the Second Polish Republic. It was briefly declared the capital of the province in 1921 but a citywide fire resulted in the transfer of power to Brześć within months. Jews constituted over half the number of Pińsk residents, and 17.7% of the general population in the region. New Jewish schools were opened, as well as a clinic, a bank, an old-age home, and an orphanage.

In 1939, following the Soviet invasion of Poland in accordance with the Molotov–Ribbentrop Pact, Pińsk and the surrounding territories were taken over by the Soviet Union. The NKVD secret police conducted raids and shut down all synagogues and shops. Mass deportations to Siberia followed. At that time, the population became over 90% Jewish due to the influx of refugees from German-controlled western Poland. The area was annexed into the Soviet Byelorussian Republic after the Elections to the People's Assemblies of Western Ukraine and Western Belarus conducted in an atmosphere of terror.

== German occupation ==
On 22 June 1941 Germany invaded the Soviet Union in Operation Barbarossa. Advance forces of the Wehrmacht entered Pinsk on 4 July 1941. Christian inhabitants welcomed the German army as liberators from the Soviet regime, greeting them with bread and flowers. Under new anti-semitic regulations, Jews were forbidden to leave the city or shop in the market and were required to wear armbands with the Star of David. Random killings, beatings, looting, requisitions, and abduction of Jews for forced labour took place.

A Judenrat (Jewish Council) was formed on 30 July 1941. On the night of 4 August, 300 Jews were detained in order to compel the council to assemble Jews between the ages of 16 and 60, ostensibly for a labour detail. Thousands of men were marched out of the town and shot in prepared trenches. In the next two days, the Germans rounded up additional Jews, including younger boys and some women, who were also shot. By 8 August 1941, 8,000 Jews were murdered in this manner.

== Ghetto resistance and liquidation ==
The ghetto in Pińsk existed only for half a year, officially between 20 April and 29 October 1942, much shorter than most Jewish ghettos in German-occupied Poland. The relocation action took place on 1 May 1942. Food was rationed, and a barbed-wire fence erected. The following month, in June 1942, the first murder operation took place there, with 3,500 Jews rounded up in Pińsk and nearby Kobryń, and transported to Bronna Góra (the Bronna Mount) to be shot. This was the location of secluded massacres of Jews transported by Holocaust trains from the Brześć Ghetto as well.

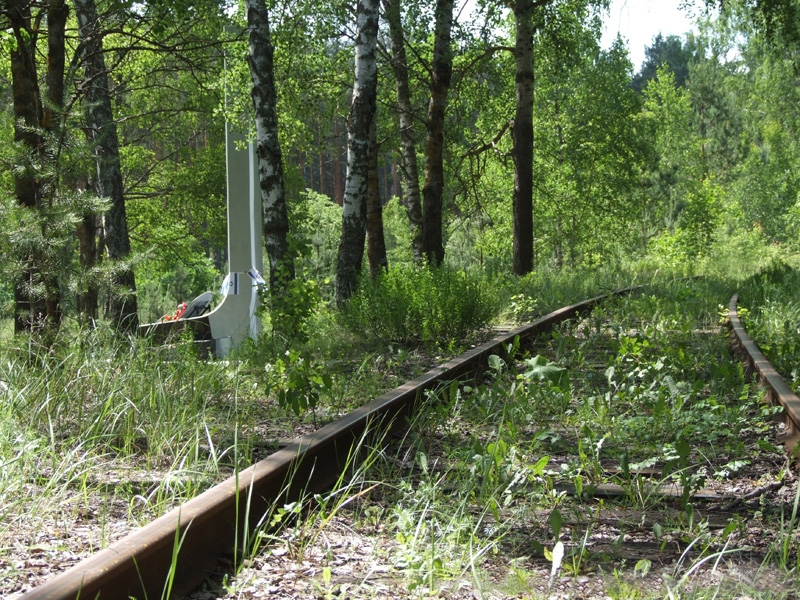
Old railway line near Bronna Góra, present-day Belarus, with marked location of mass killings of Jews

The Pińsk Ghetto's population swelled, with Jews deported en masse from all neighbouring settlements until food ran out. The liquidation of the ghetto began on 28 October 1942. The German motorized battalion met armed resistance from underground fighters, which came as a complete shock to the German police. The insurgents were shooting from secretly set-up bunkers, so reinforcements were brought in to continue the ghetto liquidation. According to the Nazi-issued final report, 17,000 Jews were killed during the insurgency, bringing the total to 26,200 victims before the ghetto's closure. Ten thousand were murdered in one day and the rest on the next day, with few managing to escape into the forest. The ghetto ceased to exist entirely. Not a single house was burned down.

After the war, Poland's borders were redrawn and Pinsk became part of the Soviet Union. Some of the Jews who survived the Holocaust returned, but they were prohibited from reopening a synagogue. In the 1970s and 1980s, most of them emigrated. Pinsk became part of independent Belarus in 1991 after the collapse of the Soviet Union. By 1999, only 317 Jews lived in the city.

== See also ==
- Łachwa Ghetto uprising
- The emergence of West Belarus
- Wacław Kopisto 1943 liberation of the Pińsk prison
- Polesia region of East European Plain
