= Bronna Góra =

Mass killing site in Belarus

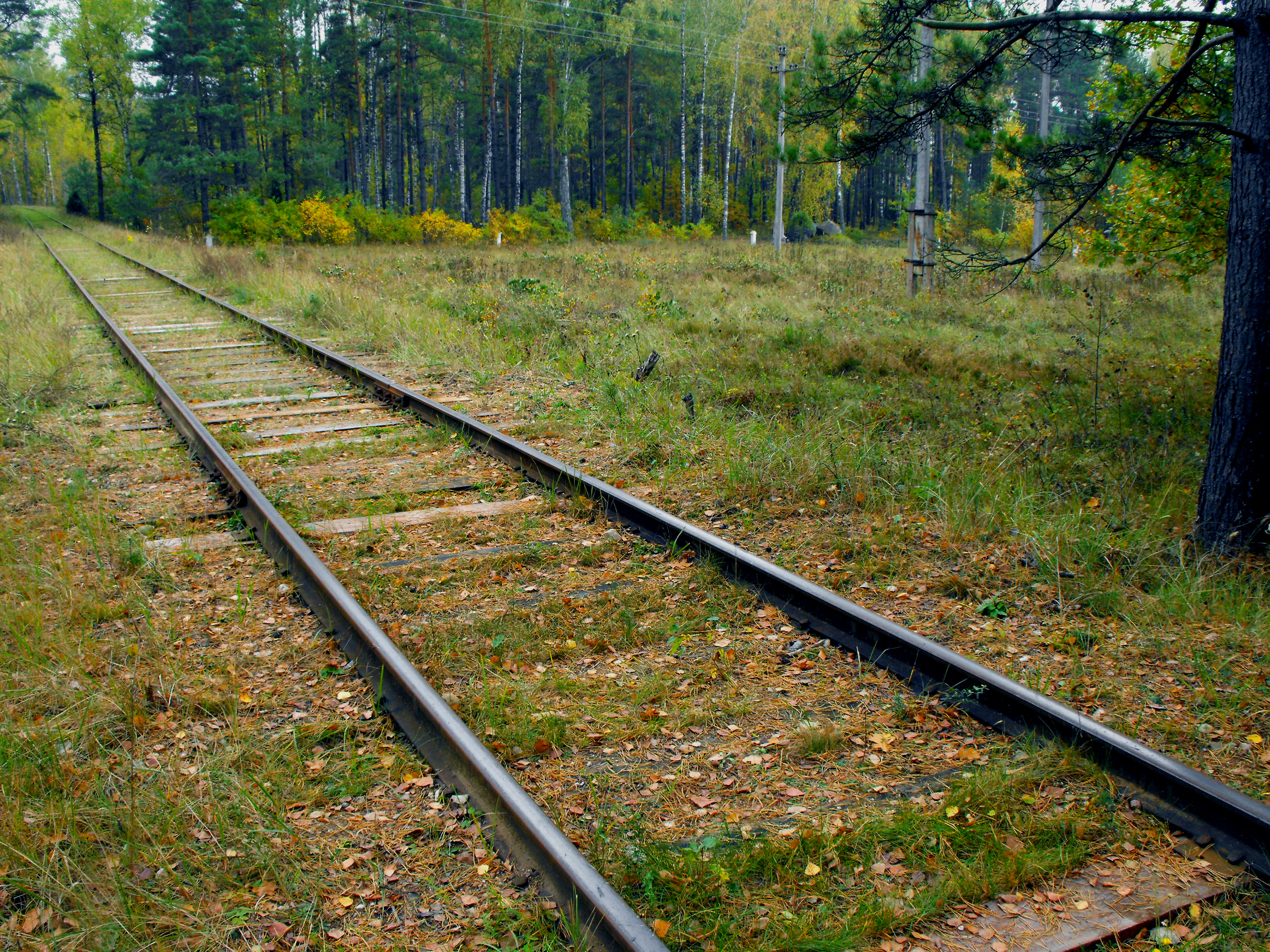
- Old train tracks leading to location of forest massacres at Bronna Góra

- Location of Bronna Góra in World War II, (northeast of Sobibor extermination camp)

- Location of Bronna Góra in modern day Belarus (see above)
- Location: Bronna Góra, Polesie Voivodeship, occupied Second Polish Republic; 52°36′7″N 25°4′46″E
- Date: May 1942 – November 1942
- Incident type: Mass killings over execution pits dug in the forest
- Perpetrators: Schutzstaffel (SS)
- Participants: SS-Totenkopfverbände (SS-TV)
- Ghetto: Brześć, Bereza, Janów Poleski, Kobryn, Horodec (pl), Pińsk Ghetto
- Victims: 50,000 Jews
- Notes: The Holocaust in Poland

Bronna Góra (or Bronna Mount in English, Belarusian: Бронная Гара, Bronnaja Hara) is the name of a secluded area in present-day Belarus where mass killings of Polish Jews were carried out by Nazi Germany during World War II. The location was part of the eastern half of occupied Poland, which had been invaded by the Soviet Union in 1939 in agreement with Germany, and two years later captured by the Wehrmacht in Operation Barbarossa. It is estimated that from May 1942 until November of that year, during the most deadly phase of the Holocaust in Poland, some 50,000 Jews were murdered at Bronna Góra forest in death pits. The victims were transported there in Holocaust trains from Nazi ghettos, including from the Brześć Ghetto and the Pińsk Ghetto, and from the ghettos in the surrounding area, as well as from Reichskommissariat Ostland (present-day Western Belarus).

== Background ==
After a century of foreign domination, the Second Polish Republic became an independent state at the end of World War I. Bronna Góra was part of the Polesie Voivodeship, and remained so until the Nazi-Soviet invasion of Poland in 1939. With a railway stop at the edge of the woods, Bronna Góra became the location of secluded massacres in 1942, with trainloads of Jews transported and dislodged there from the Brześć Ghetto, the Pińsk Ghetto, and all other ghettos created by Nazi Germany in the area.

Following the Soviet invasion of 1939, Bronna Góra along with most of Polesie Voivodeship was annexed into the Soviet Belarus after the NKVD-staged elections decided in the atmosphere of terror. All citizens previously living but also born in Poland would live in the Byelorussian Soviet Socialist Republic from then on, as the Soviet subjects, not Polish. However, the Soviet rule was short-lived because the corresponding terms of the Molotov–Ribbentrop Pact signed earlier in Moscow were broken when the German Army crossed the Soviet occupation zone on 22 June 1941. From 1941 to 1943 the province was under the control of Nazi Germany, govern by the collaborationist Byelorussian Central Council supported by the Nazi Belarusian battalions of the Byelorussian Home Defence.

== Mass killings ==
The first murder operation took place in June 1942, with 3,500 Jews transported from the Pińsk Ghetto and nearby Kobryn for "processing" (durchschleusen), (Note: The term durchgeschleust or "processed" to describe the annihilation of Jews in the occupied Eastern territories appeared in the Korherr Report, by personal request of Heinrich Himmler, who objected to the word Sonderbehandlung or "special treatment" synonymous with death in the Nazi phraseology already since 1939 (per September 20, 1939 Heydrich's telegram to Gestapo).) at Bronna Góra. According to postwar testimony of Benjamin Wulf, a Polish Jew from Antopal who managed to survive the massacre, the train stop was surrounded by a barbed-wire fence. The prisoners were informed by a translator that washing stations were in the woods behind. They were ordered to leave their outer garments by the train and take only the soap and towel. Those who did not have soap were told not to worry because it had been supplied. The path through the woods, surrounded by barbed wire, was heavily guarded. It became narrower until the sounds of shooting made it clear what went on at the end of the trail. The Jews who attempted to escape by crossing the fence were shot on the wires. Further up, the path opened to an area with execution pits 4 metres (13 ft) deep and 60 metres (200 ft) long, dug under the gun by hundreds of local laborers. Explosive materials were used to speed up the digging process. The fresh new victims were brought into the trenches and were shot one by one over the bodies of others. According to a witness interviewed by Yahad-In Unum, 52,000 people were killed in Bronna Góra, including Jews and people who were believed to be linked to partisans.

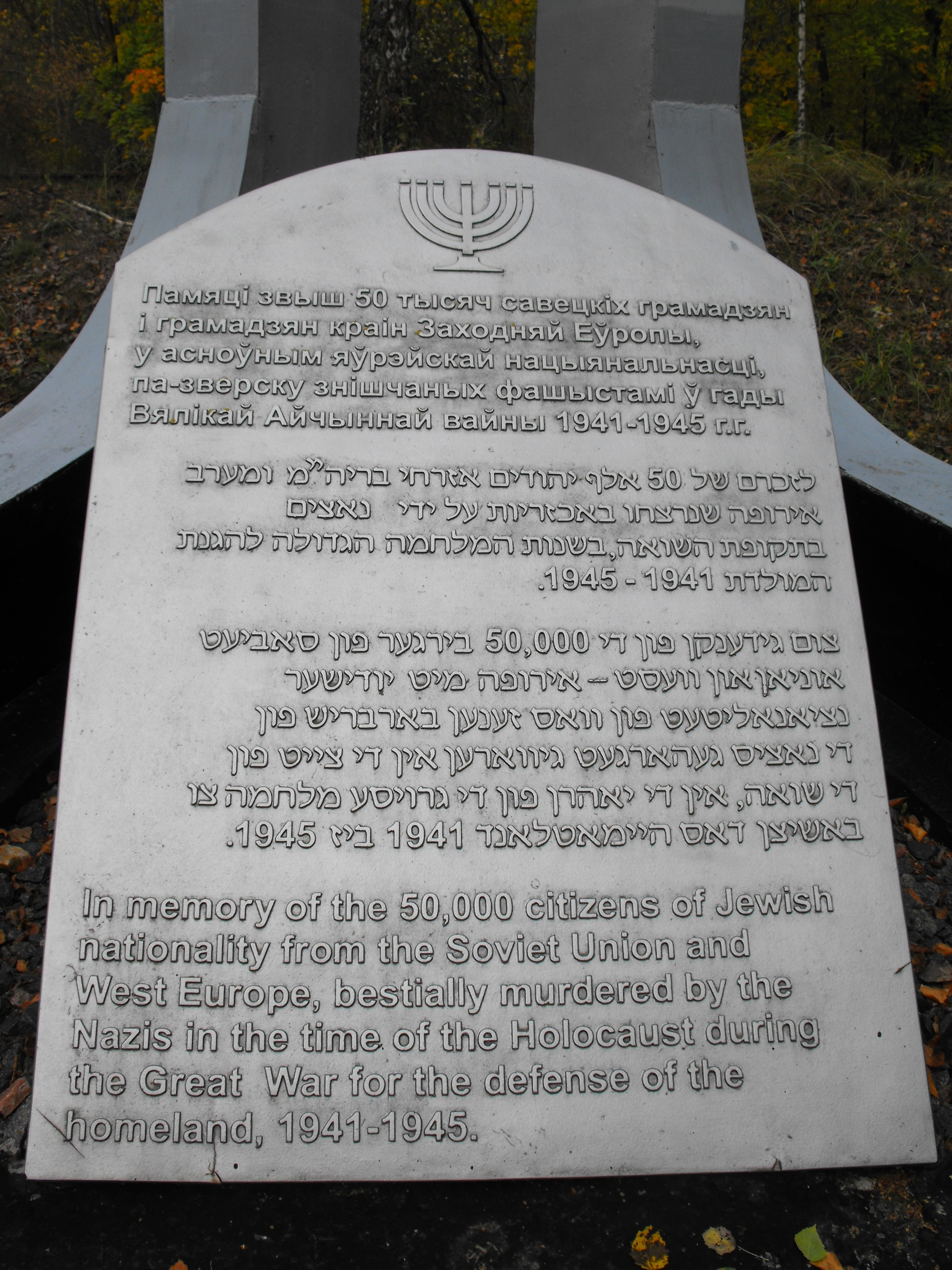
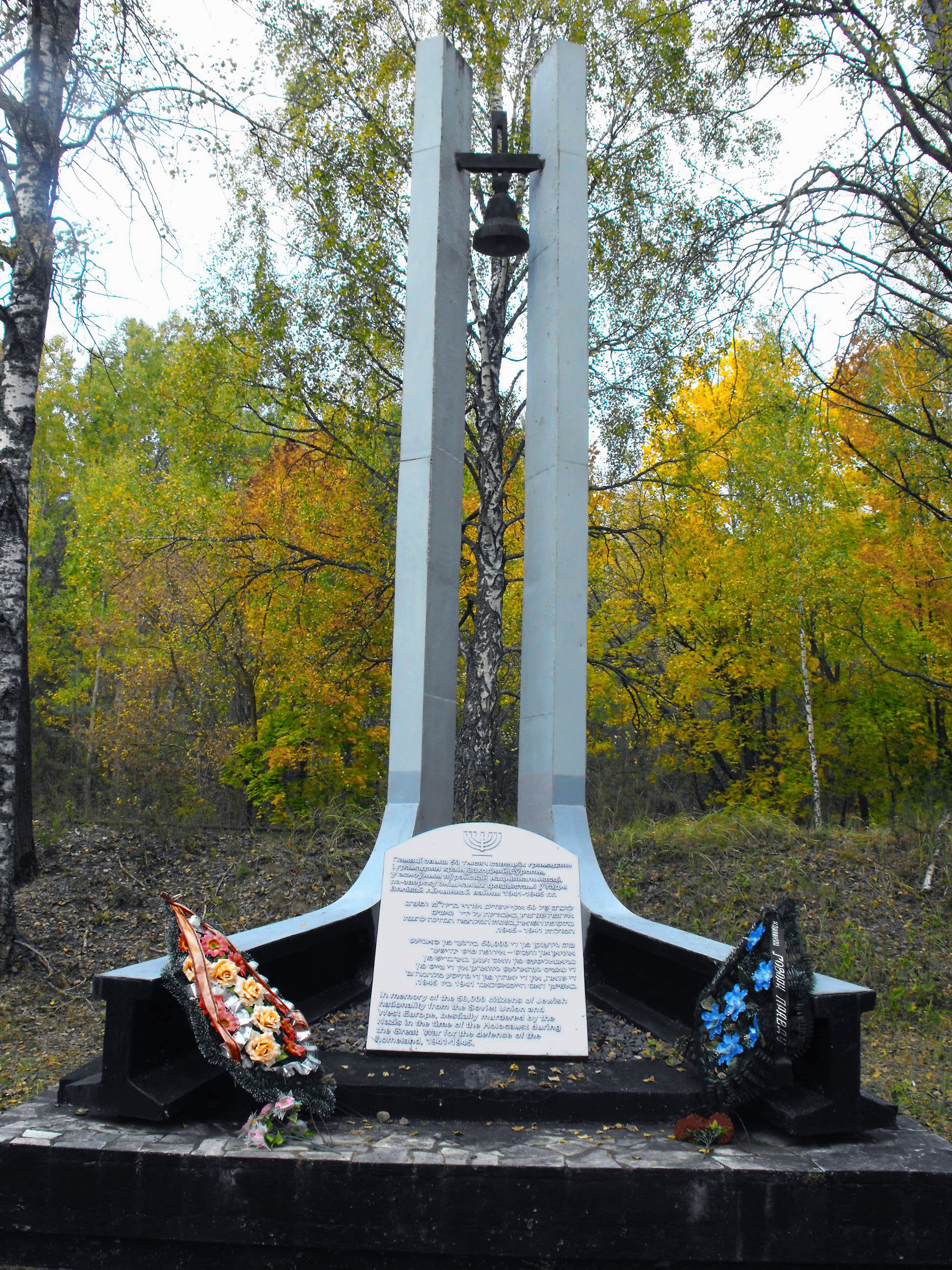
"In memory of the 50,000 citizens of Jewish nationality from the Soviet Union and West Europe", reads the inscription on the monument at Bronnaja Gora (be)

In March 1944, as the Red Army advanced, the Germans attempted to erase the evidence of the massacres. A special Sonderaktion 1005 was brought in from outside, consisting of 100 slave workers. For the next two weeks, they exhumed mass graves and burned the bodies on pyres. When they were finished, trees were planted, and all of the prisoners were shot. After the war, at the 1945 Potsdam Conference, Poland's borders were redrawn and Bronna Góra became part of the Byelorussian Soviet Socialist Republic. A memorial was erected at the site commemorating the perished Jewish citizens of the Soviet Union.
