= Choral synagogue (Vitebsk) =

Former synagogue in Vitebsk, Belarus

Choral Synagogue of Vitebsk
- Belarusian: Харальная сінагога Віцебска
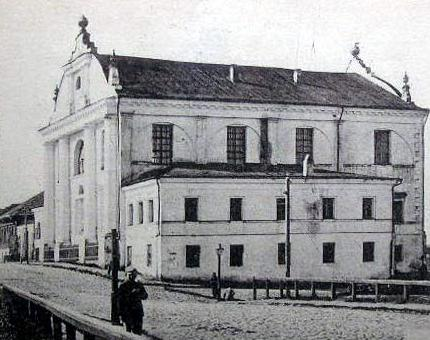
- The former synagogue, in 1904

- Location of Vitebsk, in Belarus

Religion
- Affiliation: Orthodox Judaism (former)
- Rite: Nusach Ashkenaz
- Ecclesiastical or organizational status: Synagogue (1630–1929)
- Status: Closed; subsequently destroyed

Location
- Location: Malo-Mogilevskaya Street, Vitebsk
- Country: Belarus
- Interactive map of Choral Synagogue of Vitebsk
- Coordinates: 55°N 29.5°E

Architecture
- Type: Synagogue architecture
- Style: Baroque
- Completed: 1630
- Destroyed: c. 1939

The Choral synagogue of Vitebsk (Belarusian: Харальная сінагога Віцебска, romanized: Charaĺnaja sinahoha Viciebska; Russian: Заручайная Синагога Витебска, romanized: Zarachaynaya Sinagoga Vitebska) was an Orthodox Jewish synagogue, located on Malo-Mogilevskaya Street in Vitebsk, Belarus. Known as the synagogue of Marc Chagall, its ruins have remained in the city since its destruction during World War II.

== History ==
The synagogue was built in 1630. It is most commonly known as being the synagogue of the artist Marc Chagall.

The synagogue was closed in 1929, and destroyed during World War II. Its ruins remain in the city of Vitebsk to this day, and have become a symbol of the decline of the Jewish community of Belarus. In recent years, the municipal government of Vitebsk has offered to sell the synagogue to anyone willing to rebuild it, on the condition that they restore the building as it was prior to its destruction.

== See also ==
- List of choral synagogues
