= Antopal =

Urban-type settlement in Brest Region, Belarus

Antopal Антопаль (Belarusian)
- Urban-type settlement
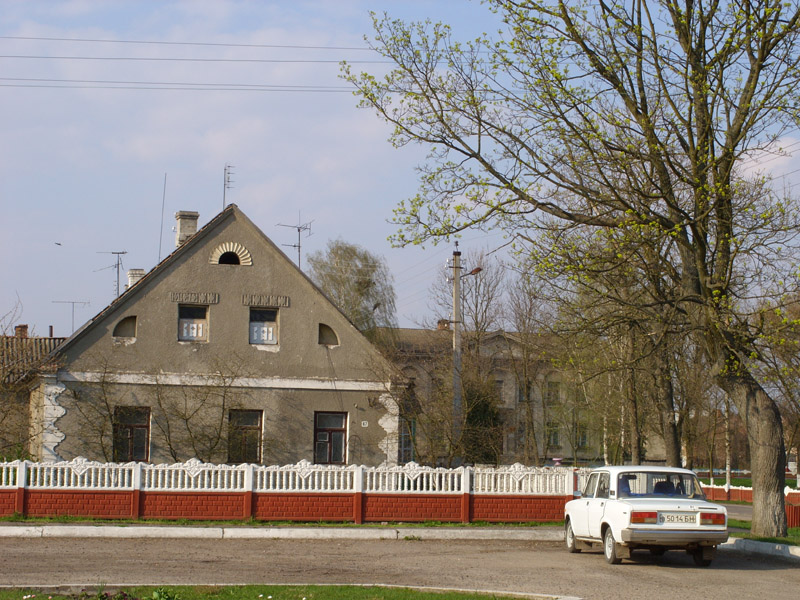
- Old bank in Antopal, 2009

- Location in Belarus
- Coordinates: 52°12′N 24°47′E
- Country: Belarus
- Region: Brest Region
- District: Drahichyn District

Population (2026)
  - Total: 1,369
- Time zone: UTC+3 (MSK)

Antopal, or Antopol, (Note: Belarusian: Анто́паль, local pronunciation: [ɐnˈtɔpolʲ], [ɐntoˈpʲilʲːɛ]; Russian: Анто́поль; Yiddish: אַנטעפּאָליע, romanized: Antepolye;; Polish: Antopol Hebrew: אנטופול.) is an urban-type settlement in Drahichyn District, Brest Region, Belarus. It is located near the towns of Kobryn and Brest. As of 2026, it has a population of 1,369.

Antopol is situated in the Polesian Lowland near the river Pripyat which flows into the Dnieper River. The Polesian Plain is a region of lakes and moors, well suited for agriculture. It changed hands frequently between Poland and Russia. Between the two world wars, western Polesia was part of the Kresy region of Poland.

== History ==
Within the Grand Duchy of Lithuania, Antopal was part of Brest Litovsk Voivodeship. In 1731, Antopal was given the status of a town. As a result of the Third Partition of Poland, in 1795, the town was incorporated into the Russian Empire, which administered it as part of the Kobrinsky Uyezd of Grodno Governorate. During World War I, Antopal was occupied by the German Empire from 1915 to 1918. Between 1918 and 1921, the town changed hands several times, until on 18 March 1921, as a result of the Treaty of Riga, it was incorporated into the Second Polish Republic, which administered it as part of Polesie Voivodeship. As a result of the Soviet invasion of Poland, which started on 17 September 1939, Western Belorussia, including Antopal, was incorporated into the Soviet Union on 14 November 1939 as part of the Byelorussian SSR. As a result of Operation Barbarossa, Antopal was under German occupation from 25 June 1941 until 15 July 1944. During this time, like most of southwestern Belorussia, it was administered as part of the Reichskommissariat Ukraine.

=== Jewish history ===
According to Encyclopaedia Judaica, Jews were already living in Polesia in the 14th century. They settled in Antopal in the middle of the 17th century. The town has an old Jewish cemetery and a bathhouse. During the Swedish occupation (1701–06) many Antopal Jews were killed. On the road to the town there are rows of Jewish graves, called "The Swedes." Two emissaries from Jerusalem visited Antopal in the 1880s and mentioned the Jewish community in their records. In 1847, there were 1,108 Jews in Antopal, and in 1897 about 3,140, out of a total population of 3,870.

From time to time, fires broke out in the town. In 1869, nearly the entire town burned down but was then rebuilt. Before World War II, the town had five Jewish study halls (batei midrash) and also a Hassidic prayer hall (shtibl). The old synagogue burned down during World War I, and a new synagogue was built in its place.

The presiding judges of Antopal and the nearby town of Horodoff were Rabbi Haim S. Zalman Bressler, Rabbi Pinkas Michalek and Rabbi Mordechaie Wizel Rosenblatt. Rabbi Moshe Neeman Akiva of Antopal went to Israel and survived the Safed riots of 1834.

Like many other Polesian Jews, those living in Antopal made a living from agriculture. They were landowners and leaseholders, growing corn and potatoes, and also had vegetable gardens. Peasants living in the vicinity worked for Jewish farmers. Agricultural cooperatives were founded in Antopal. Before World War I, there were 21 Jewish farms in Antopal. After the war, the economic situation of the Jewish farmers worsened and they received assistance from the J.C.A.

Several famous Americans are descended from Antopal residents; for example, Metropolitan Opera singer Roberta Peters and fiction writer Molly Antopol, author of The UnAmericans (Jewish Colonisation Association). Stephen Miller, who is currently serving in the second presidency of Donald Trump as homeland security advisor and served as a senior policy advisor in his first term, also descends from an Antopal family.

==== 20th century ====
Jews were active in fattening geese, and imported sickles and scythes from Vienna. Many Jews were carters and hawkers. After Poland's return to independence between the two world wars, Antopol was assigned to Polesie Voivodeship in the Second Polish Republic, remaining a part of it until it was annexed by the Soviet Union and made part of the Byelorussian SSR following the invasion of Poland in 1939. Bus service was introduced in 1925; connecting Antopol with Kobryn, thereby advancing further development of commerce in the town. In 1921, the town had 1,792 Jews, over 80% of the population of 2,206. In 1935, a new power station was built. A pharmacy opened. There was a dental clinic and two physicians, one of whom was a family doctor. At that time, many of the community's young people emigrated.

Soon after the invasion of Poland at the outbreak of World War II in September 1939, an influx of Jews from the German-occupied western part of Poland led to a rapid swelling of the number of Jews living in Antopol, their population growing to 2,300 out of a total population of 3,000. The area was controlled by the Soviet Union for two years. The Soviet administration requisitioned houses, mainly Jewish. Names of streets were changed: Zamkowa became Revolutionary Street and so on. All businesses were nationalized by the Soviet regime. The Germans captured the town during the 1941 Operation Barbarossa. Antopal was under German occupation from 25 June 1941 to 16 July 1944. The Jews were deported to a ghetto from which they were taken to a killing site at Bronna Góra. The ghetto liquidation 'Aktion' that started on October 15, 1942, lasted for four days, until all Jews living in the Antopol Ghetto were killed.
