= Sonderaktion 1005 =

1942–44 Nazi project to destroy evidence of war crimes in Poland

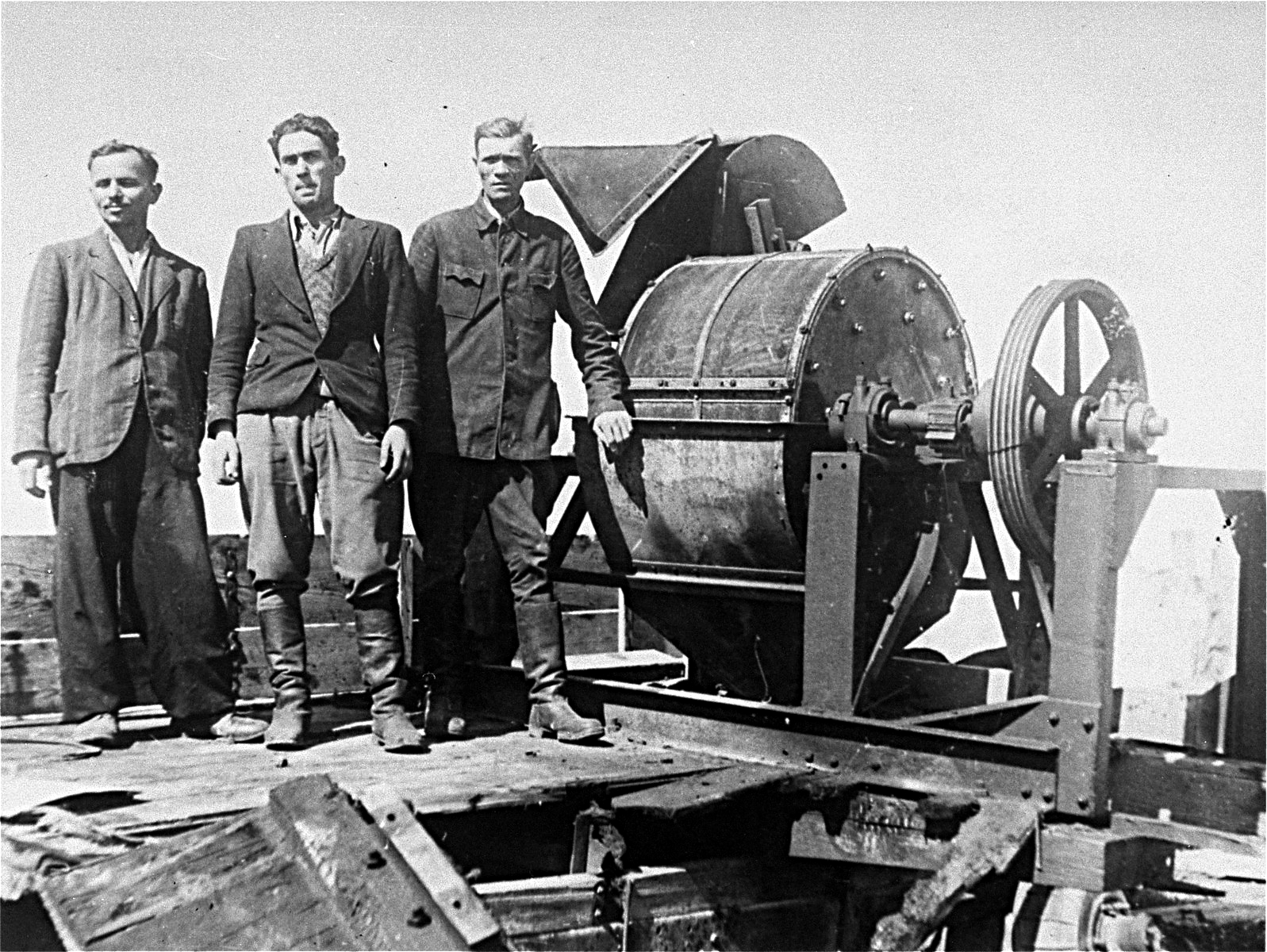
- Survivors of a Sonderkommando 1005 unit stand next to a mill used to crush bones at the Janowska concentration camp following its liberation in 1944.
- Also known as: Aktion 1005 or Enterdungsaktion
- Location: German-occupied Europe
- Participants: Germany
- Organizations: Order Police battalions Sicherheitsdienst; Trawnikis
- Camp: Extermination camps Concentration camps Mass-killing sites in Central and Eastern Europe
- Documentation: Nuremberg trials

Sonderaktion 1005 (German pronunciation: [zɔndɐakt͡sjoːn aɪ̯ntaʊ̯zəntfʏnf], 'Special Action 1005'), also called Aktion 1005 or Enterdungsaktion (German pronunciation: [ɛntɐdʊŋsakt͡sjoːn], 'Exhumation Action'), was a top-secret Nazi operation conducted from June 1942 to late 1944. The goal of the project was to hide or destroy any evidence of the mass murder that had taken place under Operation Reinhard, the attempted (and largely successful) extermination of all Jews in the General Government occupied zone of Poland. Groups of Sonderkommando prisoners, officially called Leichenkommandos ("corpse units"), were forced to exhume mass graves and burn the bodies; inmates were often put in chains to prevent them from escaping.

The project was put in place to destroy evidence of the genocide that had been committed by the Order Police battalions and Einsatzgruppen, the German death squads who murdered millions, including more than one million Jews, Roma and Slavs. The Aktion was overseen by selected squads of the Sicherheitsdienst (SD) and the uniformed Order Police.

== Operations ==
In March 1942, Reinhard Heydrich, head of the Reich Security Main Office, placed high-ranking SS functionary Paul Blobel in charge of the Aktion 1005, but its start was delayed after Heydrich died in early June 1942 from wounds sustained in an assassination attempt. It was after the end of June that Heinrich Müller, head of the Gestapo, finally gave Blobel his orders. While the principal aim was to erase evidence of Jewish exterminations, the Aktion would also include non-Jewish victims of Nazi persecution.

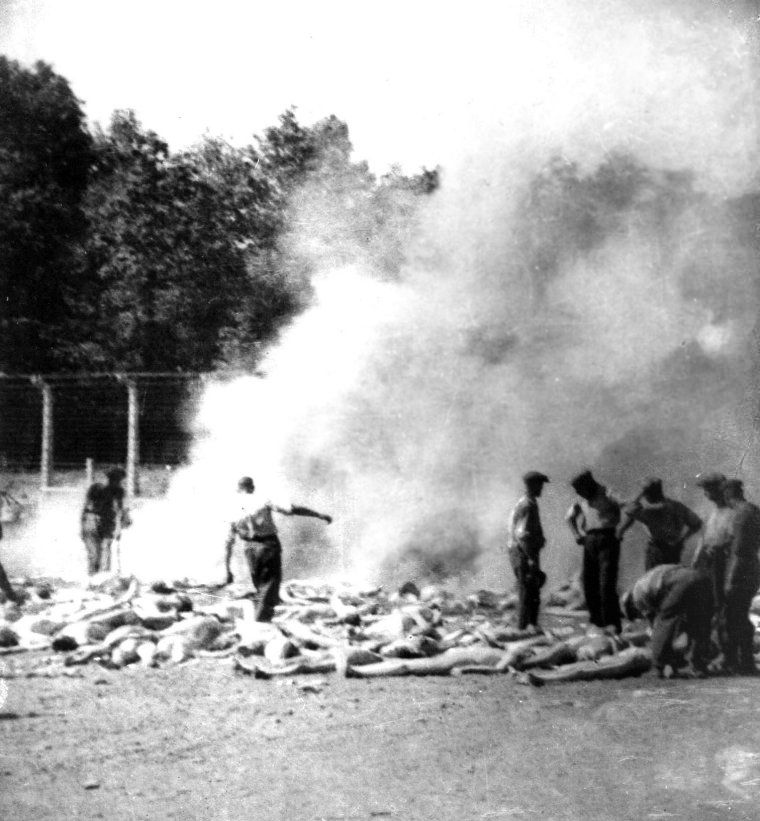
Burning of bodies at Auschwitz-Birkenau by Sonderkommando prisoners in 1944 (secret photo by prisoner Alberto Errera)

Blobel began his work experimenting at the Chełmno extermination camp (Kulmhof). Attempts to use incendiary bombs to destroy exhumed bodies were unsuccessful, as the weapons set fire to nearby forests. The most effective way was eventually found to be giant pyres on iron grills. The method involved building alternating layers of corpses and firewood on railway tracks. After the pyre burned down, remaining bone fragments could be crushed by pounding with heavy dowels or in a grinding machine and then re-buried in pits. The operation officially began at Sobibor extermination camp. The Leichenkommando exhumed the bodies from mass graves around the camp and then burned them; their work done, they themselves were then executed. The process then moved to Bełżec in November 1942. The Auschwitz and Majdanek camps had crematoria with furnace rooms on site to dispose of the bodies and so the Aktion 1005 commandos were not needed there. "Surplus" corpses were burned by their own prisoners (pictured).

The semi-industrial incineration of corpses at the Treblinka extermination camp began as soon as the political danger associated with the earlier burials was realised. In 1943, the 22,000 Polish victims of the Soviet Katyn massacre were discovered near Smolensk and reported to Adolf Hitler. Their remains were well preserved underground, attesting to the Soviet mass murder. By April 1943, Nazi propaganda began to draw attention of the international community to that war crime. The Katyn Commission was formed to make detailed examinations in an effort to drive a wedge between the Allies. Meanwhile, the secret orders to exhume mass graves and instead to burn the hundreds of thousands of victims came directly from the Nazi leadership in April. The corpses that had been buried at Treblinka with the use of a crawler excavator were dug up and cremated on the orders of Heinrich Himmler himself, who visited the camp in March 1943. The instructions to utilise rails as grates came from Herbert Floss, the camp's cremation expert. The bodies were placed on cremation pyres that were up to 30 metres (98 ft) long, with rails laid across the pits on concrete blocks. They were splashed with petrol over wood and burned in one massive blaze attended by roughly 300 prisoners, who operated the pyres. In Bełżec, the round-the-clock operation lasted until March 1943. In Treblinka, it went on at full speed until the end of July.

The operation also returned to the scenes of earlier mass killings such as Babi Yar, Ponary, the Ninth Fort, and Bronna Góra. By 1944, with Soviet armies advancing, Wilhelm Koppe, head of the Reichsgau Wartheland, ordered that each of the five districts of General Government territory set up its own Aktion 1005 commando to begin "cleaning" mass graves. The operations were not entirely successful, as the advancing Soviet troops reached some of the sites before they could be cleared.

== Aftermath ==
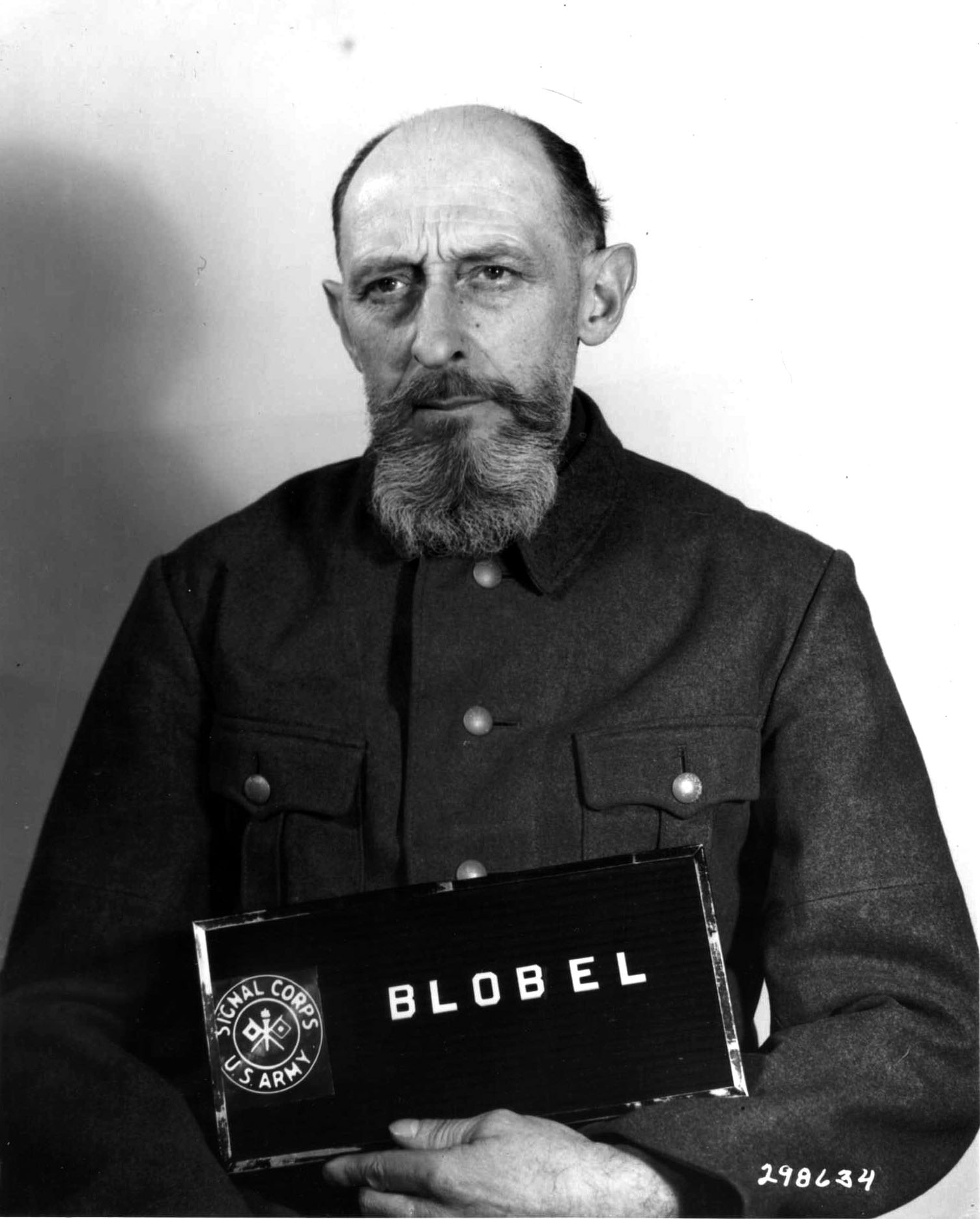
Paul Blobel, beard grown in prison

At the Nuremberg Trials after World War II, a deputy of Adolf Eichmann, Dieter Wisliceny, gave the following testimony on Aktion 1005:

In November 1942, in Eichmann's office in Berlin, I met Standartenfuehrer Plobel [sic], who was leader of Kommando 1005, which was specially assigned to remove all traces of the final solution of the Jewish problem by Einsatz Groups and all other executions. Kommando 1005 operated from at least autumn 1942 to September 1944 and was all this period subordinated to Eichmann. The mission was constituted after it first became apparent that Germany would not be able to hold all the territory occupied in the East and it was considered necessary to remove all traces of the criminal executions that had been committed. While in Berlin in November 1942, Plobel [sic] gave a lecture before Eichmann's staff of specialists on the Jewish question from the occupied territories. He spoke of the special incinerators he had personally constructed for use in the work of Kommando 1005. It was their particular assignment to open the graves and remove and cremate the bodies of persons who had been previously executed. Kommando 1005 operated in Russia, Poland and through the Baltic area. I again saw Plobel [sic] in Hungary in 1944 and he stated to Eichmann in my presence that the mission of Kommando 1005 had been completed. — SS-Hauptsturmführer Dieter Wisliceny

Blobel was sentenced to death by the US Nuremberg Military Tribunal in the Einsatzgruppen Trial. He was hanged at Landsberg Prison on June 7, 1951. Nearly 60,000 deaths are attributable to Blobel, but during his testimony at Nuremberg, he claimed that he killed only 10,000 to 15,000 people.

The prosecution at the trial of Eichmann in 1961 attempted to prove that Eichmann was Blobel's superior, but the court did not accept it. Blobel's superior was actually Heinrich Müller.

== Sources ==
- Arad, Yitzhak, Belzec, Sobibor, Treblinka, Indiana University Press, 1992. ISBN 0-253-21305-3.
- Baranovskiy, Mikhail, Tango of Death. A True Story of Holocaust Survivors. Mr. Mintz Publishing, 2020. ISBN 9798620147014.
- Edelheit, Abraham J., and Edelheit, Herschel, History of the Holocaust, Westview Press, 1995. ISBN 0-8133-2240-5.
- Angrick, Andrej, Aktion 1005« - Spurenbeseitigung von NS-Massenverbrechen 1942 -1945, Göttingen, Wallstein Verlag, 2018. ISBN 9783835332683
- Spector, Shmuel. "Aktion 1005—effacing the murder of millions"(archive) Oxford Journals, Holocaust and Genocide Studies. Volume 5, Issue 2. pp. 157–173. doi:10.1093/hgs/5.2.157.
