= Brześć Ghetto =

Nazi ghetto in occupied Belarus

Coordinates: 52°6′N 23°42′E

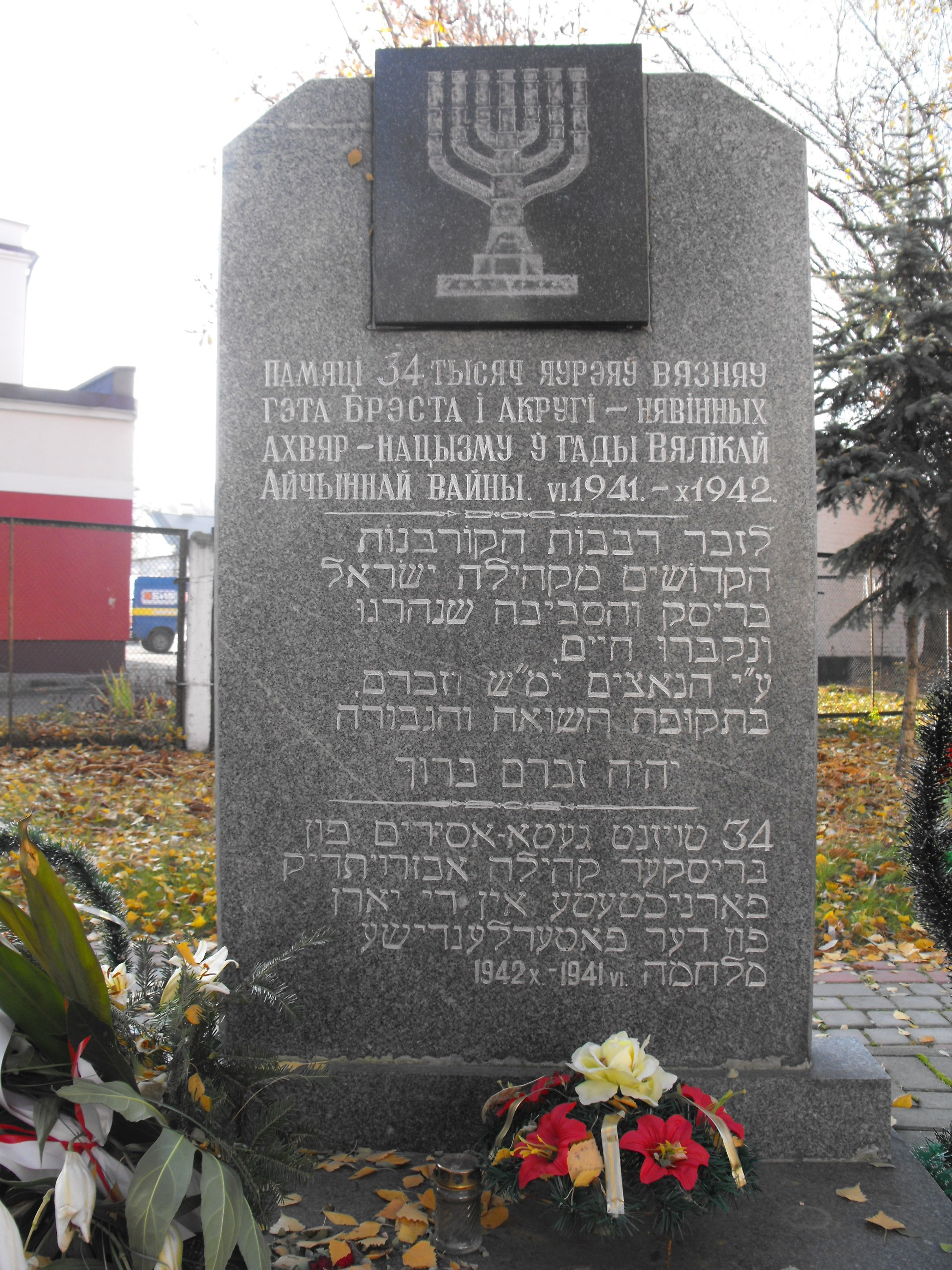
- Ghetto memorial

- Brześć location north of Sobibor in World War II
- Location: Brześć, German-occupied Poland
- Date: December 16, 1941 to October 15, 1942
- Incident type: Imprisonment, starvation, mass shootings
- Organizations: Nazi SS
- Victims: 18,000 Polish Jews

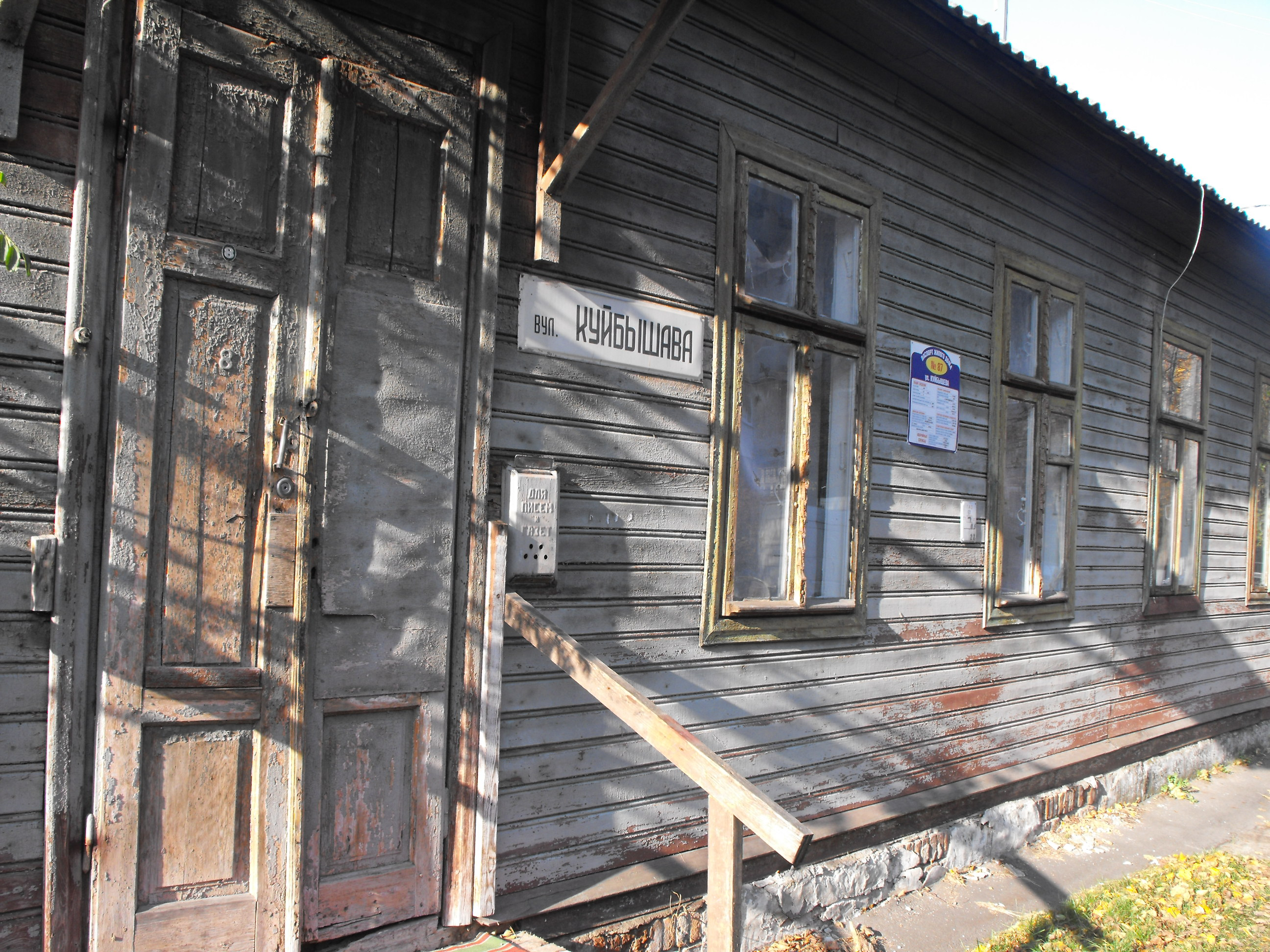
Preserved house with a commemorative plaque at the former ul. Długa street of Brześć ghetto

The Brześć Ghetto or the Brest Ghetto, also: Brześć nad Bugiem Ghetto, Brest-Litovsk Ghetto (Polish: getto w Brześciu nad Bugiem, Yiddish: בריסק or בריסק-ד׳ליטע) was a Nazi ghetto created in German-occupied Eastern Poland / Western Belarus in December 1941, six months after the German troops had invaded the Soviet Union in June 1941. Less than a year after the creation of the ghetto, around October 15–18, 1942, most of approximately 20,000 Jewish inhabitants of Brest (Brześć) were murdered; over 5,000 were executed locally at the Brest Fortress on the orders of Karl Eberhard Schöngarth; the rest in the secluded forest of the Bronna Góra extermination site (the Bronna Mount, Belarusian: Бронная гара), sent there aboard Holocaust trains under the guise of 'resettlement'.

== Background ==
Before World War II, Brześć nad Bugiem (now Brest, Belarus) was the capital of Polesie Voivodeship in the Second Polish Republic (1918–39) with the most visible Jewish presence. In the twenty years of Poland's sovereignty, of the total of 36 brand new schools established in the city, there were ten public, and five private Jewish schools inaugurated, with Yiddish and Hebrew as the language of instruction. In 1936 Jews constituted 41.3% of the Brześć population, or 21,518 citizens. Some 80.3% of private enterprises were owned by Jews.

Brest-Litovsk was renamed as Brześć nad Bugiem (Brest on the Bug) in the Second Polish Republic on March 20, 1923. Just before the outbreak of World War II, there was an anti-Jewish riot at the bazaar in Brześć on May 15, 1939. Some Jewish sources categorize it as Polish although ethnic Belarusians constituted 17.8% of the population.

== Ghetto history ==
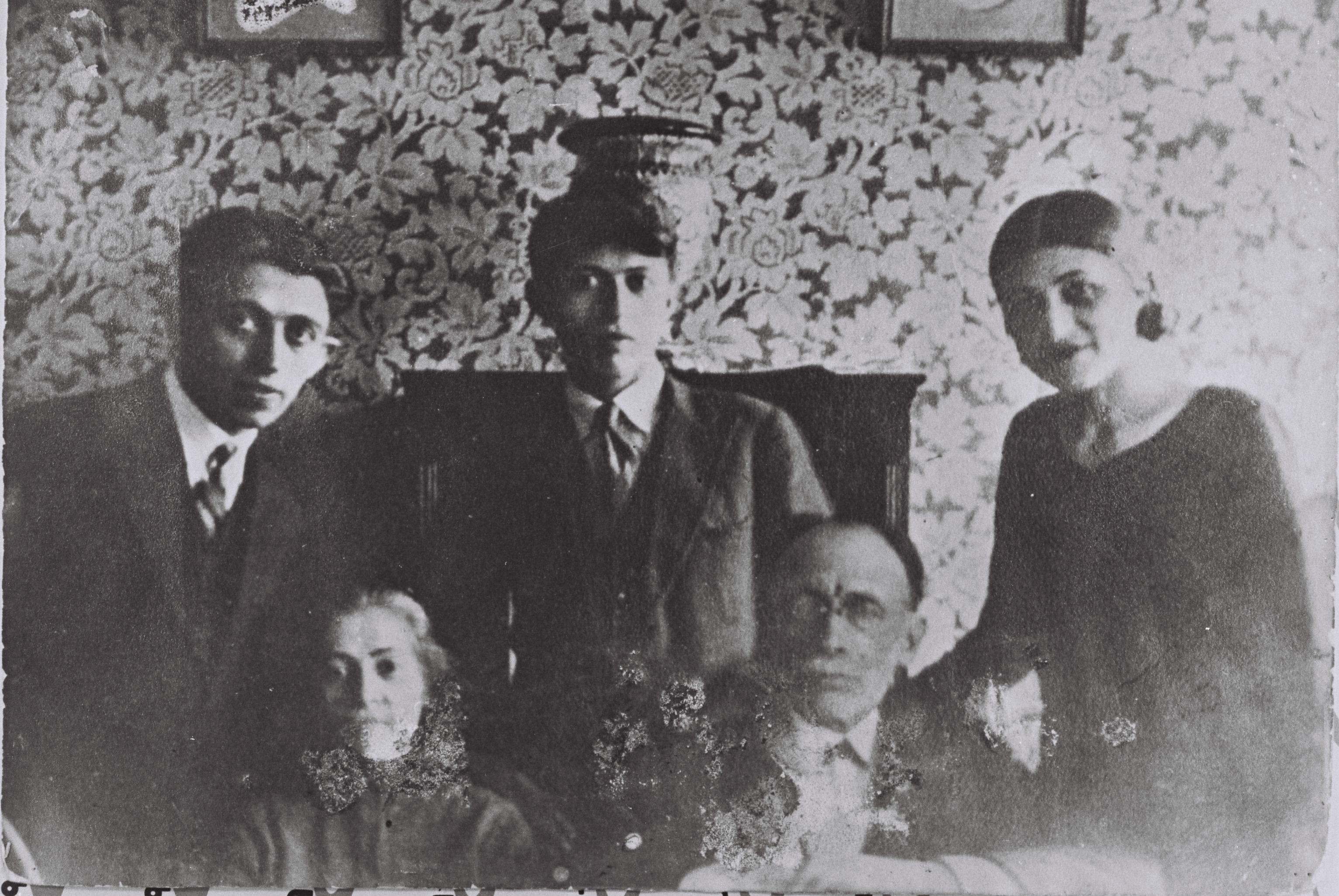
The Begin family of Brest-Litovsk, 1932. Menachem Begin is seen at the top center of the photograph. His older brother Herzl and his father were murdered during the Holocaust.

In September 1939 during the German and Soviet invasion of Poland, the town of Brześć (Brest) was overrun by the German troops and handed over to the Russians during the German–Soviet military parade in Brest-Litovsk on September 22, 1939. The whole province was soon annexed by the Soviet Union following mock elections by the NKVD secret police, conducted among the locals in the atmosphere of fear and terror. The mass deportations of Poles and Jews to Siberia followed.

The German armed forces launched Operation Barbarossa against the Soviet Union on June 22, 1941, and Brześć was captured the same day. On 24 June 1941, a 15-man Sicherheitspolizei detachment, commanded by SS-Untersturmführer Schmidt, arrived in Brześć. On December 16, 1941, the Germans placed Brest under the administration of the Reichskommissariat Ukraine and established a Nazi ghetto in the city for some 18,000 Polish Jews, who still resided there after months of deportations and ad hoc mass executions. On July 10–12, 1941 the German Einsatzgruppe under SS-Obergruppenführer Karl Eberhard Schöngarth massacred 5,000 Jews including 13-year-old boys and 70-year-old men in a single night. The Order Police battalions passing through Brześć and Białystok carried out significantly larger shooting actions. "The first massacre of Brest Jews – wrote Christopher Browning – was perpetrated not by the notorious Einsatzgruppen but rather by Police Battalion 307 with Wehrmacht support, in mid-July, on the orders of Himmler's chief of Order Police, Kurt Daluege.".

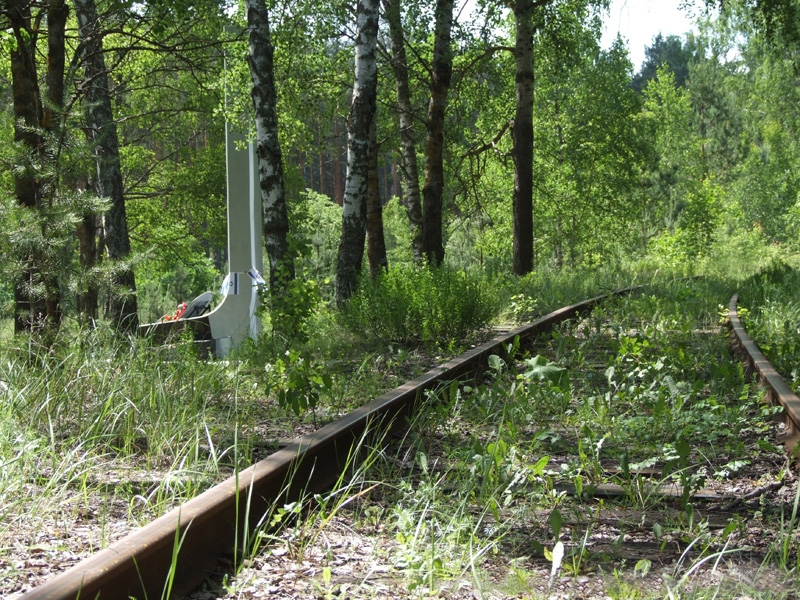
Old railway line near Bronna Góra (the Bronna Mount, now in Belarus), with marked location of mass killings of Jews from the Brześć Ghetto among other ghettos in the vicinity

In August 1941 the Germans extracted a payment of some 26 million rubles worth of cash and valuables from the Jews of Brześć.

On 15 October 1942, Jews were rounded up for "relocation", and murdered over execution pits north-east of the city at the Bronna Mount (Bronna Góra) forest. A few hundred Jews: infirm, Jewish police, hospital personnel, children at the children's home, and elderly at the home for the retired were killed in the ghetto itself. In the course of 2 days, some 16,000 were killed. Resistance organizations formed by Jews in the camp, "Liberation" and "Revenge", planned on attacking the Germans during the liquidation to create a diversion allowing Jews to escape. These plans were foiled by the Germans who were informed of these plans.

Some Jews managed to avoid the liquidation by going into hiding. The local police, consisting of Poles as well as Belarusians and Ukrainians, conducted regular searches for hiding Jews. Captured Jews were either shot by the police, or sent to prison. Some 300 to 400 Jews captured and held in the prison were subsequently transported by train to Baranowicze.

Members of the communist underground acquired identification cards, at the end of 1941, for several individuals preventing their expulsion. Several families were hidden by the family of the head of the local communist underground P. Zhulikov (who perished himself in 1943). Following the recapture of the city by the Red Army in July 1944, only some 20 Jews are known to have survived in Brześć. Recognized rescuers from the Brześć area include P. Grigoriewicz, Maria i Ignacy Kurianowiczowie, W. Niesterenko, A. Łabasiuk, A. Stelmaszuk. P. Makaren (for saving a young boy named M. Engelman and sisters Maria and Szulamit Kacaf) and Sofia and Piotr Gołowczenko (for saving Izrael, Nechemii and Lii Mankierów). A Polish priest, Father Jan Urbanowicz, Dean of the Holy Cross Parish in Brześć, was also executed by the Germans in June 1943 for aiding Jews.

== Post war ==
In February 2019, a mass grave — 40 meters in length and 2 meters deep — was discovered at a construction site located in the former ghetto. By March 2019, over 1,214 human bodies had been recovered from the mass grave, along with shoes, clothes, and other personal items. The Jewish community of Brest, and the Simon Wiesenthal Center requested that the site become an official Holocaust memorial.

== See also ==
- Choral Synagogue (Brest)
