= Choral Synagogue (Brest) =

Former synagogue in Brest, Belarus

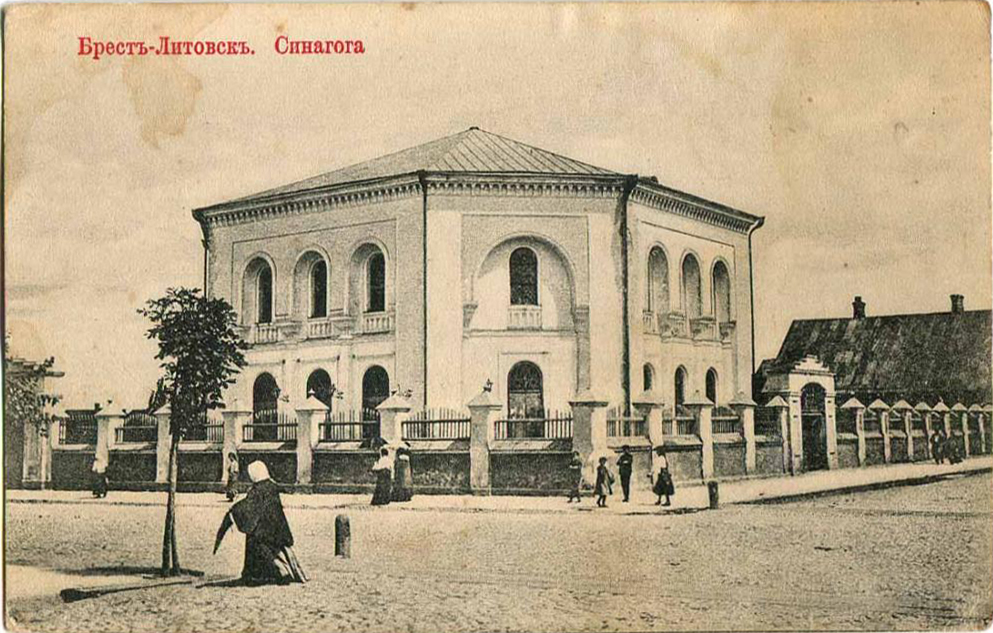
- An early 20th-century image of the synagogue

- Location in Belarus

Religion
- Affiliation: Orthodox Judaism (former)
- Ecclesiastical or organisational status: Synagogue (1862–1941)
- Ownership: cinema Belarus
- Status: non active

Location
- Location: Brest
- Country: Belarus
- Coordinates: 52°05′27″N 23°41′41″E

Architecture
- Type: Synagogue architecture
- Style: Octagonal
- Groundbreaking: 1851
- Completed: 1862
- Inscriptions: memorial plaque about the Great Synagogue of Brest

The Choral Synagogue or the Great Synagogue is a former Orthodox Jewish synagogue in Brest (known in Yiddish: Brisk), Belarus. Completed in c. 1862, it was used as a synagogue until World War II, and served as the main synagogue in Brest.

== History ==
An old synagogue had stood in Brest for nearly 3 centuries, having been built in 1588. However, in 1847, its building was destroyed because the Brest Fortress was built, and funds were collected to erect another building in the new city. This building took years to complete due to a lack of funding; despite the construction's commencement being in 1851, the structure was only completed in 1861/1862. In 1859, a fire ravaged the synagogue but it was restored. In 1941, with the creation of the Brest Ghetto during World War II, the synagogue sat on the ghetto border, next to its entrance, and was used by the Nazis as a warehouse. Although the building was damaged in 1942 during the ghetto's liquidation, it remained standing until 1959. At that time, it was confiscated by the communist government and transformed into a theatre, known today as Cinema Belarus. A plaque outside memorializes the synagogue. In addition, Hebrew inscriptions are still visible in the basement.

== Rabbis ==
Brest was home to a flourishing Orthodox Jewish community. At the time of the original synagogue's destruction, the city's rabbi was Rabbi Yaakov Meir Padua. In fact, he personally drew up the blueprints for the new synagogue. However, he died in 1855 before the building's completion. He was succeeded by Rabbi Tzvi Hirsch Orenstein, an influential rabbi who opened a communal hospital and an old age home. However he was exiled by the authorities in1874 and succeeded by Rabbi Yehoshua Leib Diskin. Immensely popular, his yeshiva attracted prodigious Torah scholars. Rabbi Diskin was also a fierce opponent of the secular Haskalah (Jewish enlightenment) movement, and when a club of Haskalists (Hebrew: maskilim) arose in Brest under the tutelage of a man named Alexandrov, he worked to disband it. In revenge, Alexandrov libeled him to the police on false claims of theft, leading to him being arrested. While he soon managed to get out of prison, he emigrated to the British Mandate. His post in Brest was filled by his student, Rabbi Yosef Dov Soloveitchik (the Beis HaLevi). The rabbinate would remain in his family for the next two generations, passing on to his son, Rabbi Chaim Soloveitchik, and then to his grandson Rabbi Yitzchak Zev Soloveitchik, who led the community until World War II. The latter was the founder of the famed Brisk Yeshiva in Jerusalem.

== Gallery ==
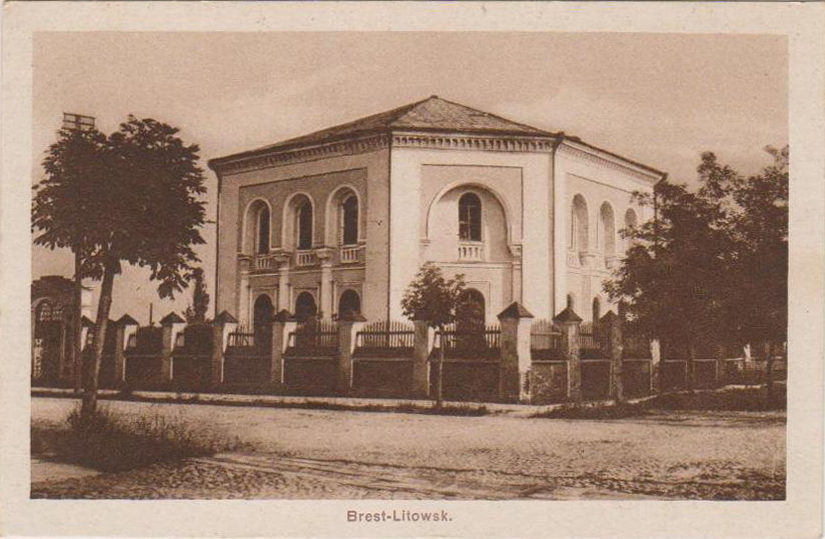
1915-1918

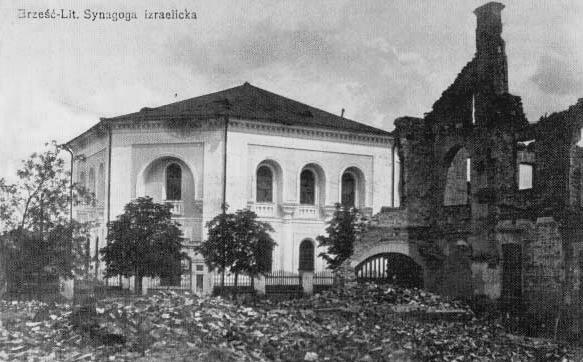
Early 20th century

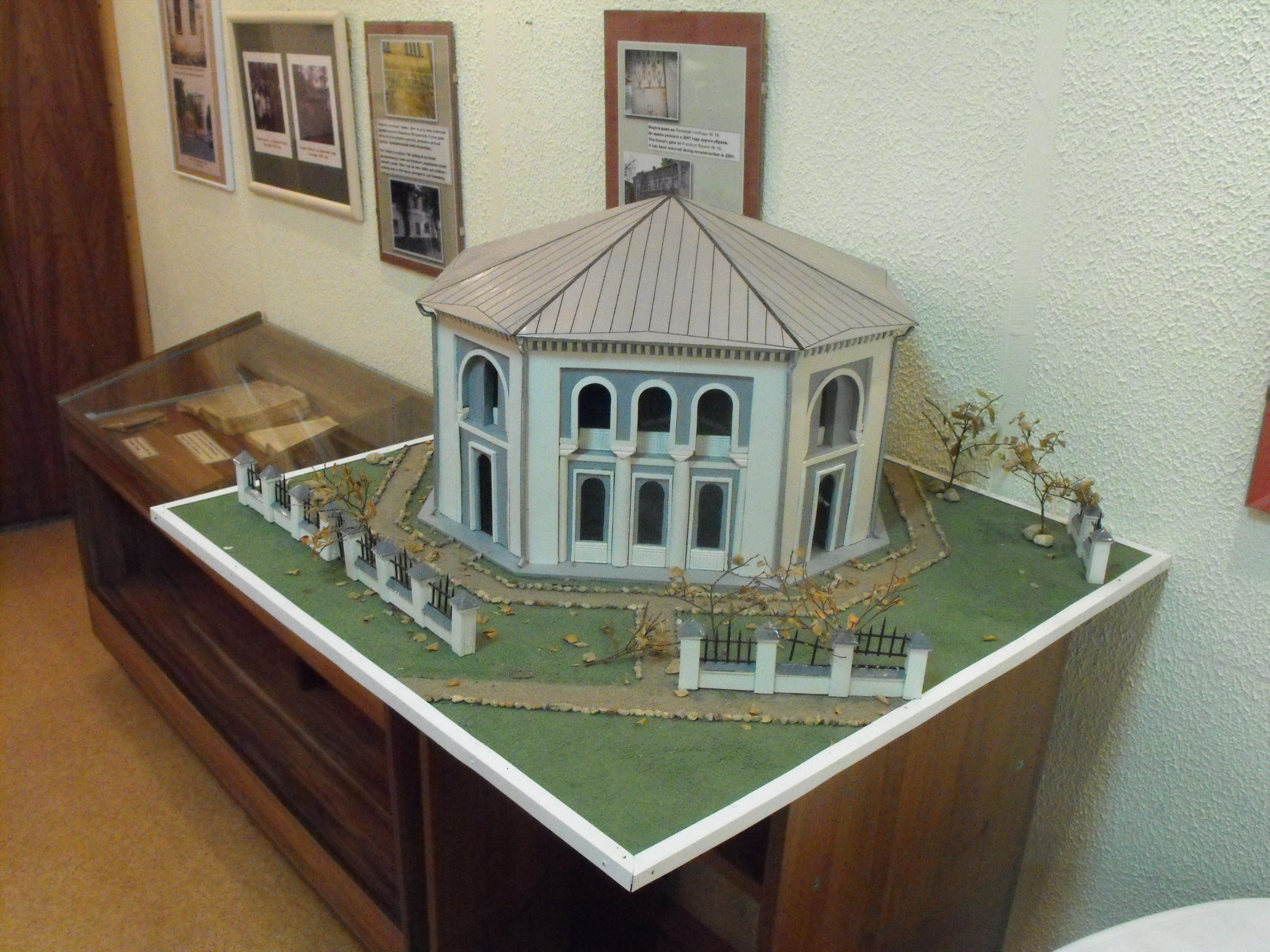
Model in the Brest Jewish Museum

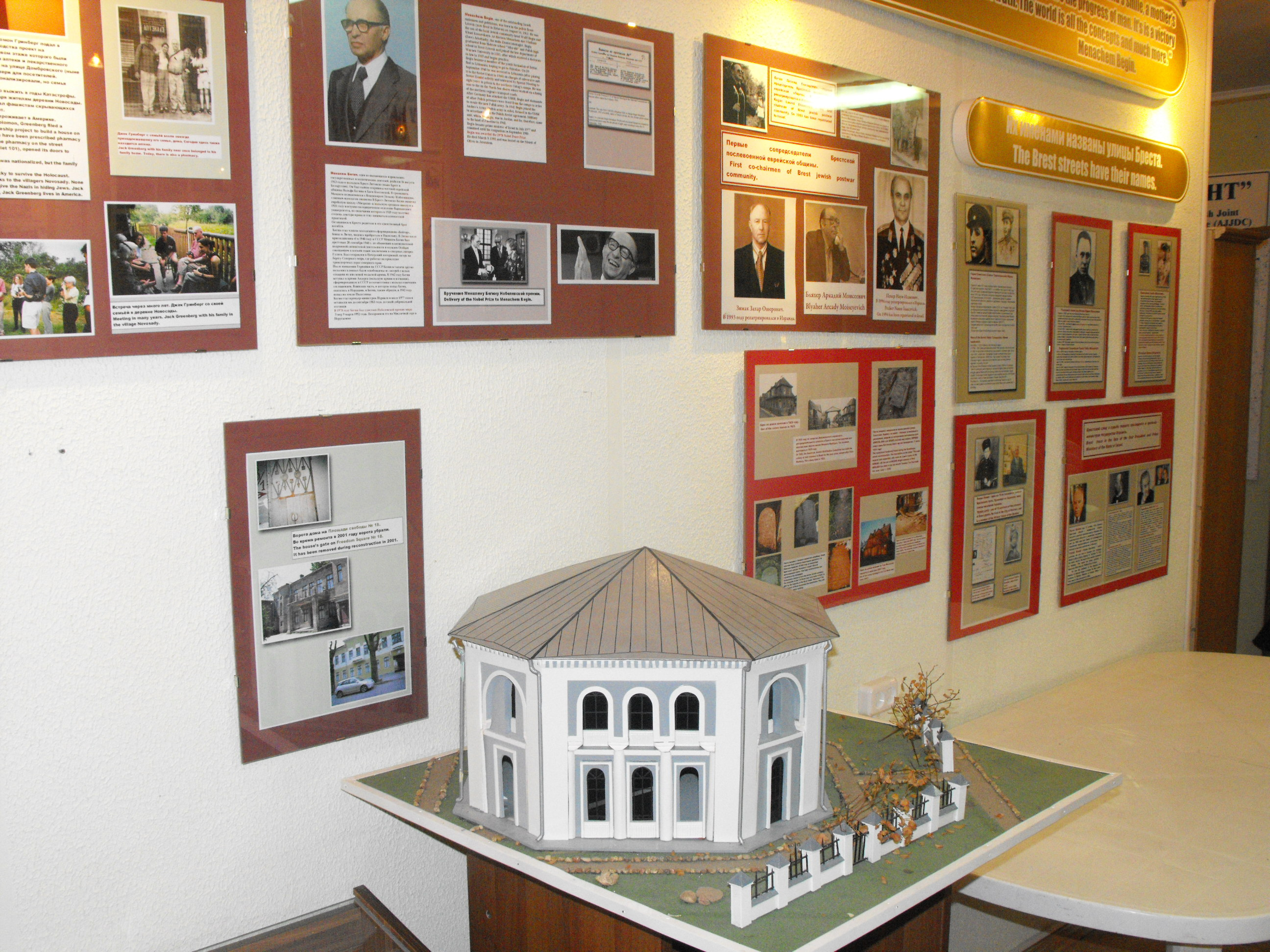
Model in the Brest Jewish Museum

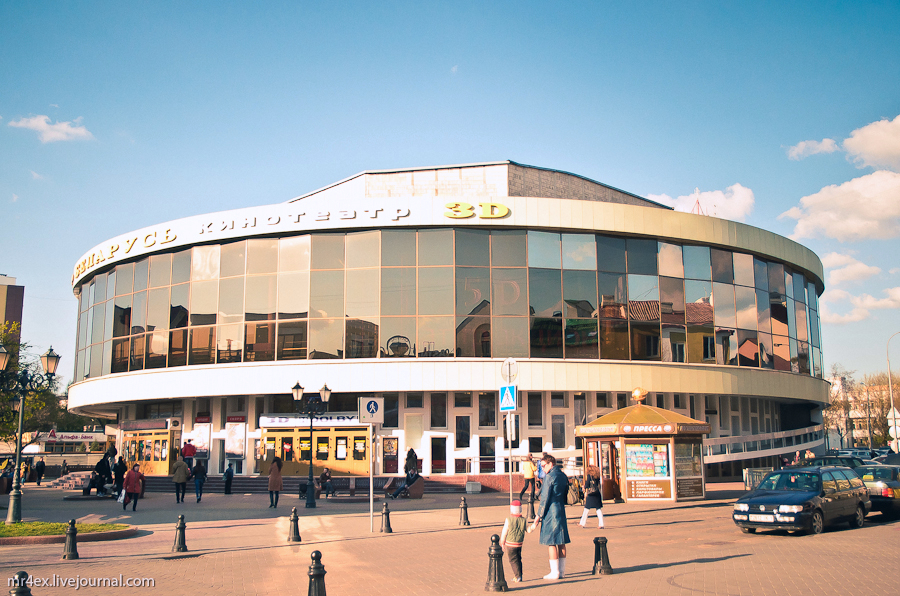
Cinema Belarus

Portraits of the students of the yeshiva in Brest

== See also ==
- Brisk tradition and Soloveitchik dynasty
- Great Synagogue (Grodno)
- The Holocaust in the Brest District
