= Great Synagogue (Grodno) =

Synagogue in Grodno, Belarus

Great Synagogue of Grodno
- Belarusian: Харальная сінагога, Горадня
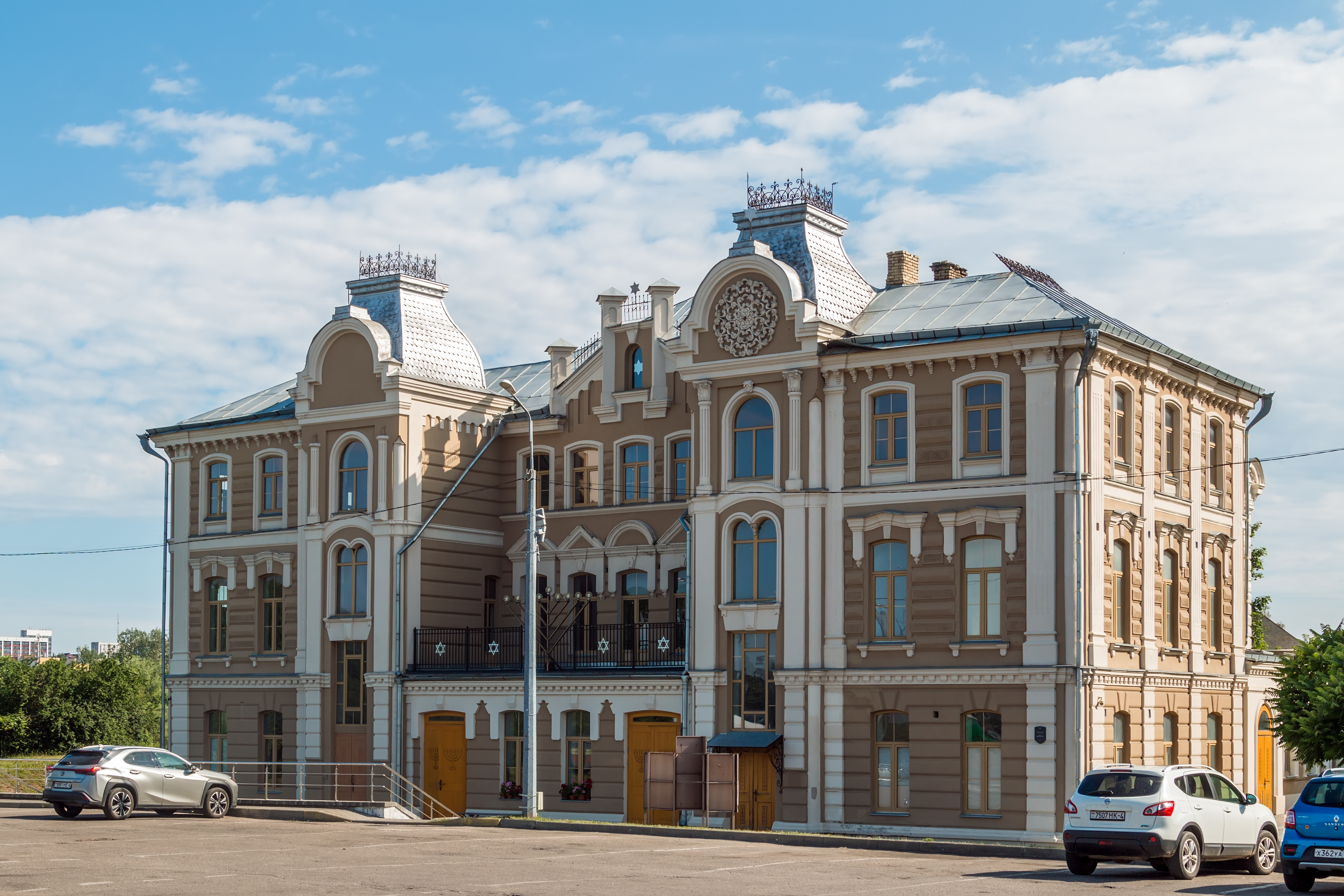
- The synagogue, in 2023

- Location in Belarus

Religion
- Affiliation: Orthodox Judaism
- Rite: Hasidic Judaism
- Ecclesiastical or organizational status: Synagogue
- Status: Active

Location
- Location: Vialikaja Trajeckaja Street 59a, Grodno 230023
- Country: Belarus
- Interactive map of Great Synagogue of Grodno
- Coordinates: 53°40′43″N 23°49′29″E

Architecture
- Architect: Iya Frunkin
- Type: Synagogue architecture
- Style: Gothic Revival; Moorish Revival
- Established: 1576 (as a congregation)
- Completed: 1905

Website
- jewishgrodno.com

The Great Synagogue of Grodno (Belarusian: Харальная сінагога, Горадня, Russian: Большая Хоральная синагога, Гродно), also known as the New Synagogue or the Choral Synagogue, is an Orthodox Hasidic Jewish synagogue, located on Vialikaja Trajeckaja Street, in Grodno (or Hrodna), Belarus. The building dates from the 16th century and was nominated for UNESCO World Heritage listing in 2007.

== History ==
The Great Synagogue of Grodno was built from 1576 to 1580 by Santi Gucci, who designed a wooden synagogue at Rabbi Mordechai Yoffe's invitation. However, this building burnt down in 1617.

The second synagogue was also burnt down in 1899. The Jewish community built another synagogue in the eclectic and Moorish style from 1902 to 1905. By 1907, the city boasted a state Jewish school, a girls' school, a craft shelter, a Talmud-Yeshiva, 107 Jewish primary schools, and 5 elementary schools for girls. There were also two Jewish libraries and several Jewish charitable organizations working in the city.

Jews played a very significant role in city life as industrialists, merchants, craftsmen, owners of printing houses, doctors, and teachers. There was said to be a special "Grodno Aura," created by its cultured and intelligent population. For this reason Grodno was considered to be one of the Jewish intellectual capitals of Europe.

The interior of the synagogue was vandalized in 1941 by Nazis. Soviet authorities closed the synagogue in 1944. The synagogue was returned to the Jewish community in 1991; and was subsequently restored under the direction of Rabbi Yitzchok Kofman. However, in 2013, the synagogue was again destroyed by fire. The synagogue has since been restored and is in use.

== Notable members ==
- Léon Bakst, an artist
- Ilya Gintsburg, a sculptor
- L. L. Zamenhof, the founder of Esperanto
- Herman Yablokoff (born Chaim Yablonik), the composer of Papirossen
- Avram-Shalom Friedberg (Авроом-Шолом Фридберг), a Hebrew translator

== Gallery ==
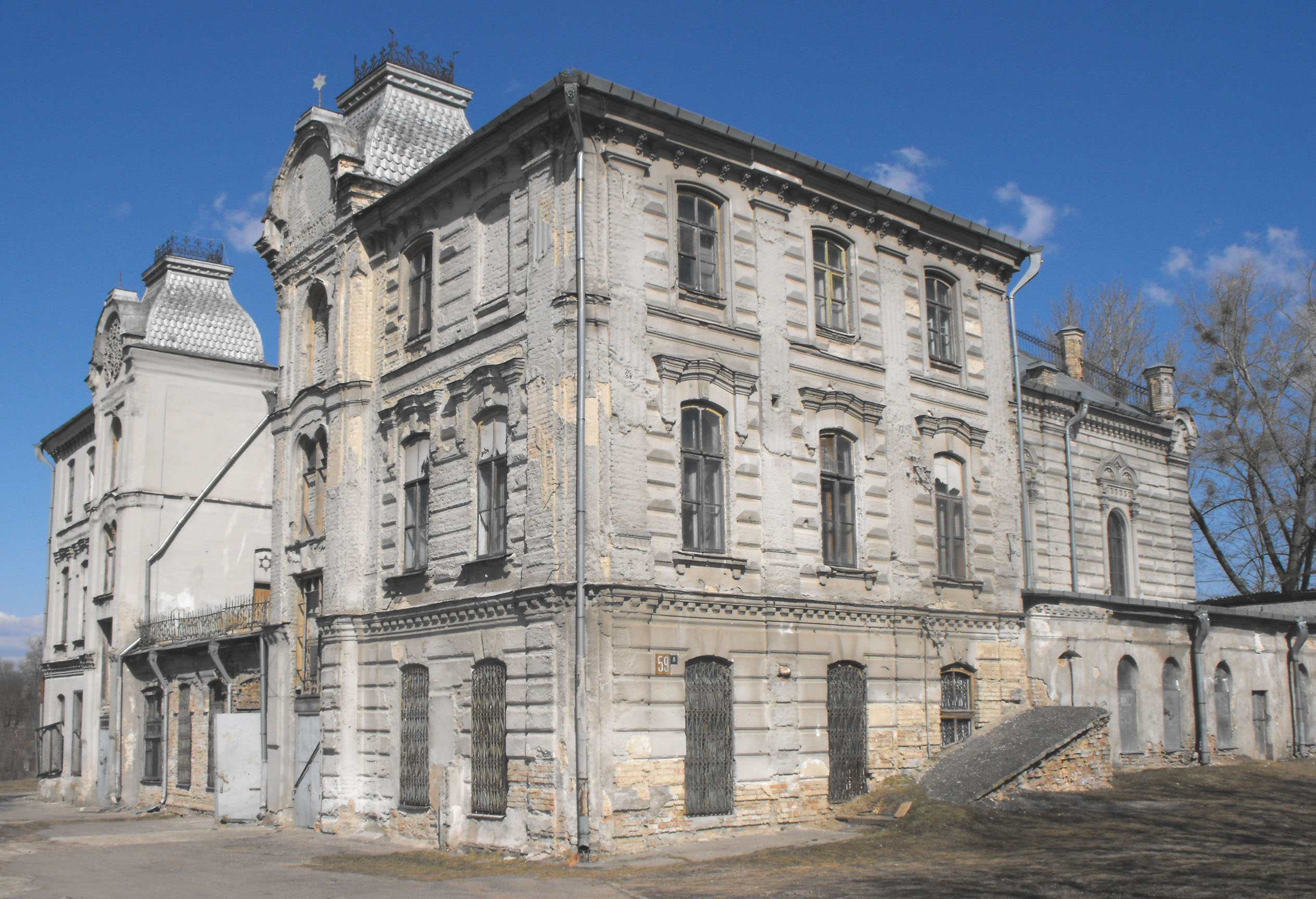

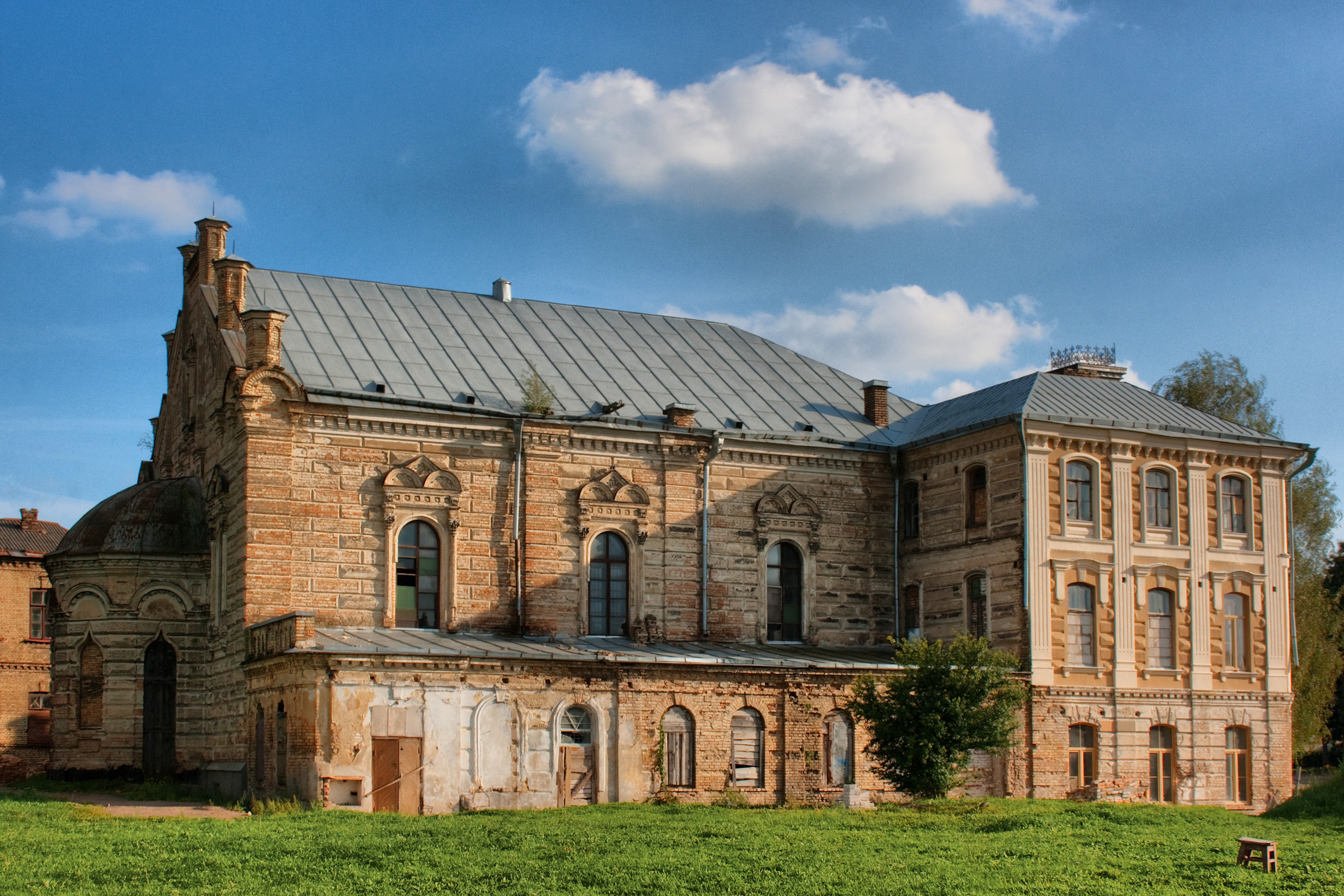

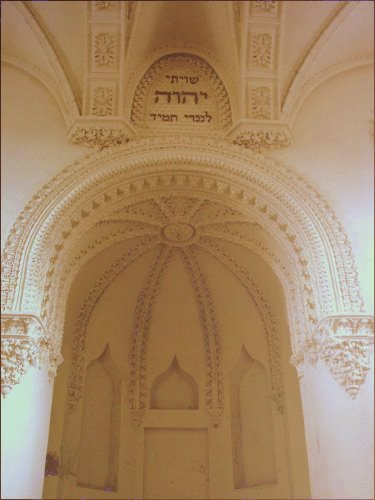

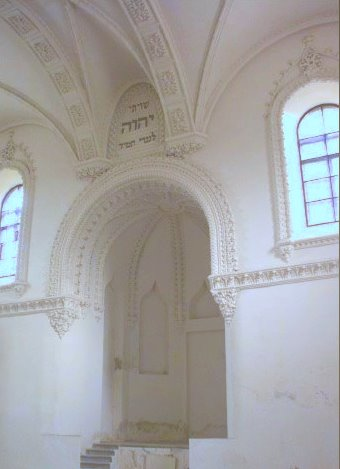

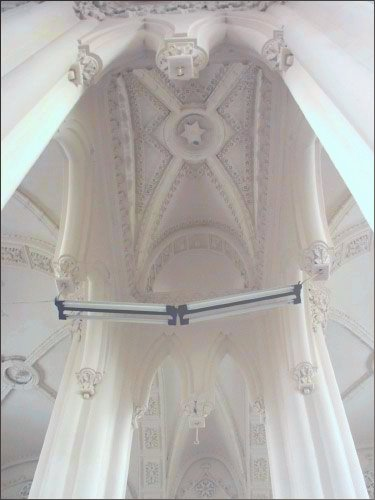

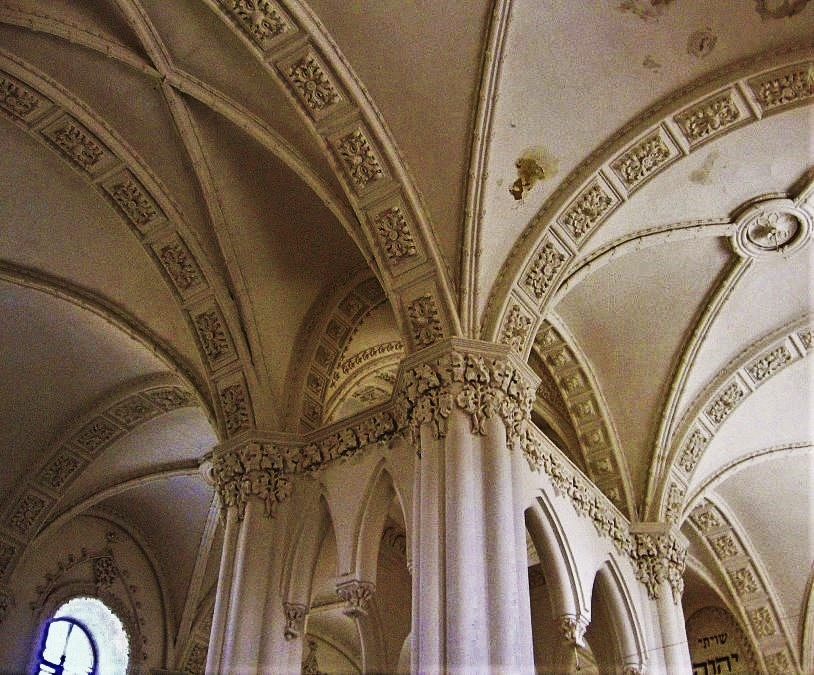

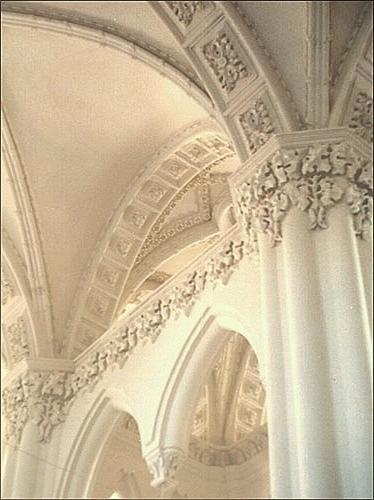

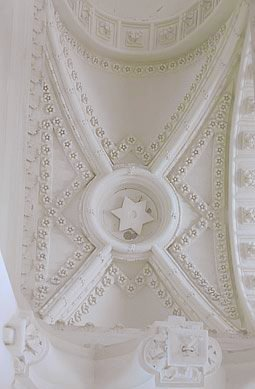
