= Choral Synagogue (Vilnius) =

Orthodox synagogue in Vilnius, Lithuania

Choral Synagogue of Vilnius
- Lithuanian: Vilniaus choralinė sinagoga
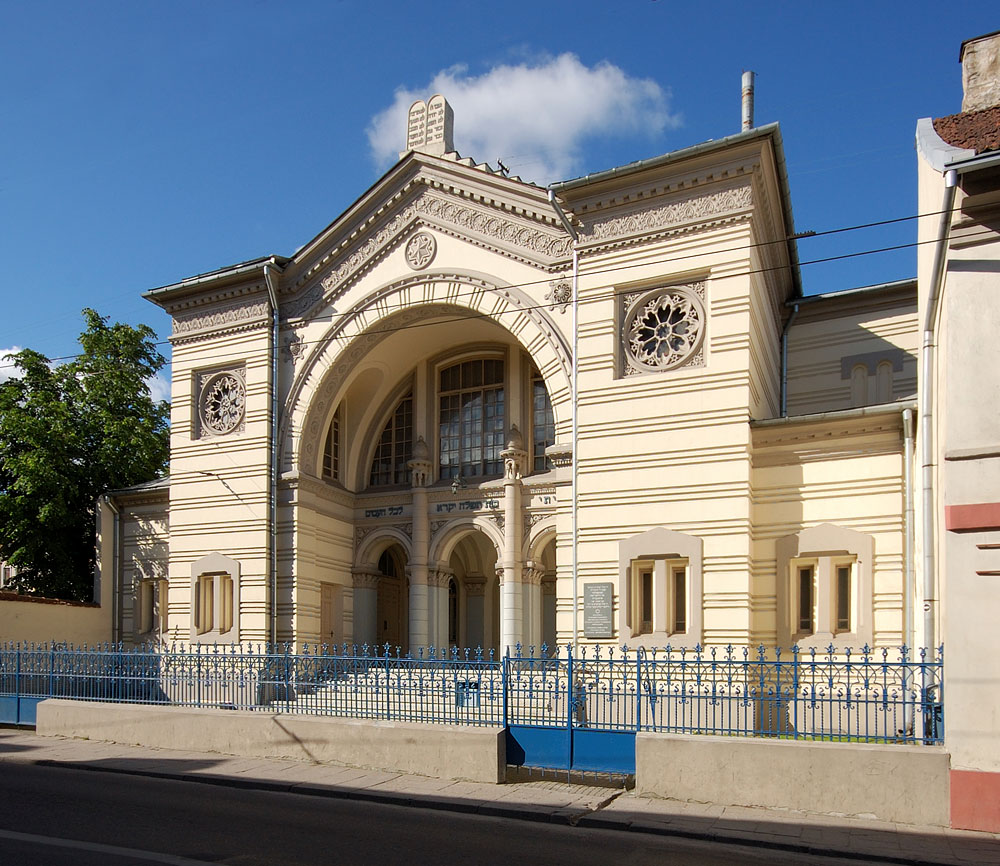
- The synagogue in 2008

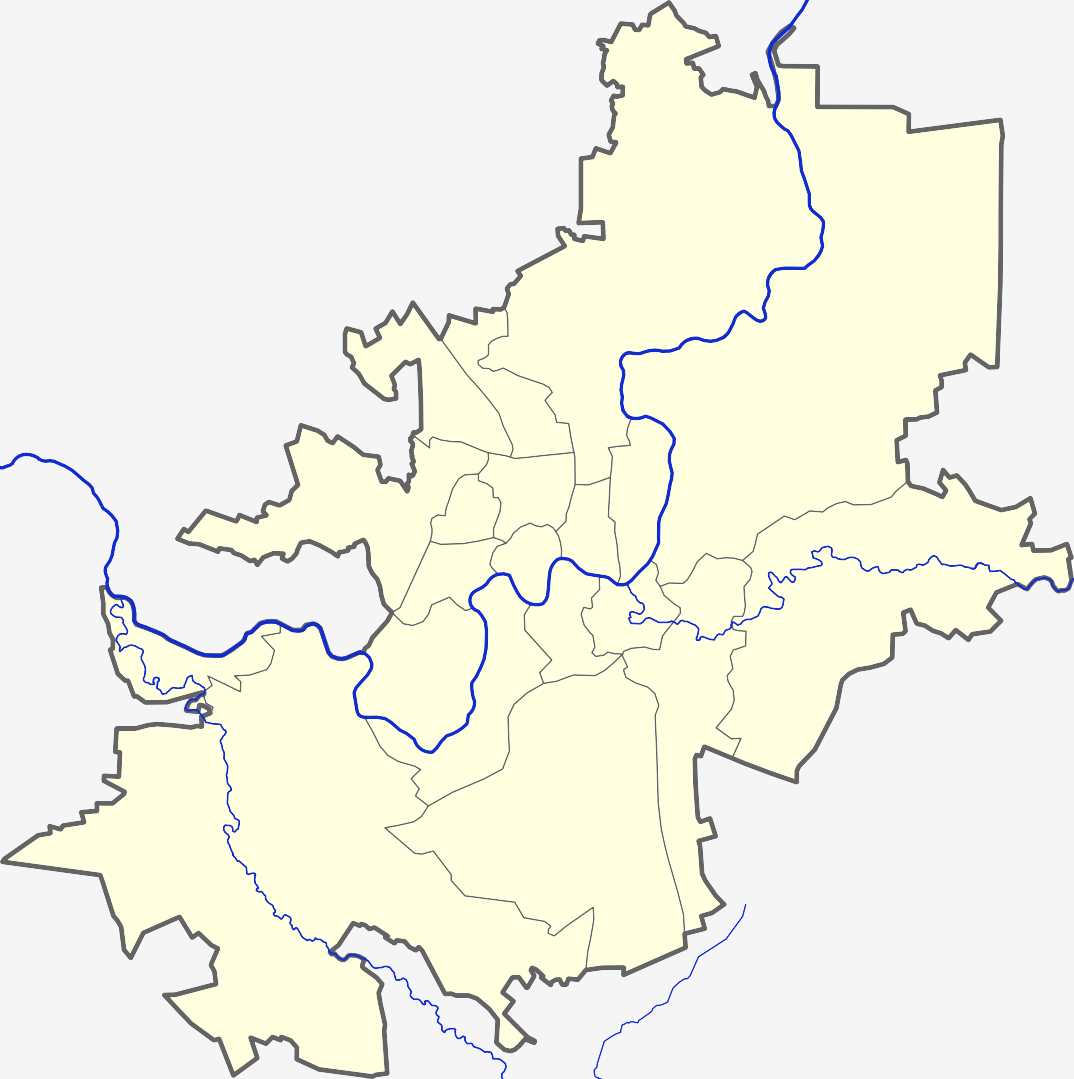
- Location of the synagogue in Vilnius

Religion
- Affiliation: Orthodox Judaism
- Rite: Nusach Ashkenaz
- Ecclesiastical or organisational status: Synagogue (1903–1940); Profane use (1940–1991); Synagogue (since 2010)
- Status: Active

Location
- Location: 39 Pylimo Street, Vilnius' Old Town, Vilnius, Vilnius County
- Country: Lithuania
- Coordinates: 54°40′34″N 25°16′53″E

Architecture
- Architects: Dovydas Rosenhauzas (Daniel Rosenhaus); Aleksejus Polozovas
- Type: Synagogue architecture
- Style: Romanesque Revival; Moorish Revival
- Established: 1847 (as a congregation)
- Groundbreaking: 1902
- Completed: 1903
- Materials: Brick

The Choral Synagogue of Vilnius (Lithuanian: Vilniaus choralinė sinagoga), officially, Taharat Ha-Kodesh Choral Synagogue in Vilnius, is an Orthodox Jewish congregation and synagogue, located at 39 Pylimo Street (originally Zawalna Street), in the Old Town of Vilnius, in the Vilnius County of Lithuania.

Designed by Daniel Rosenhaus and Aleksejus Polozovas in an eclectic combination of the Romanesque Revival and Moorish Revival styles, the building was completed in 1903.

The Choral Synagogue is the only synagogue in Vilnius that is in use. All other synagogues were completely destroyed or partly desecrated during World War II, when Lithuania was occupied by Nazi Germany, and by the Soviet authorities after the war.

== History ==
It is the only active synagogue that survived both the Holocaust and Soviet rule in Vilnius, that once had over 100 synagogues. Despite practising in the Orthodox Ashkenazi rite, the synagogue was built in the traditions of a community that practised Reform Judaism.

The exterior of this unusual, very attractive Moorish-styled synagogue features two-tone brick, used to create horizontal lines in the façade. There are three arches above the entrance with a large arch above it all, featuring stained glass windows below the arch and interesting moldings highlighting the arch and the façade above it. Stained glass windows with intricate Moorish detailing are featured on towers on either side of the entrance. Below the roofline, repeated Moorish motifs are incorporated into the molding to stunning effect. Above the pitch of the roof rests two tablets, featuring the Ten Commandments inscribed in Hebrew. According to one source, the synagogue was not attractive:

The new choral synagogue ... lost all relation to the tradition of Jewish synagogues in Poland, and is an uninspired, international edifice aspiring to the Moorish style.

— Juliusz Kłos ,1923

During the Soviet occupation the synagogue was nationalised and the building was turned into a metal factory, with subsequent considerable damage as a result of this use. The building was restored in 2010 and opened again as a synagogue shortly thereafter. International donations and a small community of Jews in Vilnius support the synagogue. The synagogue holds services and is open to visitors.

In 2019, the synagogue along with the Jewish community headquarters was temporarily closed due to threats from right-wing groups. The decision coincided with a rise in antisemitic rhetoric related to public debate about honoring Lithuanian collaborators.

== Gallery ==
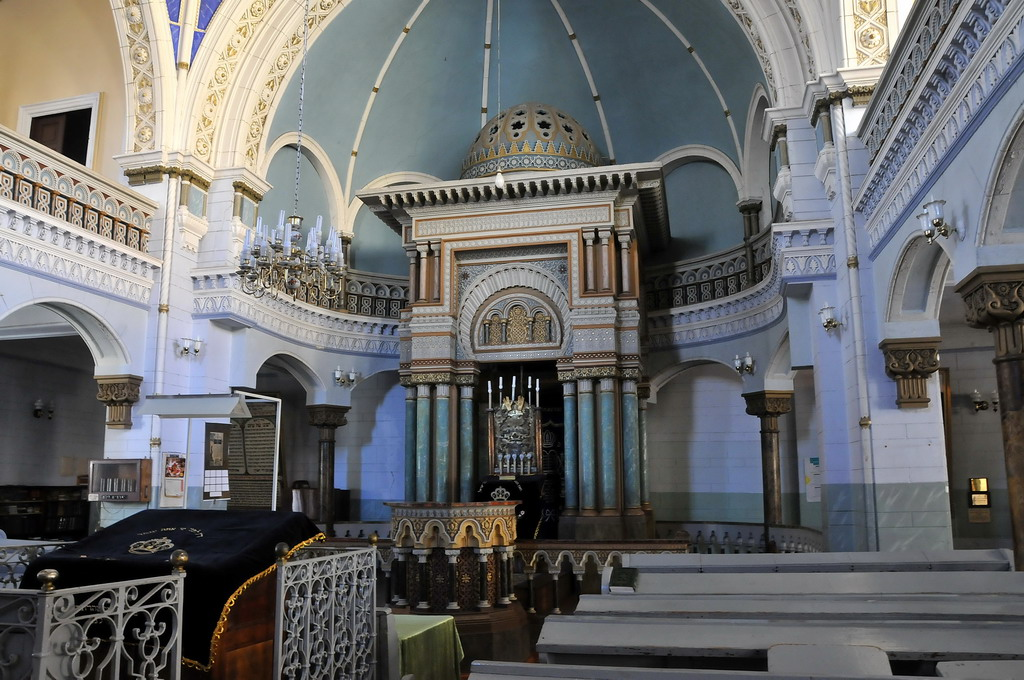
Synagogue interior

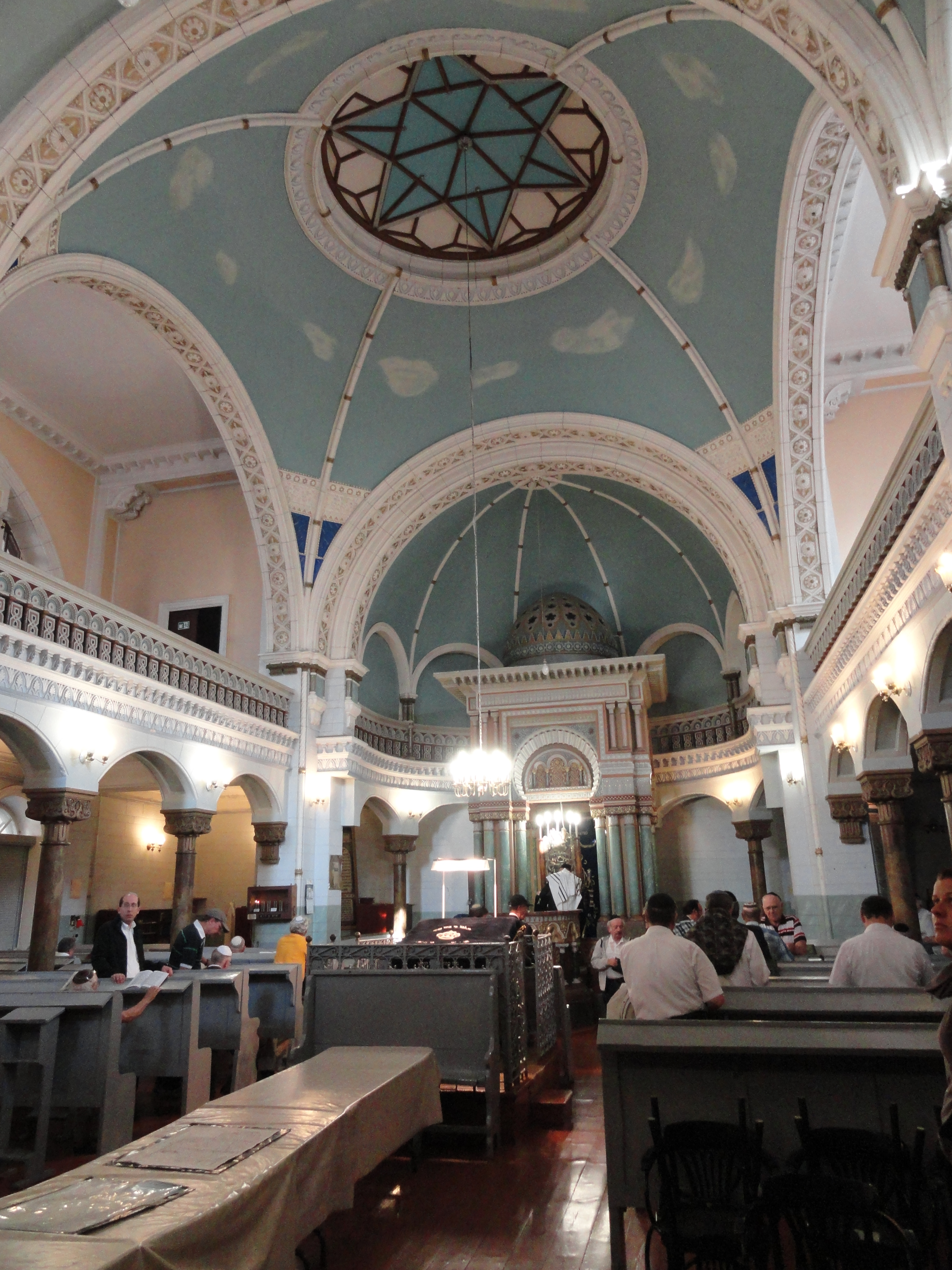
Synagogue interior

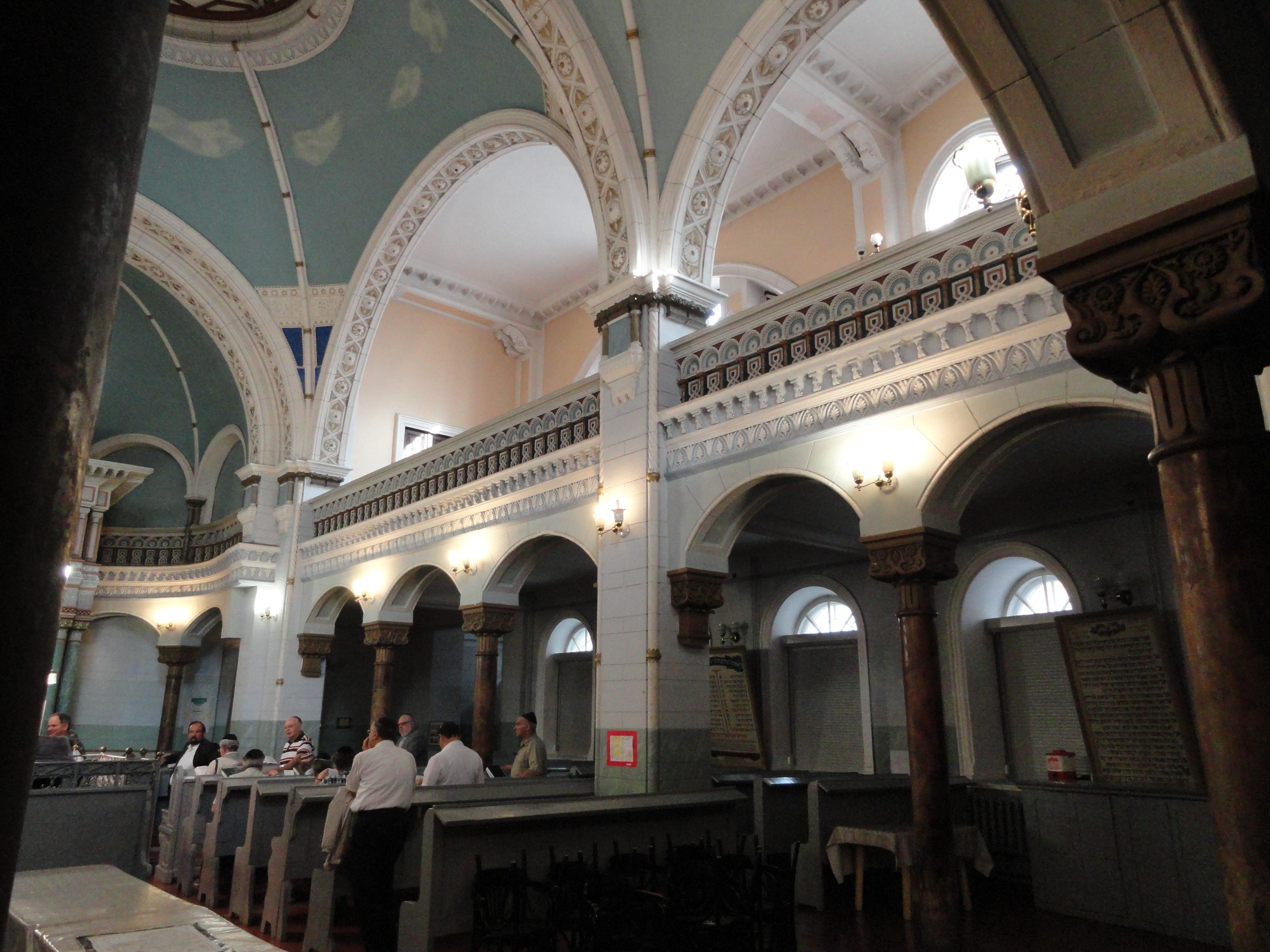
Synagogue interior

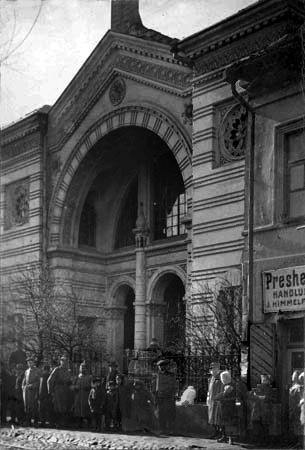
Synagogue in 1916

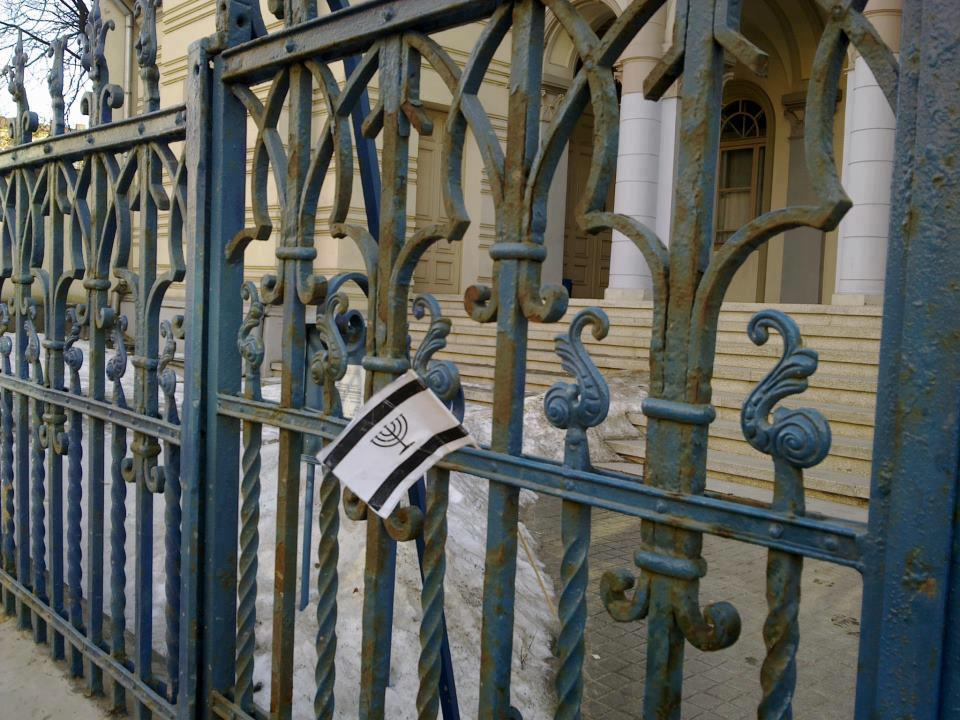
A Yiddish flag on the synagogue's fence

== See also ==
- History of the Jews in Lithuania
- Lithuanian Jews
