= Choral Synagogue (Smolensk) =

Former synagogue in Smolensk, Smolensk Oblast, Russia

- Russian: Синагога (Смоленск)
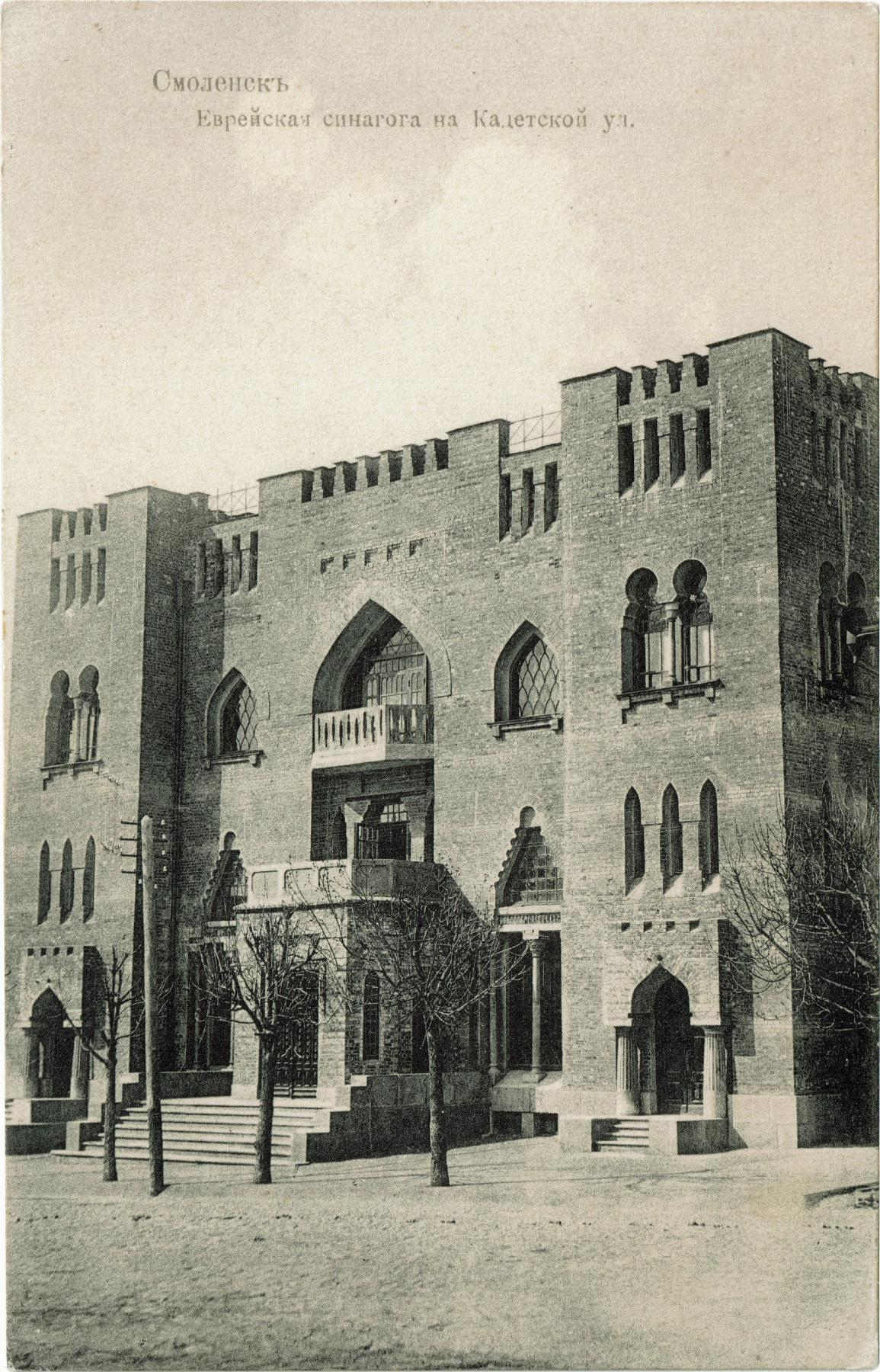
- A postcard of the former synagogue in 1913

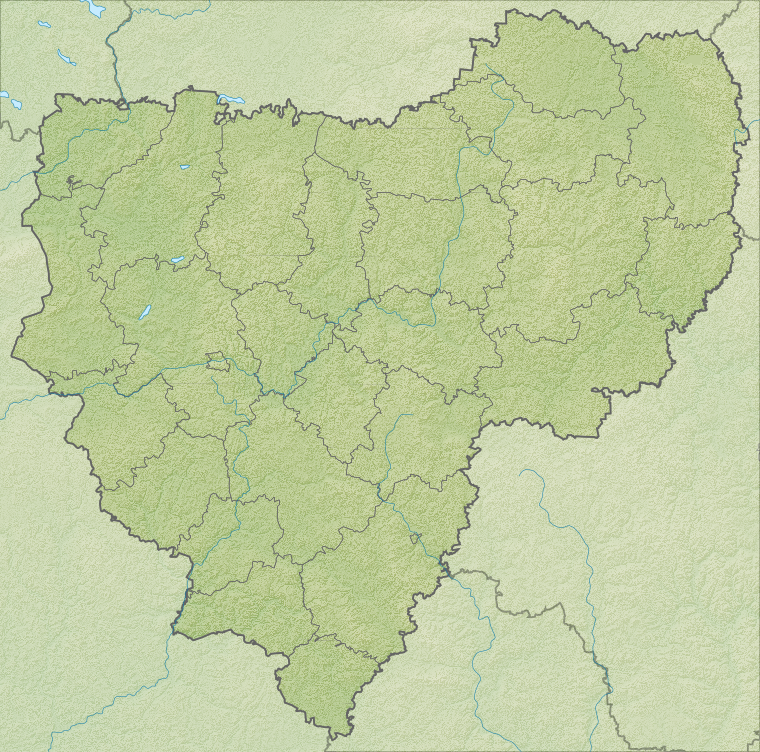
- Location of the former synagogue in the Smolensk Oblast

Religion
- Affiliation: Judaism (former)
- Ecclesiastical or organizational status: Synagogue (1914–1922); Vocational school
- Ownership: Smolensk College of Telecommunications
- Status: Inactive (as a synagogue); Repurposed

Location
- Location: Ulitsa Isakovskogo 9, Smolensk, Smolensk Oblast
- Country: Russia
- Interactive map of Choral Synagogue
- Coordinates: 54°46′49″N 32°03′26″E

Architecture
- Architect: Nikolai Zaputriaev
- Type: Synagogue architecture
- Style: Moorish Revival
- Groundbreaking: 1909
- Completed: 1914
- Dome: Three (removed)

The Choral Synagogue (Russian: Синагога (Смоленск)) is a former Jewish congregation and synagogue, that is located at Ulitsa Isakovskogo 9, in Smolensk, in the Smolensk Oblast of Russia. Designed by Nikolai Zaputriaev in the Moorish Revival style, the synagogue was completed in 1914. However, by 1922, the building and its contents were confiscated by Soviet authorities. The site of the former synagogue has subsequently been used as a vocational school and is owned by the Smolensk College of Telecommunications.

There are now two synagogues and five chadarim in Smolensk.

== History ==
Jews were first recorded in Smolensk in the 15th century, when Prince Vytautas of Lithuania got Smolensk in 1404 and granted it the Magdeburg rights and other privileges. 1728 the Jewish businessmen acquired the right to come in Smolensk on trading affairs. 4,600 Jews, 10% of the total population, were mentioned in Smolensk in the 19th century. Though Smolensk was not included into the Pale of Settlement, in the 18th and 19th centuries the number of Jews in the city gradually increased and in 1896 had reached 4,651 people (about ten percent of the city's population).

Jews traded in wood, flax and grain and were engaged in financial activities. In the beginning of the 20th century in Smolensk there were two synagogues and five chadarim and a Jewish initial school created on the basis of the Talmud. The society of the help to the poor Jews was founded in 1898.

In 1910, the Jews of Smolensk were victims of a bloody pogrom; in city there were rabble-rousing conditions. During World War I a large number of Jews arrived in Smolensk, who had fled or were evicted from the front line, in particular from Latvia. After an establishment in Smolensk under the Soviet authority (November, 1917) a gradual liquidation of the Jewish establishments began. In 1922 the Choral Synagogue was confiscated by the Soviet authorities.

By 1926, the number of Jews in the city reached 12,887 people (16.2% of all population). The Jewish pedagogical school working under the aegis of Yevsektsiya was moved from Gomel to Smolensk in 1929. 13,000 Jews, 8% of the total population, were in Smolensk before the beginning of World War II.

In days of fights for Smolensk many Jews were lost, the part ran from city. After Smolensk was occupied, the Nazis created a Jewish ghetto in the suburb of Sadki and drove there about two thousand the Jews remaining in the city and its vicinity. By December 1941 all of them were destroyed. According to population census, in 1959 there were 3,929 Jews in Smolensk; in 1970 there were 3,662; in 1979 there were 3,223; and in 1989 there were 2,645 Jews. There were no synagogues in the city during the post-war period. The number of Jews in the Smolensk area in 1959 was 5,991 people; in 1970 there were 5,316; in 1979 there were 4,451; and in 1989 there were 3,536 Jews.

Today the former Choral Synagogue is used as a vocational school.

== See also ==
- History of the Jews in Russia
- List of synagogues in Russia
