= Anatevka, Ukraine =

Ukrainian refugee settlement

Anatevka
- Settlement
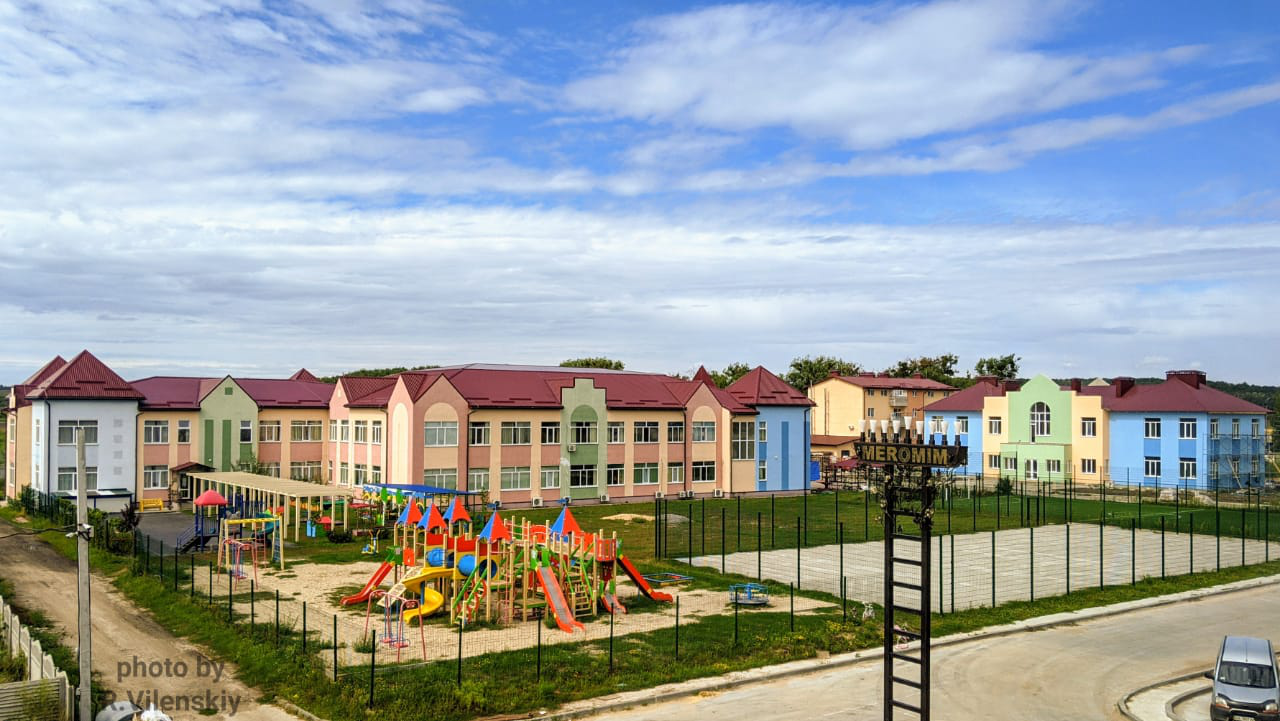
- View of Anatevka

- Anatevka in Ukraine Anatevka (Kyiv Oblast)
- Country: Ukraine
- Oblast: Kyiv Oblast
- Raion: Bucha Raion
- Hromada: Bilohorodka rural hromada
- Village: Hnativka
- Founded: 2015

Government
  - Rabbi: Moshe Reuven Azman
- Website: web.archive.org/web/20221025213116/https://www.anatevka.com

Anatevka (Ukrainian: Анатівка, romanized: Anativka; Yiddish: אנאטעוועקע, romanized: Anatevke) is a Ukrainian refugee settlement that provides food, housing, education, and medical support for refugees of the 2014 Russian invasion and the 2022 Russian invasion of Ukraine. The settlement was established in 2015 and currently houses hundreds of families. The settlement was established by Harav Moshe Reuven Azman, the Chief Rabbi of Ukraine and Kyiv.

The settlement is located on the outskirts of Kyiv, in the village of Hnativka near Bilohorodka.

== History ==
=== Establishment ===
In 2014, Ukraine was invaded by Russia. In response to the invasion, which displaced tens of thousands of people (including thousands of Jews), Anatevka was established on a plot of empty land, near Kyiv. The project was overseen by Chief Rabbi Moshe Reuven Azman, leaders in both America and Ukraine, and Chaim Klimovitsky. The name was inspired by the famous fictional shtetl of Anatevka from the 1964 Broadway musical Fiddler on the Roof (which, in turn, was based on a cycle of short stories by Ukraine-born Jewish writer Sholem Aleichem). The settlement was created in order to serve as a safe community for refugees, offering them housing in furbished apartments, access to a Jewish education system, healthcare and mental health support, and community events.

Over the ensuing years, the settlement grew to include apartments which housed refugee families. The community also came to include a kindergarten, a first through tenth grade school (called Mitzvah 613), a Cheder (a traditional Jewish elementary school), a soccer field, a playground, a kosher hotel, and other Jewish infrastructure including a synagogue and a mikveh.

=== 2022 Russian invasion ===
In response to the Russian invasion in 2022, given Anatevka’s strategic position away from Russian attack targets, the settlement quickly became a staging ground and operational headquarters for humanitarian efforts. Many refugees were evacuated through Anatevka, stopping there for a warm meal or immediate medical care before continuing on to the Moldovan border.

== Infrastructure ==
Anatevka supports a wide range of infrastructure. There are close to a hundred apartments in the settlement that house refugee families. There is also a kosher hotel which hosts tourists. There is also a mikveh, a synagogue, and a community center.

== Education ==
Anatevka includes a Jewish education system. The educational system includes the Mitzvah 613 school, a girls' school, a Cheder which provides Jewish elementary education, a woodworking shop, a football field, and a playground. The educational system includes over 200 students and is one of the only Jewish schools in the surrounding area. Many students travel cross-country to attend the school.

Since the 2022 war, the school system has operated online due to the lack of funding necessary to build a bomb shelter.

== Gallery ==
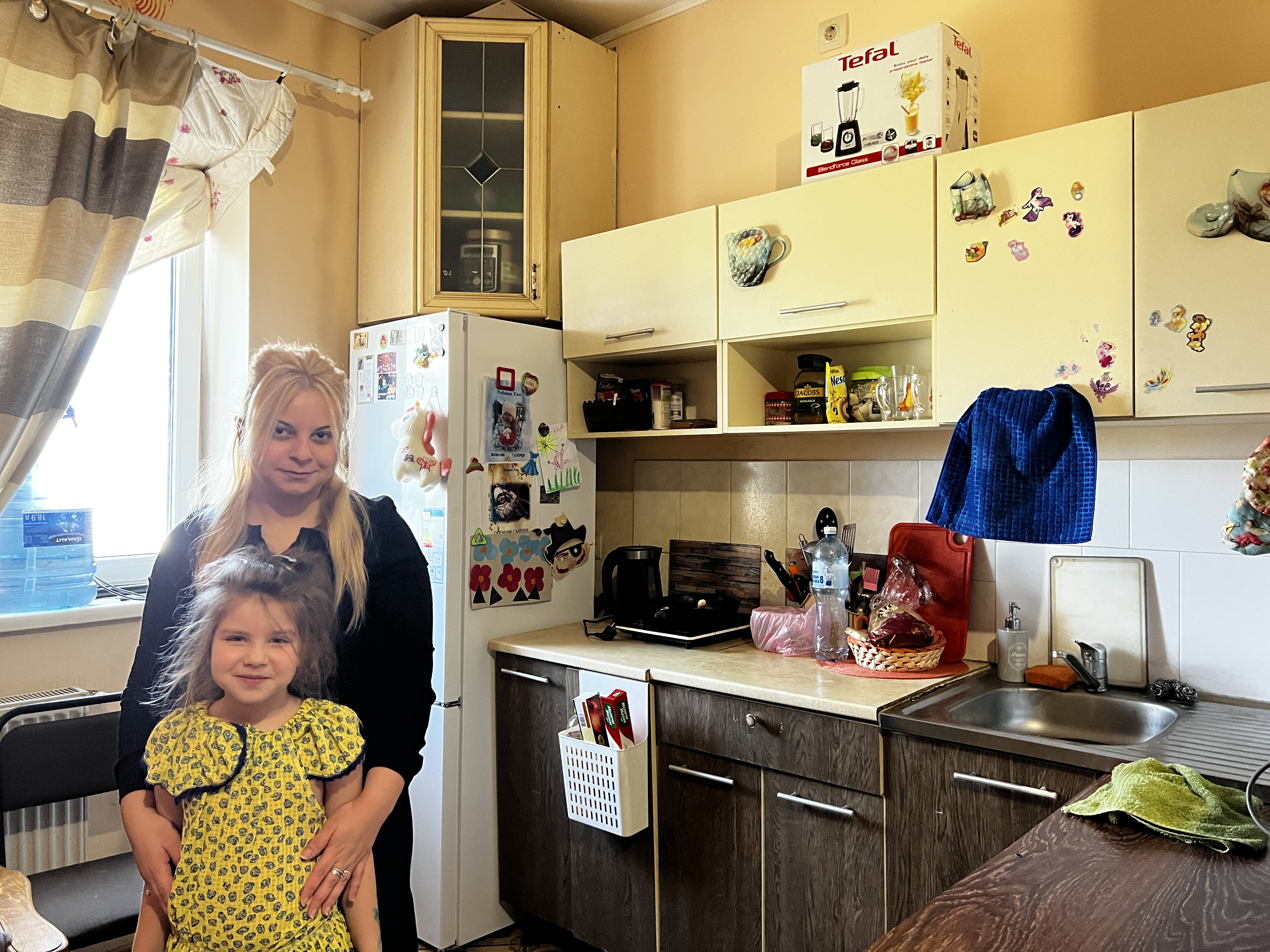
A family in their apartment in Anatevka

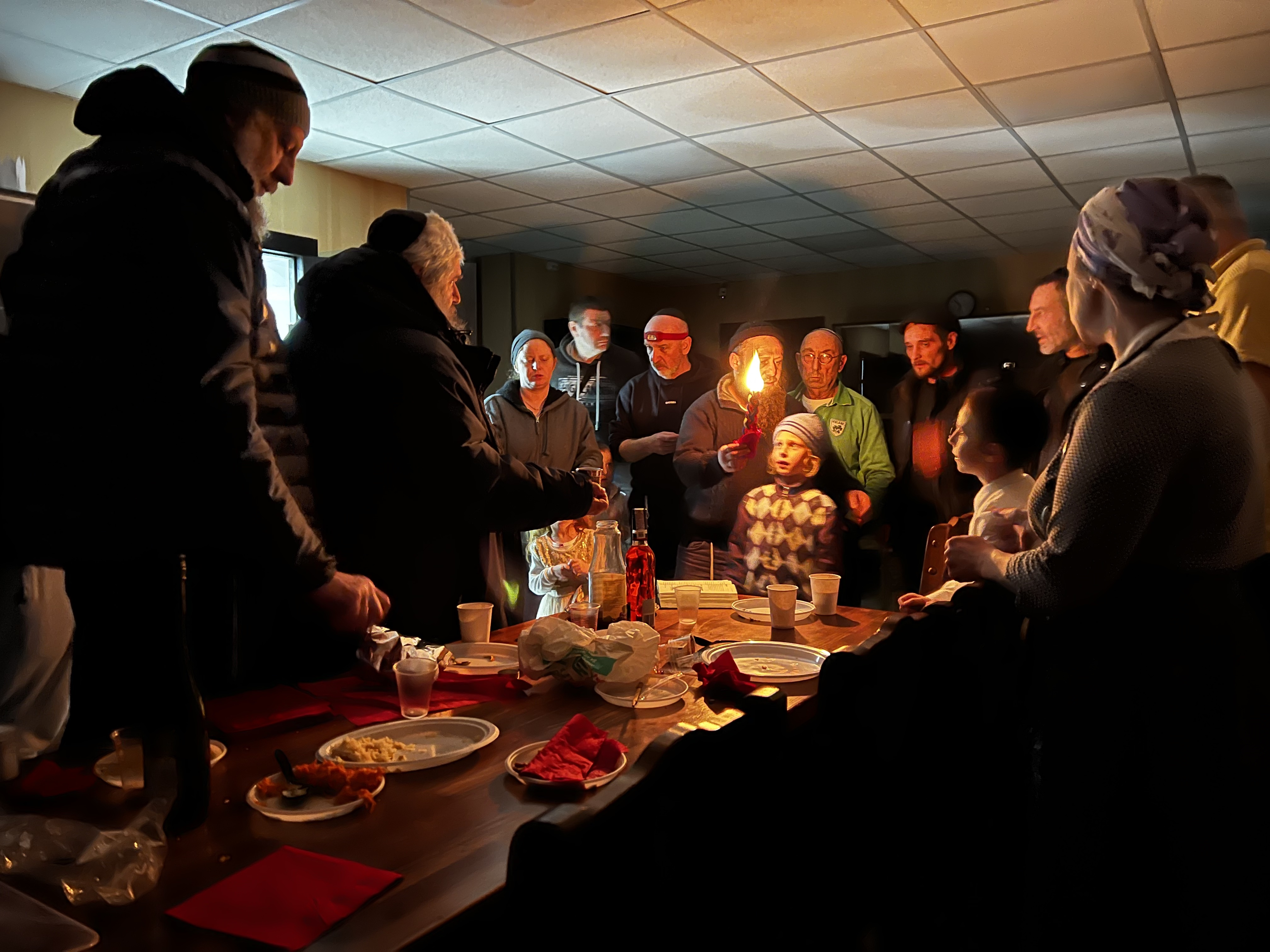
Refugees gathering

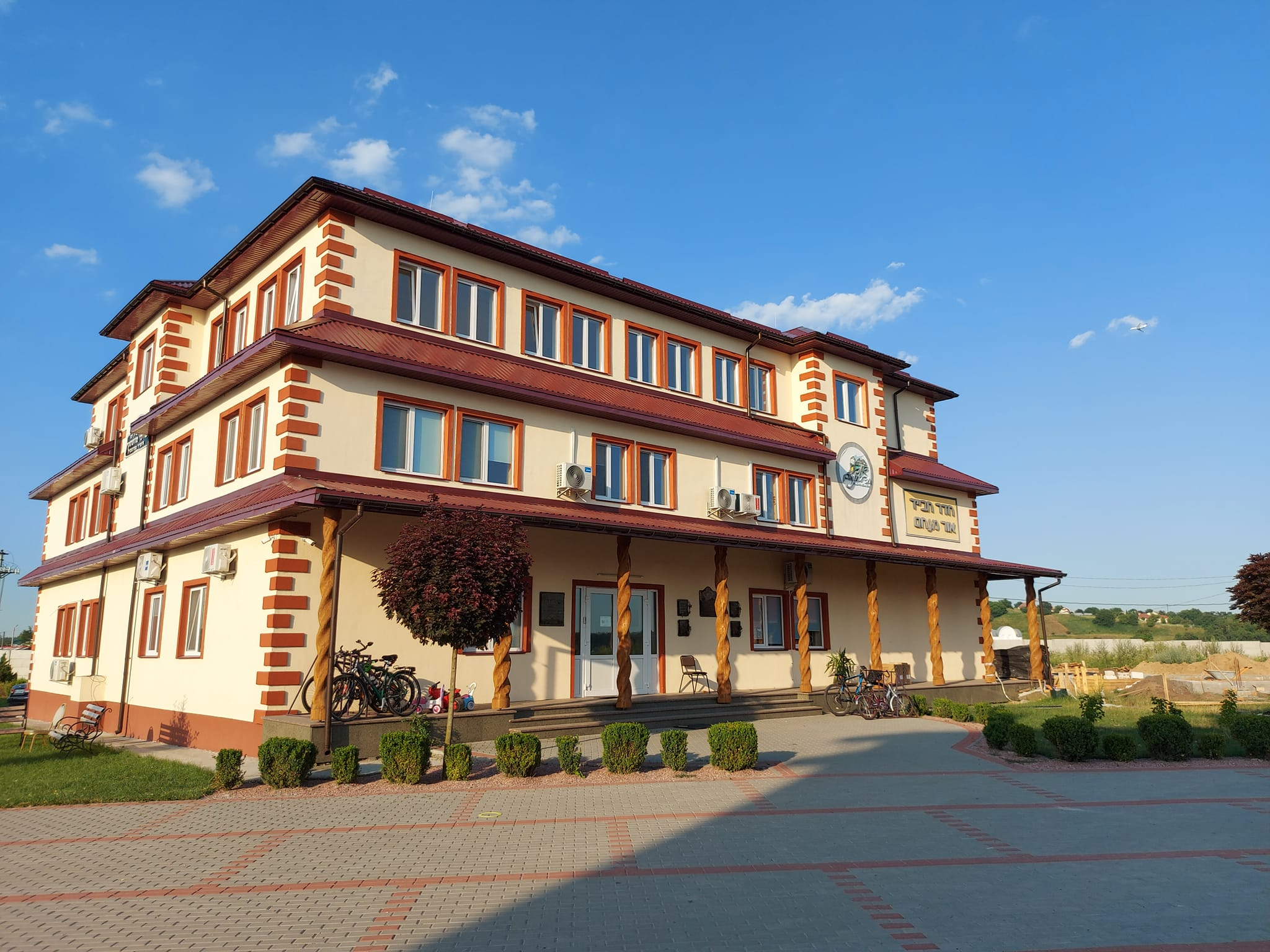
Hotel

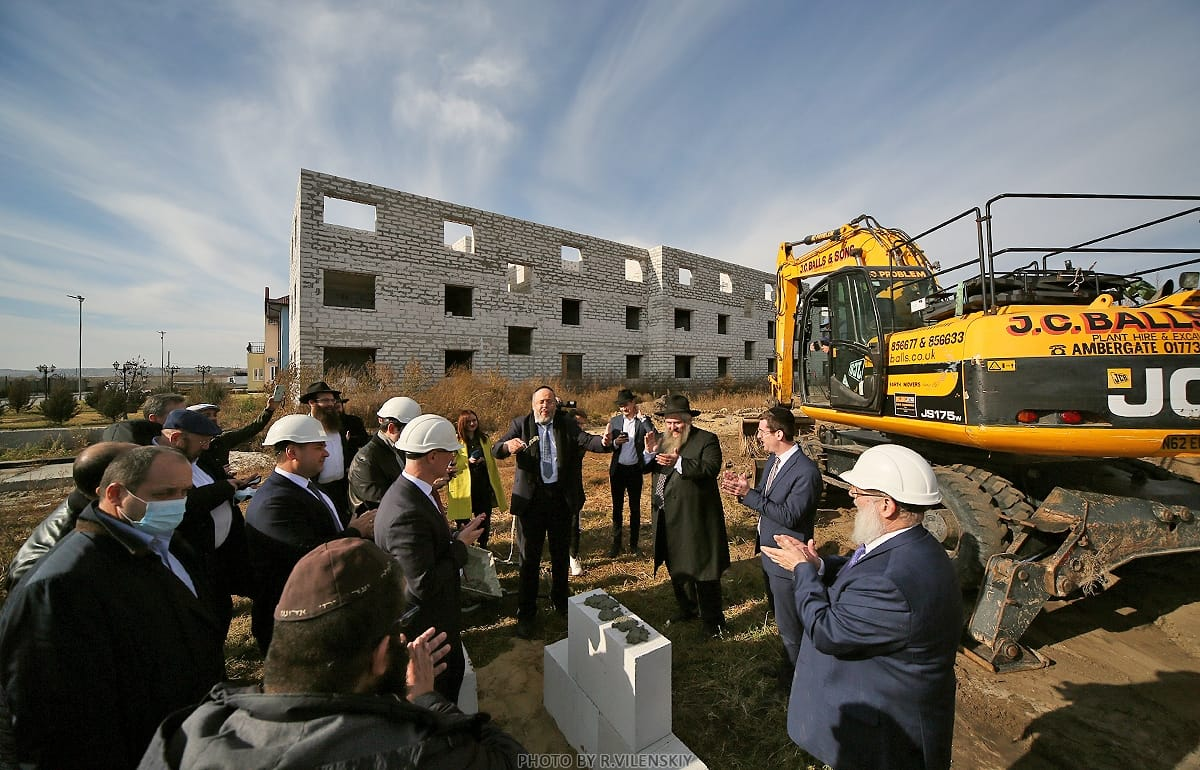
The Ceremonial Building

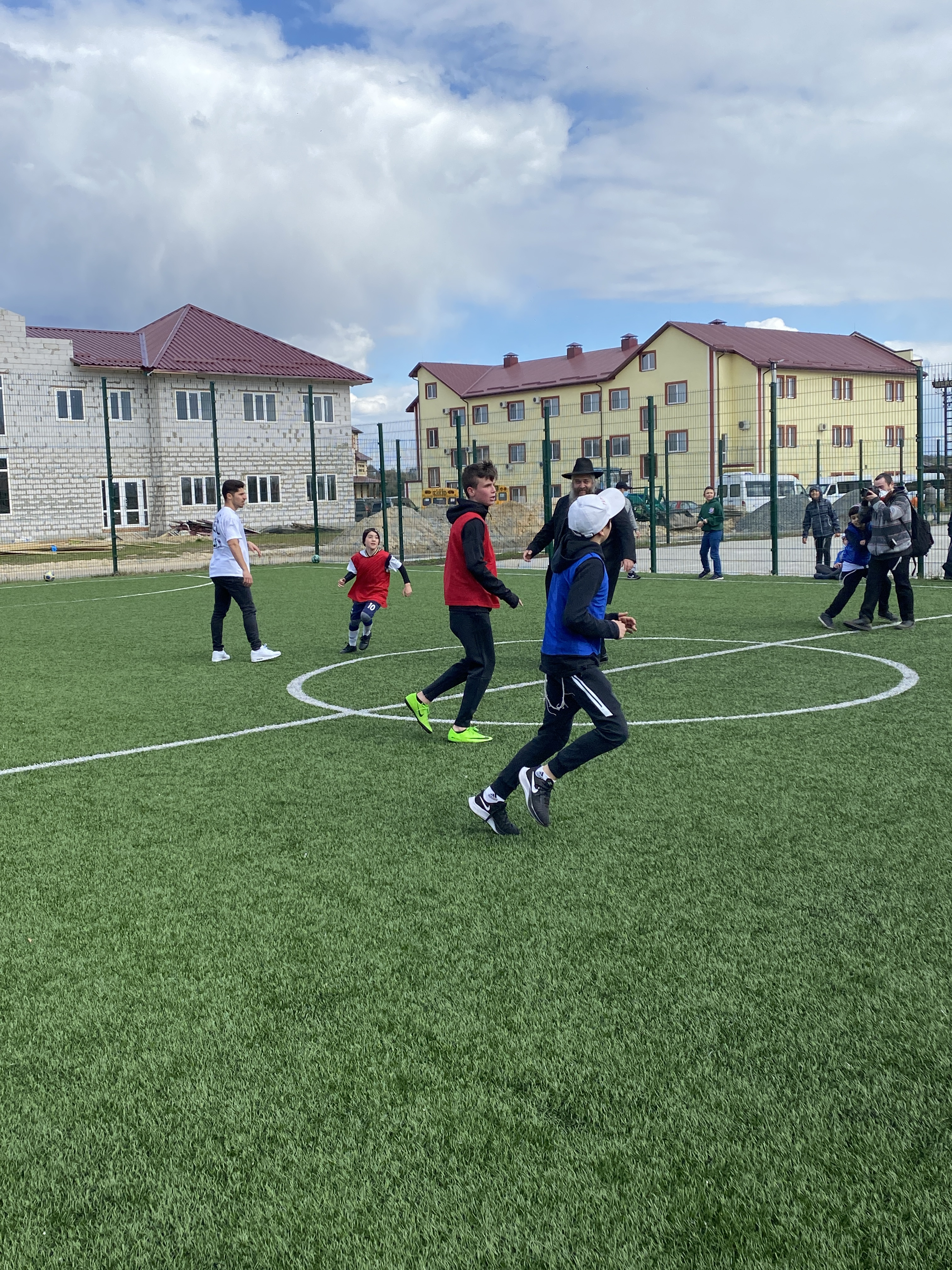
Football field

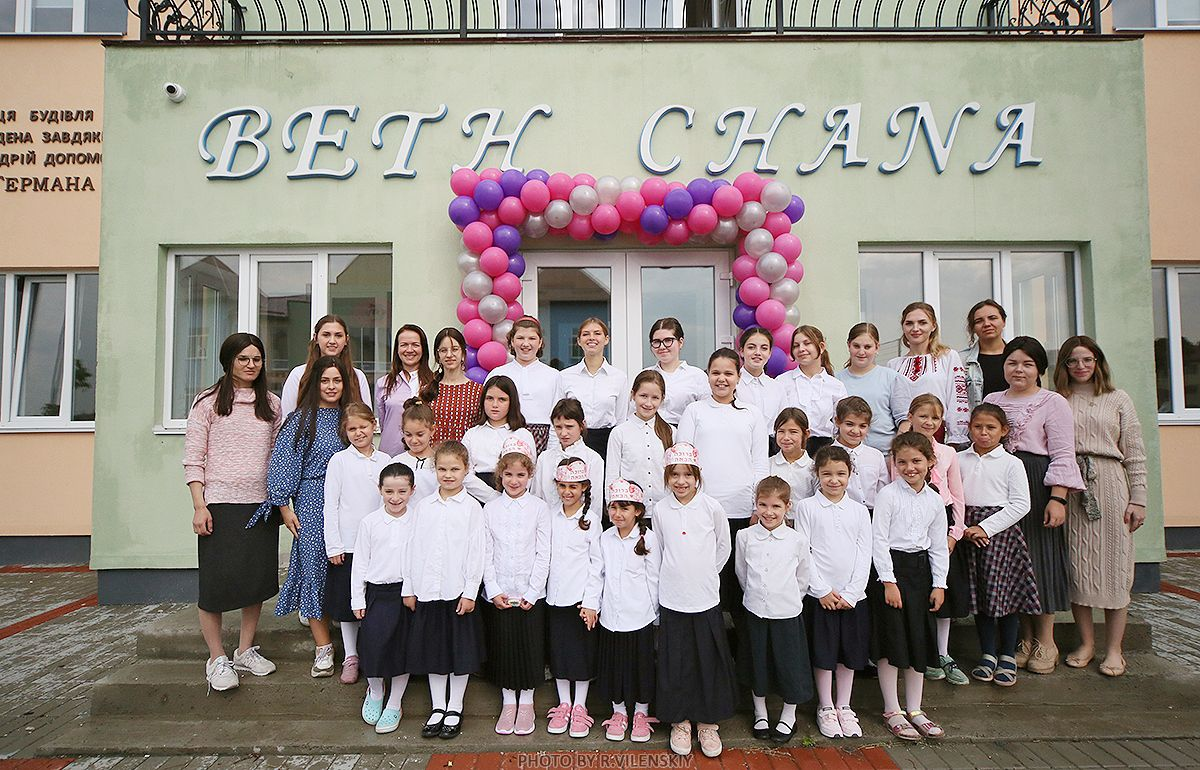
The Girls' School
