= Aesopian =

Aesopian may refer to:

- Aesop (c. 620–564 BCE), Ancient Greek fabulist
- Aesopian language, communications that convey an innocent meaning to outsiders but hold a concealed meaning to informed members of a conspiracy or underground movement
- Aesopian synagogue, a synagogue built with its true purpose disguised
