= Halytska Synagogue =

Orthodox synagogue in Kyiv, Ukraine

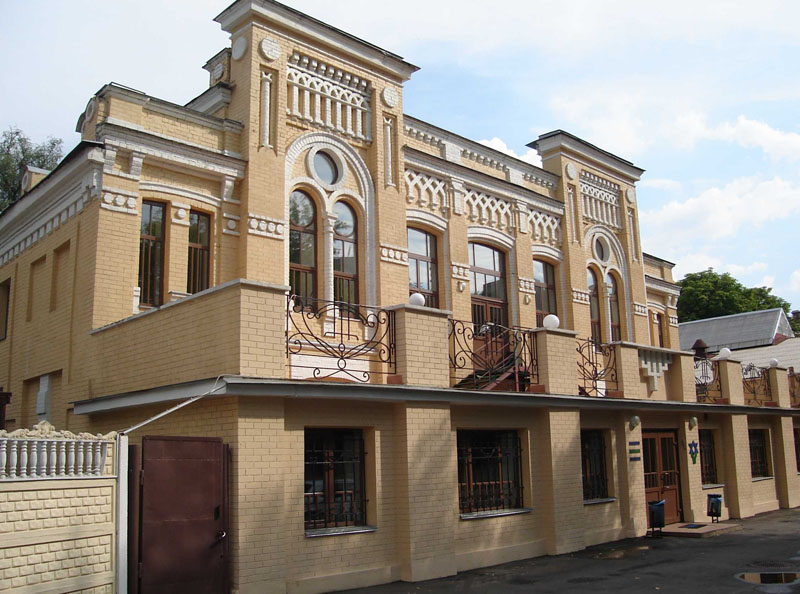
- The restored synagogue in 2012

- Location of the synagogue in Ukraine

Religion
- Affiliation: Orthodox Judaism
- Rite: Nusach Ashkenaz
- Ecclesiastical or organizational status: Synagogue (1910–1930); Workers' canteen (1930s–c. 2000); Synagogue (since 2004)
- Ownership: Rabbi Yaakov Bleich Chief Rabbi of Ukraine
- Leadership: Rabbi Yaakov Bleich Chief Rabbi of Ukraine
- Status: Active

Location
- Location: 97a Zhylianska Street, Kyiv
- Country: Ukraine
- Interactive map of Halytska Synagogue
- Coordinates: 50°26′45″N 30°29′17″E

Architecture
- Architect: Fedir Mefodiovich Oltarzhevsky
- Type: Aesopian synagogue architecture
- Style: Moorish Revival; Romanesque Revival; Byzantine Revival
- Completed: 1909; 2004 (restoration)

The Halytska Synagogue, also called the Galitska Synagogue or Beit Yaakov Shul, is an Orthodox Jewish synagogue, located at 97a Zhylianska Street, in Kyiv, Ukraine. The congregation worships in the Ashkenazi rite.

== History ==
The Aesopian synagogue was built in 1909 in a Moorish Revival style. The façade is Romanesque Revival, with Byzantine Revival elements. The building was devastated during the World War II by Nazis. For the next fifty years it was used as a workers' canteen of the "Transsignal" electrotechnical plant.

From 2002 to 2004, the building was restored and, as of February 2022, it was reported as being active. Since the synagogue's restoration, the Jewish Agency established Midrasha Zionit, a learning center located at the synagogue. The Zionist learning center has afternoon and evening courses on key aspects of Jewish history, tradition, and ideology, including Hebrew and Tanakh classes.

== Gallery ==
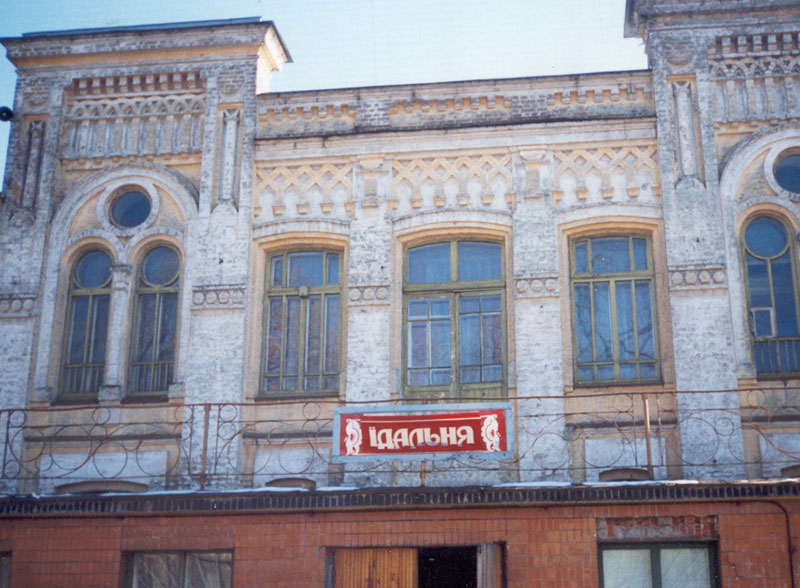
Building façade in 1990s when it served as a workers' canteen

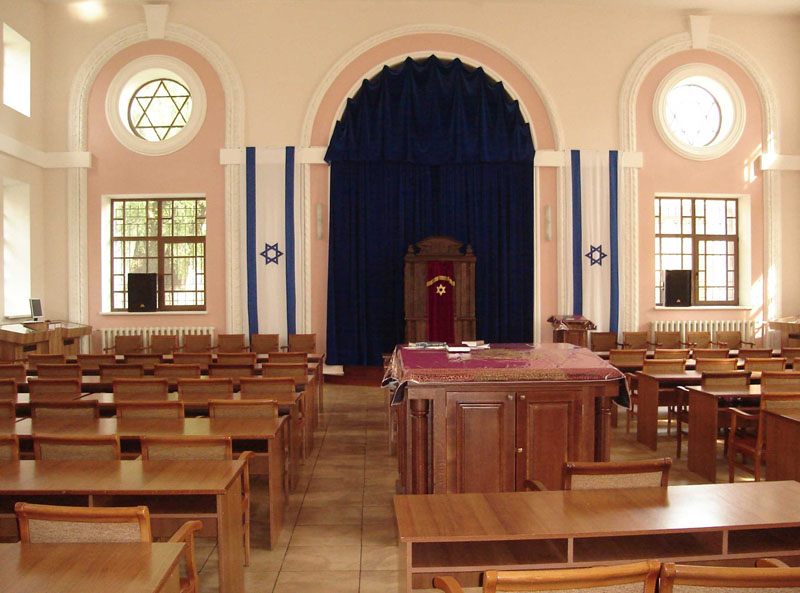
Prayer hall

== See also ==
- History of the Jews in Kyiv
- History of the Jews in Ukraine
- List of synagogues in Ukraine
