= Brodsky Synagogue (Kyiv) =

Synagogue in Kyiv, Ukraine

- Ukrainian: Синагога Бродського
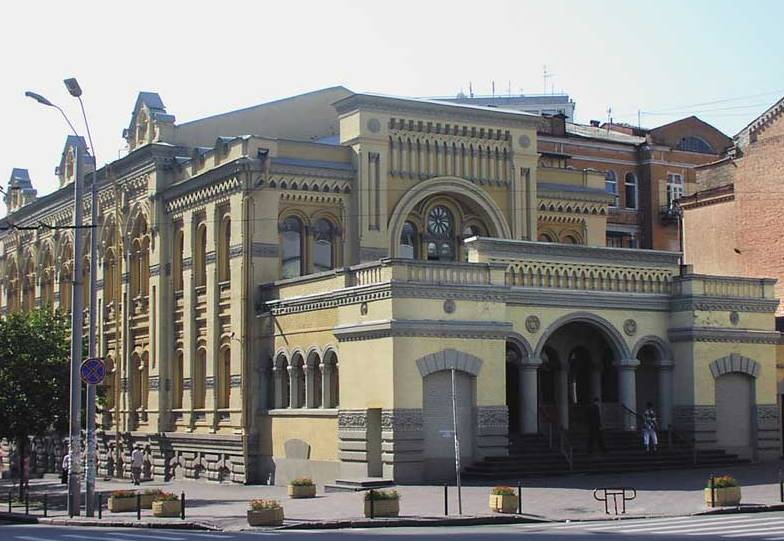

- Location in Ukraine

Religion
- Affiliation: Orthodox Judaism
- Rite: Hasidic Judaism
- Ecclesiastical or organizational status: Synagogue (1898–1926); Artisan club and theatre (1926 1997); Synagogue (since 2000)
- Leadership: Rabbi Moshe Reuven Azman
- Status: Active

Location
- Location: Kyiv
- Country: Ukraine
- Interactive map of Brodsky Synagogue
- Coordinates: 50°26′19.14″N 30°31′13.5″E

Architecture
- Architect: Georgiy Shleifer
- Type: Synagogue architecture
- Style: Romanesque Revival; Moorish Revival
- Funded by: Lazar Brodsky (1898); Vadim Rabinovich (2000)
- Completed: 1898; 2000 (restoration)

Immovable Monument of Local Significance of Ukraine
- Official name: Кафедральна синагога (Cathedral synagogue)
- Type: Architecture
- Reference no.: 3501-Кв

The Brodsky Synagogue (Ukrainian: Синагога Бродського, romanized: Synahoha Brodskoho; Yiddish: די בראדסקי שול אין קיעוו), also called the Brodsky Choral Synagogue, is an Orthodox Jewish synagogue located in Kyiv, Ukraine.

Completed in 1898 in the Romanesque Revival style resembling a classical basilica, the original tripartite façade with a large central avant-corps flanked by lower wings also echoed the characteristic design of some Moorish Revival synagogues, such as the Leopoldstädter Tempel in Vienna, Austria. It is the second largest synagogue in Kyiv.

The current rabbi of the congregation is Rabbi Moshe Reuven Azman.

== History ==
The synagogue was built between 1897 and 1898. It was designed by Georgiy Shleifer. Sugar magnate and philanthropist Lazar Brodsky financed its construction.

For many decades, the local and imperial authorities forbade the construction of a monumental place of Jewish worship in Kyiv, as they feared that this would facilitate the growth of the Jewish community in the area, which, being a big trading and industrial city, would then become an important Jewish religious center. This was considered "undesirable" due to the symbolic importance of Kyiv, as the cradle of Russian Orthodoxy. It was only allowed to convert existing buildings into Jewish worship houses.

In 1895, permission was given to build a synagogue in the Podil district, a poor quarter of Kyiv. The location was however too far from the city center where the wealthy Jews lived such that they could not walk there on Sabbath. They wished a big choral synagogue in the city center, similar to those in St. Petersburg, Moscow and Odessa.

To evade the ban, Brodsky and rabbi Evsey Tsukerman sent a complaint to the Governing Senate requesting a permission to build a worship house in the private estate of Brodsky. As an attachment they included only a side view drawing of the planned building which looked like a private mansion. The permission was obtained, and the synagogue became an example of an Aesopian synagogue.

In 1926, the synagogue was closed down by the Soviet authorities. The building was converted into an artisan club.

The building was devastated during World War II by the Nazis and was subsequently used as a puppet theatre. An additional facade was built in the 1970s.

In 1997, the theatre moved into a new building. The old building was renovated and since 2000 it is again used as a synagogue. The restoration was mainly financed by a media proprietor Vadim Rabinovich.

=== 2022 Russian Invasion ===
Since the beginning of the ongoing invasion of Ukraine by Russia, the Brodsky Synagogue has served as a point of refuge for Ukrainian refugees, as well as a main distribution point for humanitarian aid. Relief efforts have been led by Moshe Azman the head of the Brodsky Synagogue .

== Gallery ==
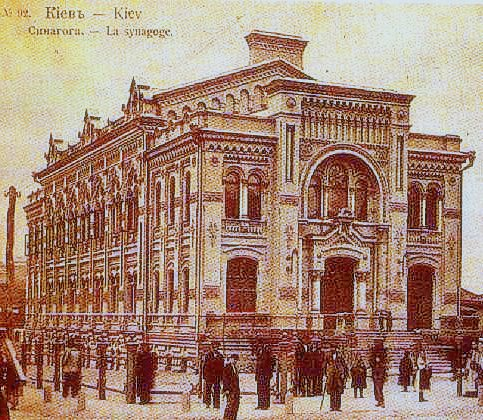
Postcard, 1909

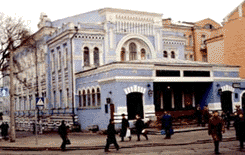
Puppet theater in the 1970s

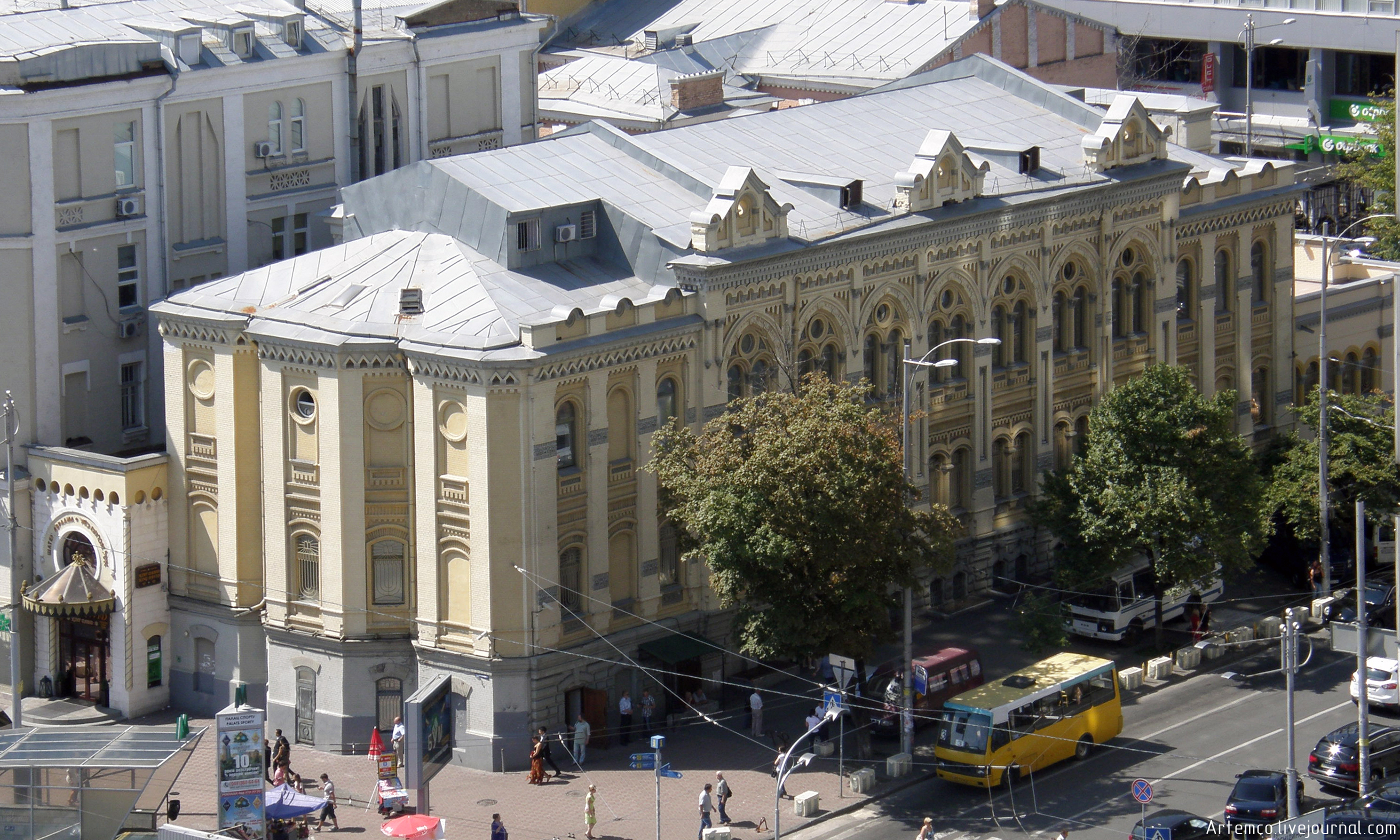
Bird's eye view today

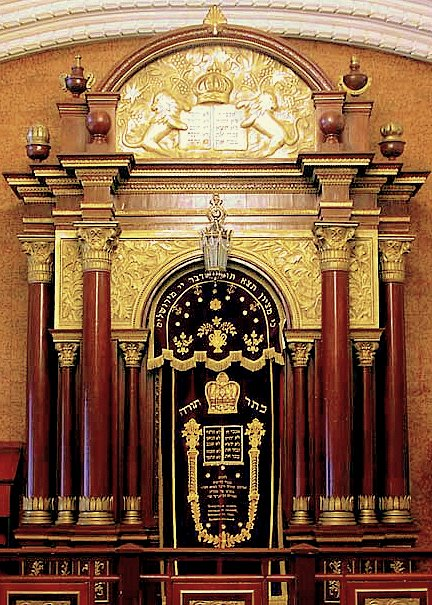
The Holy Ark of the synagogue

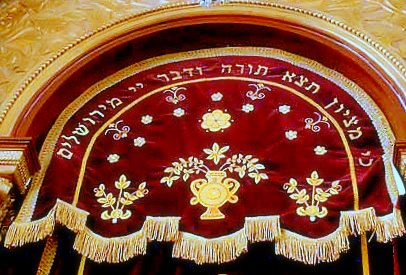
The Parochet of the Holy Ark

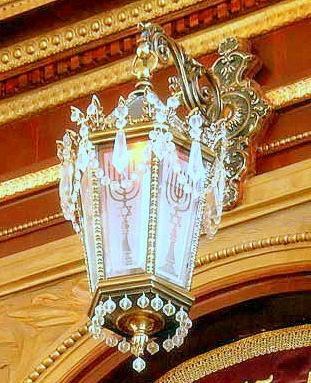
Ner tamid

== See also ==
- History of the Jews in Kyiv
- History of the Jews in Ukraine
- List of synagogues in Ukraine
