= Moshe Reuven Azman =

Chief Rabbi of Ukraine

Rabbi Moshe Reuven Azman
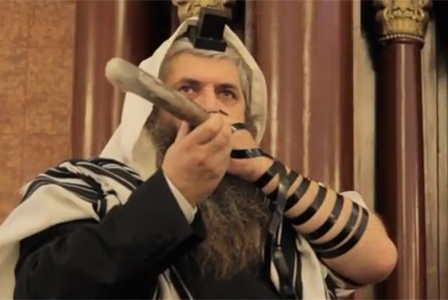
- Azman in 2014

Personal life
- Born: March 13, 1966 (age 60) Leningrad, Russian SFSR, Soviet Union
- Children: 11

Religious life
- Religion: Judaism

Jewish leader
- Position: Chief Rabbi of Ukraine
- Began: 2005

Rabbi Moshe Reuven Azman (born on 13 March 1966) is an Orthodox rabbi and one of two people who claim to be the Chief Rabbi of Ukraine.

Azman is an influential figure in Ukraine, an opponent of the Russian invasion of Ukraine in 2022, and a leader in international humanitarian aid efforts in Ukraine. He has been active on the international scene, raising awareness of the crisis in Ukraine, and strengthening Israel–Ukraine relations.

== Early life ==
Azman was born in 1966 in Leningrad, Russia. His mother's family was Chabad and his father's Litvish. He is married to the daughter of Zusya Hirsh Lyubarsky, a shochet from Kharkiv. Azman was active in the refusenik movement since his youth. In 1987, he received permission from the Soviet government to leave the USSR. He immigrated to Israel where he studied in a Chabad yeshiva. He worked as a secretary in "Beit Chabad for Russian Jews" in Israel during the Russian aliyah of 1991, helping Russian-Jewish immigrants adjust to Israel life in Israel and reconnect to Judaism. Azman also helped with bringing Ukrainian-Jewish children of Chernobyl to Israel so that they could receive medical and psychological rehabilitation.

In 1995, Azman and his wife went to Kyiv and helped a rabbi to run a synagogue in one of the rooms of the grand Brodsky Choral Synagogue, which had been turned into a puppet theater during the Soviet period. There he helped to rebuild Kyiv's Jewish community. Eventually, the Kyiv government granted the entire synagogue to the Jewish community. Azman went on to found a communal soup kitchen, a chevra Kadisha (burial service), and a kindergarten through high school education system.

== Career ==
In 2005, Azman was appointed Chief Rabbi of Ukraine by the All-Ukrainian Jewish Congress. Since his appointment, Azman has led local Jewish community events, overseen the establishment of Jewish life infrastructure including kosher food, a chevra kadisha (burial service), education, and community relations with other international Jewish organizations. He maintains close relationships with many Ukrainian leaders throughout his career and frequently visits Israel. He has met with top Israeli leaders, including Prime Minister Benjamin Netanyahu and former Jerusalem mayor Nir Barkat.

== Humanitarian work ==
Azman oversees the non-profit organization "Mitzvah for Ukraine", which provides humanitarian aid to Ukrainians of all genders, religions, and races. The organization operates two soup kitchens and distributes meal kits, oversees medical treatment, and has distributed aid shipments of clothing, generators, medical equipment, among others.

In 2022, Azman organized the delivery of 16 air conditioner units to hospitals in Ukraine for use during the warm summer months.

=== Anatevka Refugee Village ===
In 2014, in response to the 2014 Russian invasion of Ukraine that displaced hundreds of thousands of people, Azman established the Anatevka Refugee Village. The village provided housing, health care, food, and community support for hundreds of Jewish refugees. Soon after, the Mitzvah 613 Educational System was established which provided comprehensive education to both the children of Anatevka as well as Jews in other local communities.

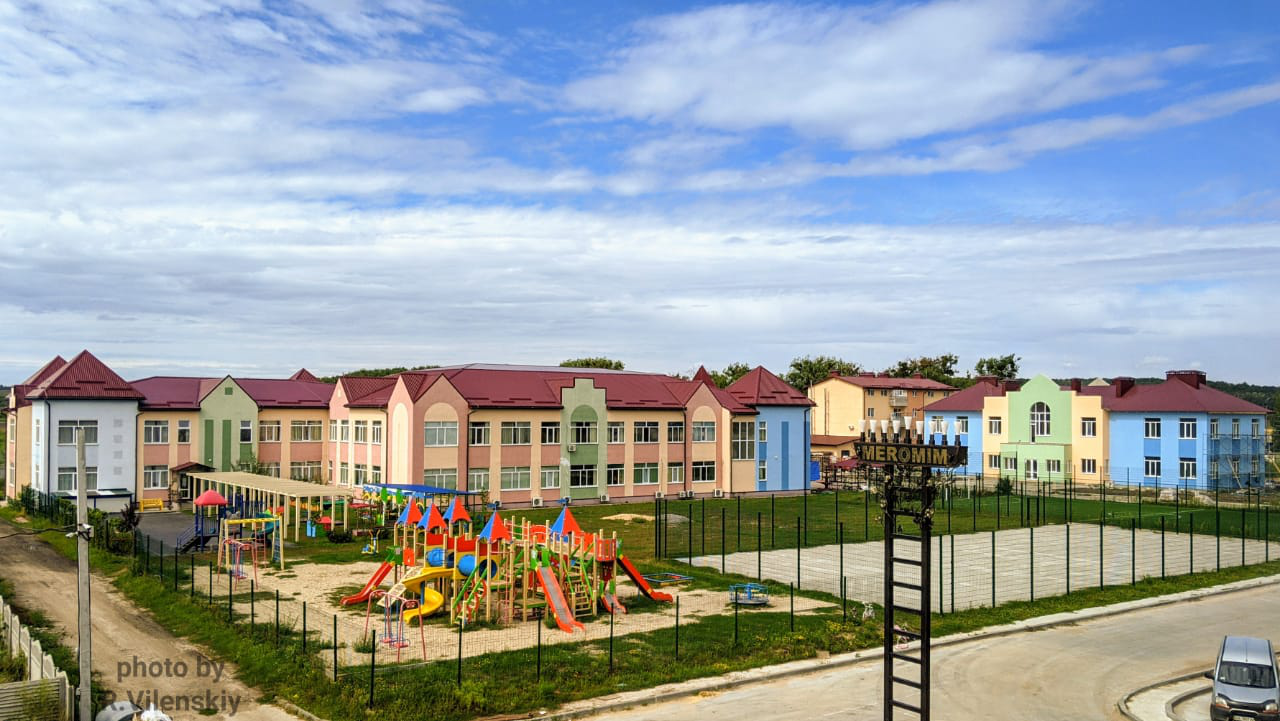
The Anatevka Refugee Village

The Village hosts a mikveh, a communal dining room, a kindergarten, a school, a soccer field, a playground, a woodworking workshop, a Cheder, a synagogue, and a hotel that is often used to house refugees before additional housing units are constructed.

=== 2022 war response ===
With the Russian Invasion of Ukraine in February 2022, Azman and his organization took a prominent role in evacuating refugees. Reports say they were responsible for the evacuation of over 40,000 individuals. He has been a strong and outspoken opponent of the war, strongly condemning the Russian invasion. He told Newsweek "I don't believe what I see. I see the Russians shooting civilian people. You make war crime, you are citizens of Russia. You are involved in the crime". He has had several viral videos in which he urged Ukrainians to resist Russian occupation. The video was seen by millions across social media.

His organization has overseen extensive aid distribution including food, clothing, medical aid, water, medical equipment, and generators. During the beginning of November, Azman coordinated with the humanitarian organization Yad Sarah to arrange shipments of surplus medical supplies to be distributed in Ukraine.

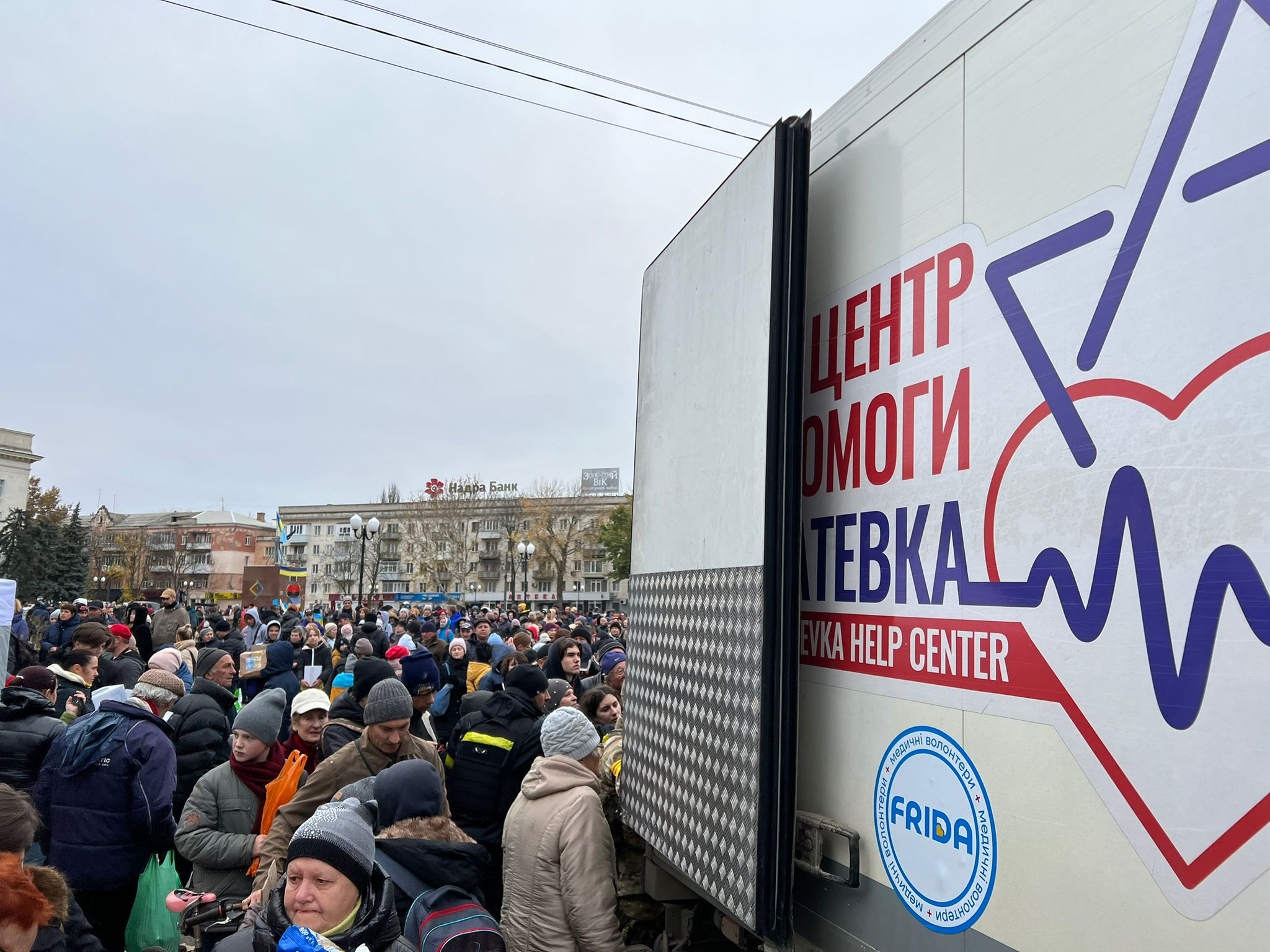
Aid distributions by Mitzvah for Ukraine in Kherson

His adopted son Matityahu (Anton) Samborsky died on 12 September 2024 while fighting for the country's military on the front line with Russia.

== International relations ==
Azman has dedicated himself to strengthening Israel-Ukraine relations. He has met several times with Prime Minister Benjamin Netanyahu to discuss the humanitarian crisis in Ukraine. Azman also received Nir Barkat in Ukraine. Barkat was the first Israeli politician to visit Ukraine since the beginning of the war. On October 28, 2022, Rabbi Azman hosted an event in collaboration with The Friends of Zion Museum. Attending were Benjamin Netanyahu, Nir Barkat, the Kosovar Ambassador to Israel and the Slovak Ambassadors to Israel.

In May 2023, Rabbi Azman visited London, where he met with former Prime Minister Boris Johnson; Chief Rabbi of the United Hebrew Congregations of the Commonwealth Ephraim Mirvis; Members of Parliament Luke Pollard, Alex Sobel, and Stephen Doughty; and John Alderdice, Baron Alderdice. They discussed the importance of Ukrainian-British solidarity and the implementation of Israeli technology in Ukraine, including water purification systems.
