= Azriel Chaikin =

Former Chief Rabbi of Ukraine

- Azriel Haikin praying in 770 Eastern Parkway synagogue in 2017
- Born: 1931 (age 94–95); Georgia USSR
- Occupations: Chief Rabbi, Chabad movement in Ukraine and recognized halakhic authority
- Title: Chief Rabbi of Ukraine

Azriel Chaikin (Hebrew עזריאל חייקין; born 1931 in USSR) is a former Chief Rabbi of Ukraine. In 2003, he was proclaimed by all the Ukrainian Jewish communities as the Chief Rabbi of Ukraine.

== Life ==
Rabbi Chaikin was born in the Georgian Soviet Socialist Republic in 1931, where his father, Meir Chaim Chaikin, had served as an emissary of the sixth Rebbe, Rabbi Yosef Yitzchak Schneersohn.

In 1955, Chaikin went on shlichus to Morocco and served as the head of the Chabad Yeshiva in Agadir. Due to the teaching of Hebrew in schools under his auspices, he was accused of being a Zionist. This led him to leave Morocco and relocate to France. He subsequently moved to Denmark, where he established a Chabad yeshiva.

In 1968, Rabbi Chaikin accepted a rabbinic position in Brussels, Belgium. As a result of this position, he became an influential rabbinic figure in Europe. He served as Chief Rabbi of Ukraine until 2008, when he asked Rabbi Jonathan Markovitch to succeed him; subsequently, he moved to the Crown Heights neighborhood of Brooklyn.
