= Bilohorodka, Kyiv Oblast =

Rural locality in Kyiv Oblast, Ukraine

Bilohorodka Білогородка
- Village
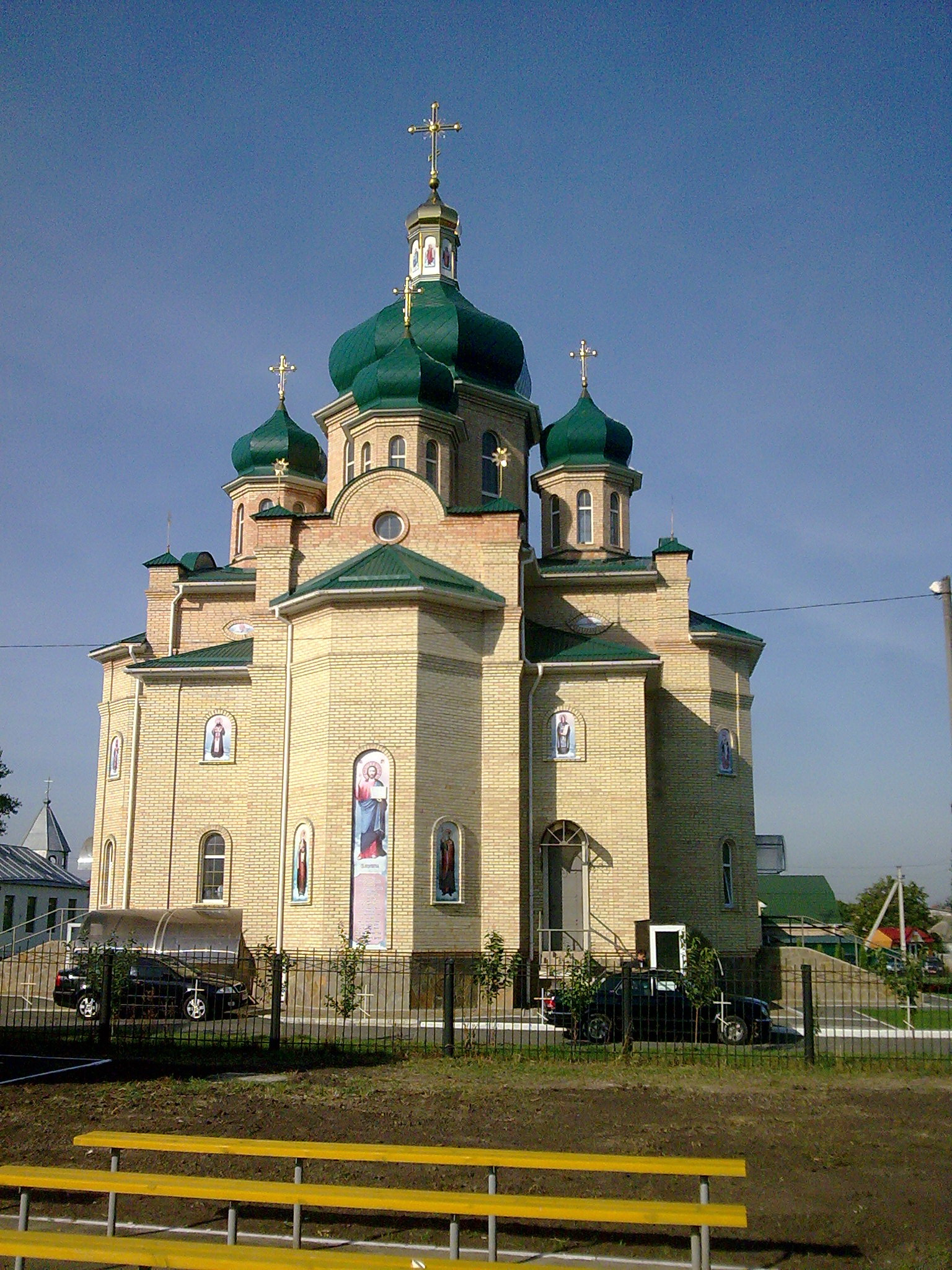

- Flag Coat of arms

- Location within Ukraine Location within Kyiv Oblast
- Coordinates: 50°23′39″N 30°13′53″E
- Country: Ukraine
- Oblast: Kyiv Oblast
- Raion: Bucha Raion
- Hromada: Bilohorodka rural hromada
- Founded: 980 A.D.
- Village council: Bilohorodka Village Council
- Area: 55 km^{2} (21 sq mi)
- Elevation: 152 m (499 ft)
- Population (2023): 27.000
  - Density: 1.067/km^{2} (2.76/sq mi)
- Time zone: UTC+2 (EET)
  - Summer (DST): UTC+3 (EEST)
- Postal code: 08140
- Area code: +380 4598

Bilohorodka (Ukrainian: Білогородка) is a village in Bucha Raion, Kyiv Oblast of north Ukraine. It hosts the administration of Bilohorodka rural hromada, one of the hromadas of Ukraine, formed on 12 June 12 2020 and including nine neighbouring villages: Bobrytsia, Horenytsia, Myzychi, Sviatopetrivske, Hnativka, Stoianka, Shevchenko, Nehrashi, and Luka.

One of the community's nine component villages, Hnativka, is perhaps better known by its Hebrew and Yiddish name Anatevka, and is the site of a modern-day refugee village which was named after the fictional town of Anatevka from the Sholem Aleichem stories, including Fiddler on the Roof, stories which were set in this same area of the former Kiev Governorate.

== History ==
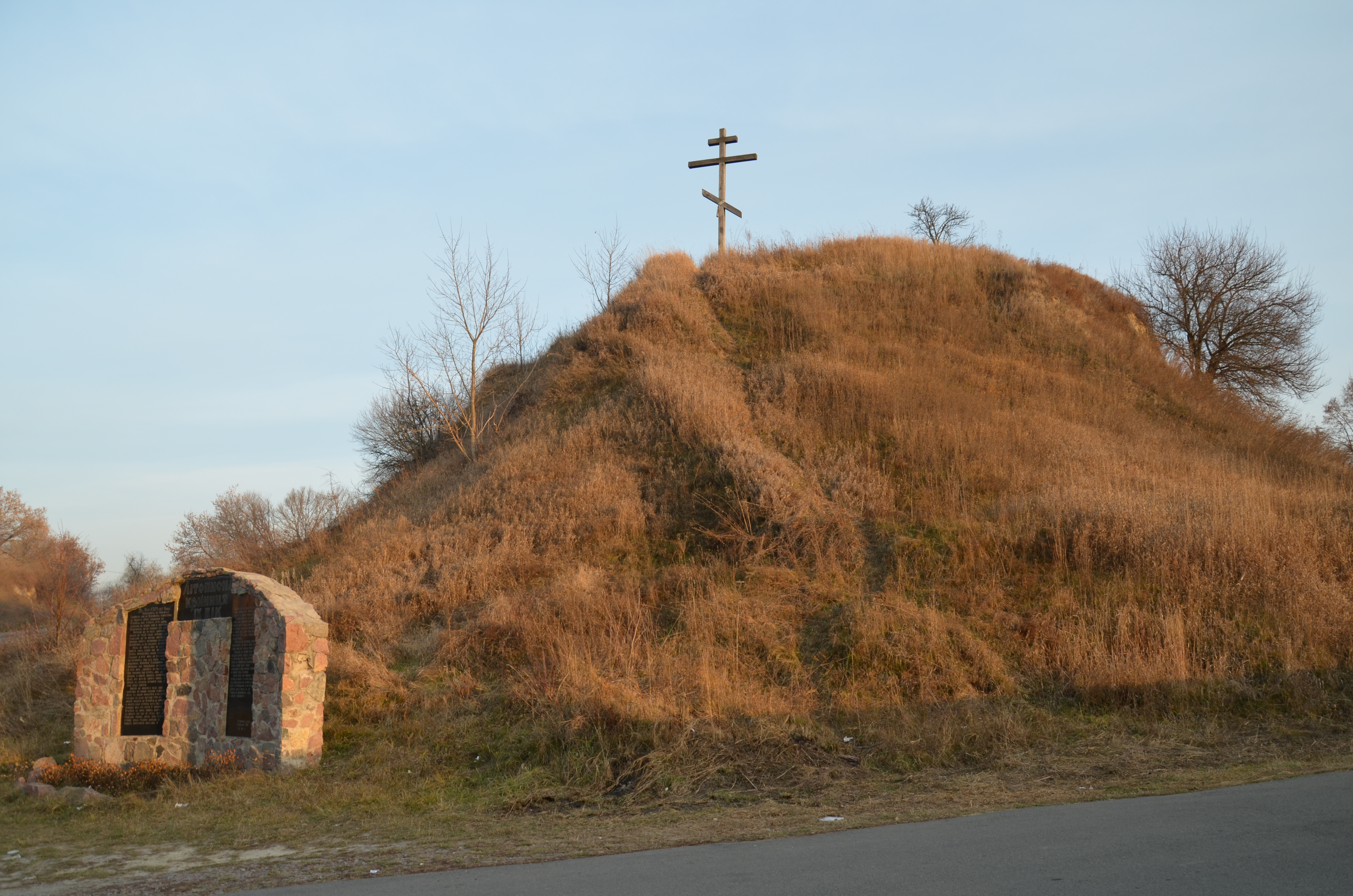
Remains of Bilhorod Castle in the modern village of Bilohorodka

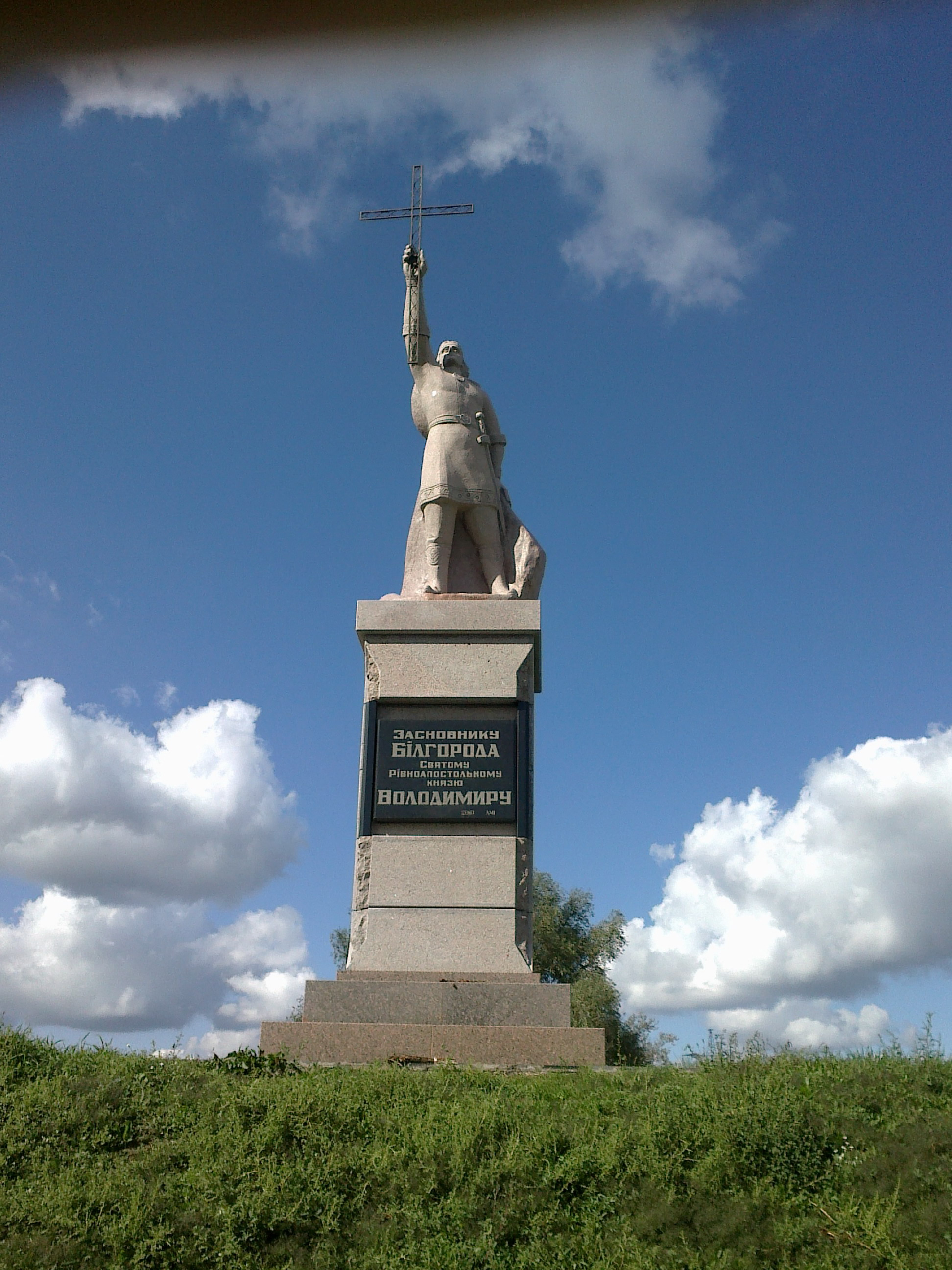
Volodymyr the Great Monument of Bilohorodka

The village was established in 980 as the legendary city-castle Bilhorod Kyivskyi, located in Kyivan Rus'. It was located on the right bank of Irpin River and was mentioned in chronicles.

In 1909–1910 excavations on the site of the old fortress were performed by Vikentiy Khvoyka, who discovered a defensive wall made of brick and three stories of clay-filled wooden structures. The remains of fortifications were later studied by Natalia Polonska-Vasylenko.

In February 1918, following the evacuation of Kyiv by the Central Rada, the Separate Zaporozhian Detachment of the Ukrainian People's Army was established in the village of Hnativka. On 29 August 1919 the area became the site of a battle, during which the 6th (Rava) Brigade of the Ukrainian Galician Army defeated Bolshevik troops.

Until 18 July 2020, Bilohorodka belonged to Kyiv-Sviatoshyn Raion. The raion was abolished that day as part of the administrative reform of Ukraine, which reduced the number of raions of Kyiv Oblast to seven. The area of Kyiv-Sviatoshyn Raion was split between Bucha, Fastiv, and Obukhiv raions, with Bilohorodka being transferred to Bucha Raion.

== Geography ==
The village lies at an altitude of 152 metres and covers an area of 55 km^{²}. It has a population of about 12000 people (2022).
