= Horenychi =

Rural locality in Kyiv Oblast, Ukraine

Coordinates: 50°25′N 30°12′E

Horenychi (Ukrainian: Гореничі) is a village in Ukraine, in Bucha Raion (district) of Kyiv Oblast. It belongs to Bilohorodka rural hromada, one of the hromadas of Ukraine. The village has a population of 2,551.

Until 18 July 2020, Horenychi belonged to Kyiv-Sviatoshyn Raion. The raion was abolished that day as part of the administrative reform of Ukraine, which reduced the number of raions of Kyiv Oblast to seven. The area of Kyiv-Sviatoshyn Raion was split between Bucha, Fastiv, and Obukhiv Raions, with Horenychi being transferred to Bucha Raion.
