= Yaakov Bleich =

Chief Rabbi of Ukraine

Rabbi Yaakov Dov Bleich
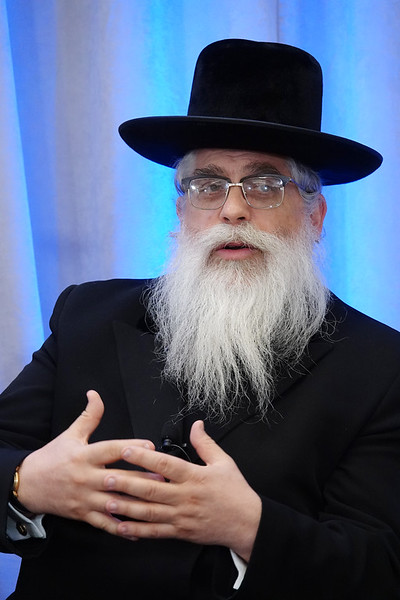
- Bleich in 2023

Personal life
- Born: October 19, 1964 (age 62) Brooklyn, New York, United States
- Children: 7
- Education: Telshe Yeshiva (Chicago)

Religious life
- Religion: Judaism
- Denomination: Hasidic Judaism

Jewish leader
- Position: Chief Rabbi of Podil synagogue
- Synagogue: Great Choral Synagogue
- Organisation: Union of Jewish Religious Organizations of Ukraine
- Began: 1990
- Residence: Monsey, New York

Yaakov Dov Bleich (born October 19, 1964) is an American-born rabbi. He serves as Rabbi of the Kyiv synagogue in Podil since 1989. Rabbi Bleich was vice-president of the World Jewish Congress from 2009 to 2017. Bleich chose not to run for re-election as a member of the WJC Executive Committee at the WJC’s May 2021 plenary assembly. He is one of two rabbis who claim the title of Chief Rabbi of Ukraine.

== Biography ==
Bleich graduated from Telshe Yeshiva High School in Chicago, Illinois where he began his rabbinical studies. From 1984 to 1986, he studied at the Karlin Stolin Rabbinical Institute in Jerusalem.

In November 2014, Bleich strongly criticized Minister of the Interior Arsen Avakov for appointing Vadym Troyan, a former Azov Battalion commander, to the post of police chief of the Kyiv Oblast. Speaking to The Jerusalem Post, Bleich stated that "if the interior minister continues to appoint people of questionable repute and ideologies tainted with fascism and right-wing extremism, the interior minister should be replaced".

In 2018, he was expelled from his own community, but continued to publicly call himself chief rabbi; another Jewish leader of Ukraine, Michael Tkach, accused Bleich of being an impostor. Subsequently, despite the announced herem, he returned to the synagogue; according to Israeli journalist Shimon Briman, everything that is happening is a struggle for influence between Jewish leaders.

In 2019, Bleich, together with Sviatoslav Shevchuk (Ukrainian Greek Catholic Church) and Epiphanius of Kyiv (Orthodox Church of Ukraine), held a prayer service for members of the Organization of Ukrainian Nationalists in the Jewish cemetery of Sambir.

On February 27, 2022, Bleich told Arutz Sheva: "President Zelensky called my community a few hours ago, while waging war, and asked the Jewish people should pray for Ukraine. 'The Russians have more soldiers than us, but our soldiers have more determination than the Russians. We need your prayers for us to succeed, the Ukrainian president said."

In May 2022, the Board of Deputies of British Jews decided to break ties with the European Jewish Congress following the latter's "unsatisfactory" reaction to allegations of sexual misconduct by Rabbi Yaakov Bleich.

He supports the law banning the activities of the UOC (MP) in Ukraine.
