= History of the Jews in Kyiv =

The history of the Jews in Kyiv stretches from the 10th century CE to the 21st century, and forms part of the history of the Jews in Ukraine.

== Middle Ages and Renaissance ==
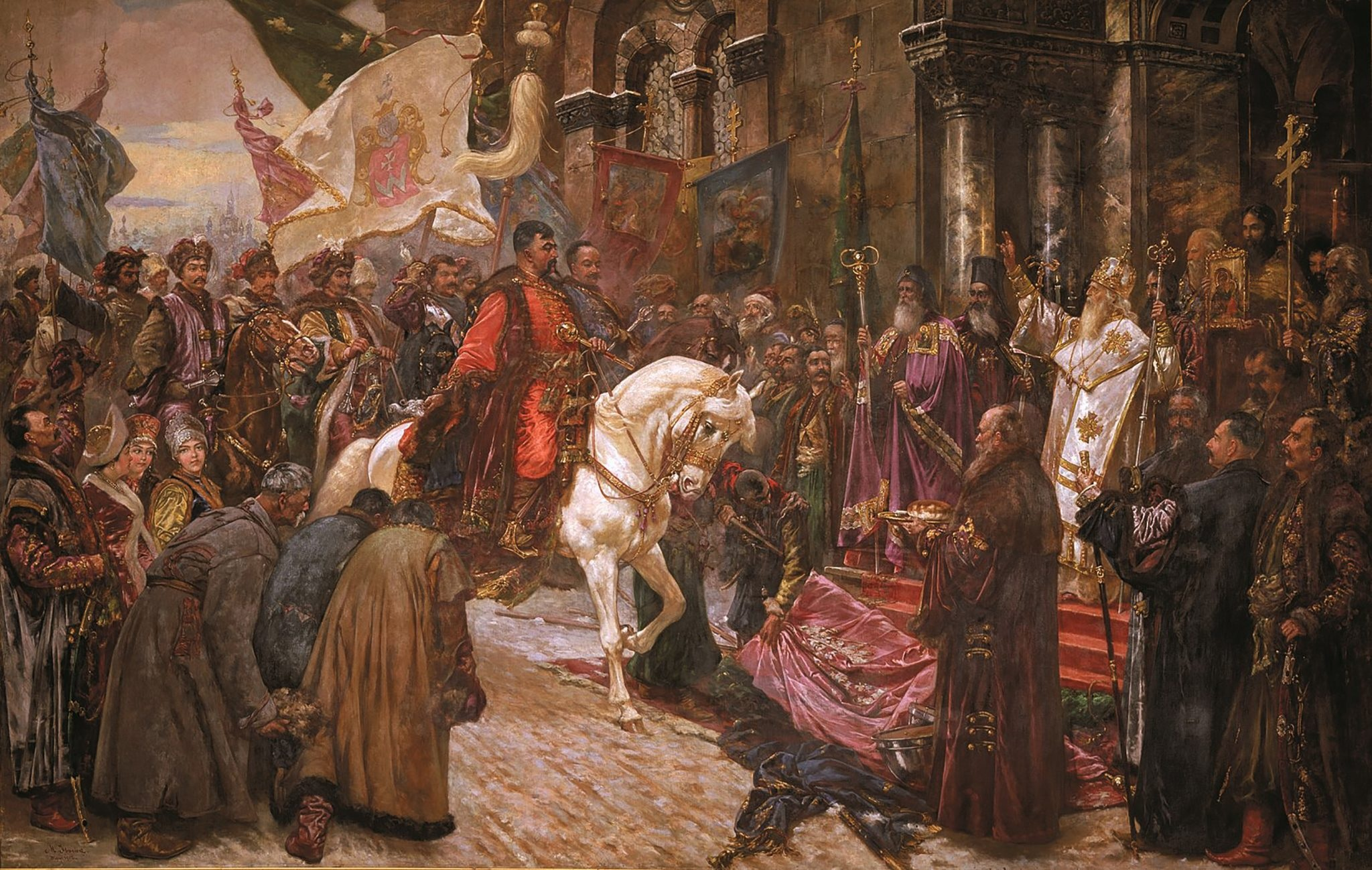
Bohdan Khmelnytsky Entering Kyiv by Mykola Ivasyuk.

The first mention of Jews in Kyiv is found in the 10th century Kievian Letter, written by Jews from Cairo in ancient Hebrew. It is the oldest written document to mention the name of the city. Jewish travelers such as Benjamin of Tudela and Pethahiah of Regensburg mentioned the city as one with a large Jewish community. During the Mongol occupation the community was devastated, together with the rest of the city, but the community revived with the acquisition of the city by the Polish–Lithuanian Commonwealth. During Polish–Lithuanian rule, Jews were allowed to settle in the city, but they were subject to several deportations in 1495 and again in 1619.

During the Khmelnytsky Uprising in 1648 most of the Jews in the city were murdered by Zaporozhian Cossacks, along with most of the Jews in Ukraine. After the Russian occupation in 1654, Jews were not allowed to settle in the city. This ban was lifted only in 1793 after the Third Partition of Poland.

== 19th and early 20th century ==
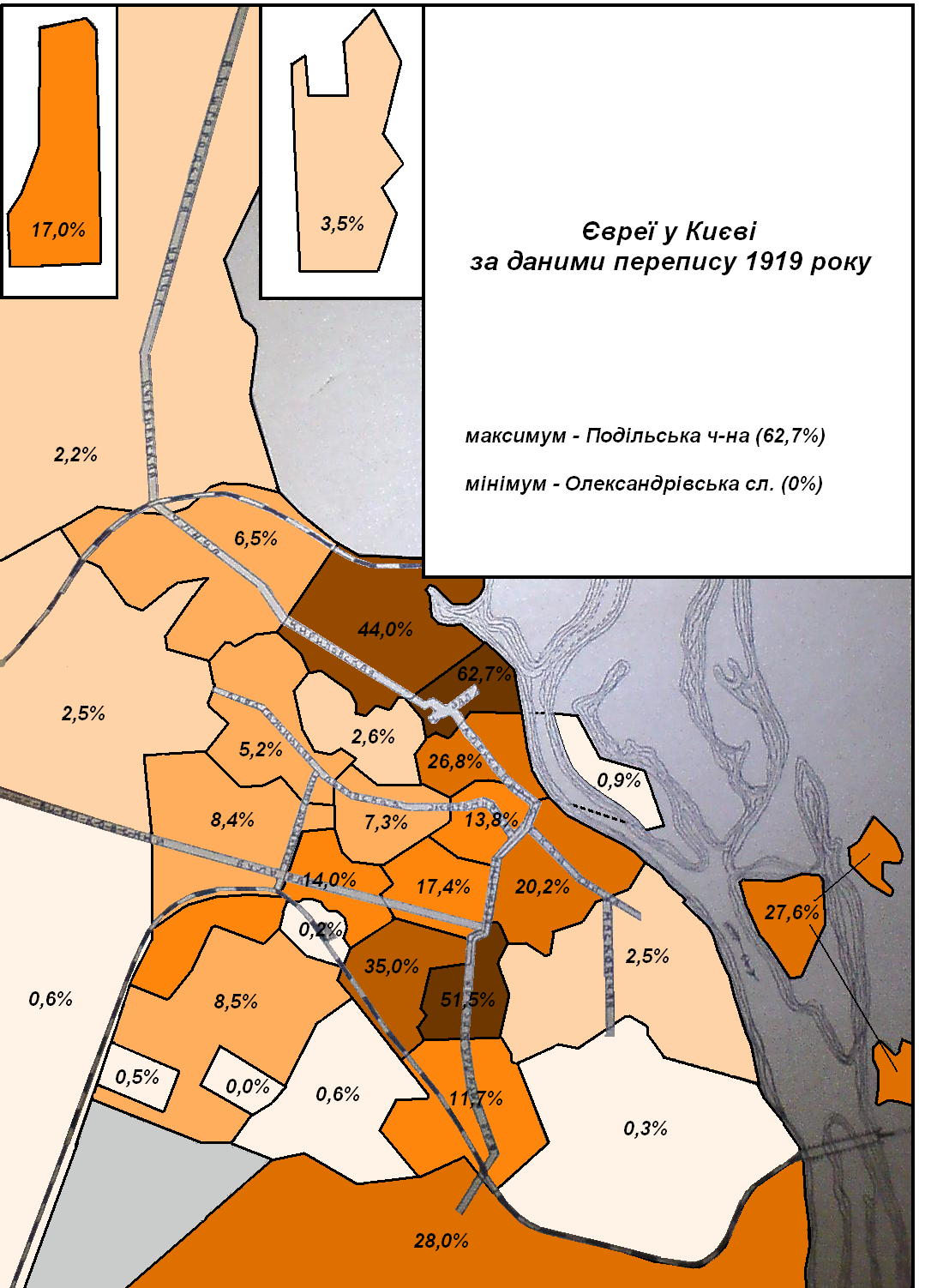
Percentage of ethnic Jews in Kyiv's districts according to the 1919 municipal population census

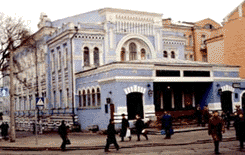
Brodsky Choral Synagogue around 1970; then used as a puppet theatre and currently used as a synagogue

Starting from the last decade of the 18th century the Jewish population of Kyiv grew significantly, rising from around 100 in 1795 to almost 700 in 1801. This process was contributed by the establishment of the region's largest trading fair, which moved to Kyiv from Dubno in 1797. In 1815, the Jewish population was 1,500 However, in 1827 the city's Jews were once again forced out after a petition issued by merchants to the government. Jews were readmitted to Kyiv after the accession of Alexander II to the throne in 1855, and in the following decades their population in the city grew from around 3,000 in 1863 to 14,000 in 1872 and 32,000 in 1897 (13% of the total population). Reaching a number of over 81,000 in 1913, Kyiv's Jews became one of the biggest Jewish communities in Ukraine.

Most of the city's Jews engaged in trade, crafts and carting, and tended to settle in the poorest neighbourhoods. However, some of the Jews living in Kyiv during that time belonged to the social elite and played an important role in the city's government and economy, and a Jewish middle class consisting of educated specialists such as lawyers, doctors and engineers also emerged. In that period many synagogues were built including Kyiv's main synagogue, the Brodsky Choral Synagogue. Jewish schools and workshops were built all around the city. At the same time, the community suffered from a number of pogroms in 1881, and again in 1905, when hundreds of Jews were murdered and wounded. The Beilis trial, in which a local Jew, Beilis, was accused of the ritual murder of a child, took place in the city in 1913. Beilis was found innocent.

== After the Revolution of 1917 ==
Following the outbreak of World War I and the Russian Revolution, millions of Jews found refuge in the city fleeing from conflict zones. Jews living in Kyiv were granted national autonomy by the Ukrainian authorities, and Jewish political parties played an important role in the country's government. However, this didn't prevent a new wave of pogroms during the Ukrainian War of Independence, when the city switched hands several times. After the establishment of the Ukrainian SSR the Jewish population grew rapidly and reached approximately 224,000 people in 1939.

At the beginning of the Nazi invasion of the Soviet Union most Jews escaped from the city. The remaining 33,771 Jews were concentrated in Babyn Yar, and were executed by shooting on September 29-30th 1941, in an act that became one of the most notorious episodes of the Holocaust. Another 15,000 Jews were murdered in the same place during 1941–1942.

After the war, the surviving Jews returned to the city. On September 4–7, 1945 a pogrom took place and around one hundred Jews were beaten, of whom thirty-six were hospitalized and five died of wounds.

In 1946, there was only one operating synagogue in Kyiv. The last rabbi to officiate in Kyiv was Rabbi Panets, who retired in 1960 and died in 1968; a new rabbi was not appointed. After the collapse of the Soviet Union in 1991, most of the Jewish population emigrated from Kyiv. After Ukrainian independence, there was a revival of Jewish community life, with the establishment of two Jewish schools and a memorial in Babyn Yar, where an official ceremony is held every year.

Today there are approximately 40,000 Jews in Kyiv, with two major religious communities: Chabad in both the city center and in the Padol neighborhood, and Karlin. Two major synagogues, the Brodsky Choral Synagogue and the Great Choral Synagogue, serve these communities. The Chief Rabbi of Kyiv, Rabbi Jonathan Markovitch, a key figure in the Chabad community, has led efforts to strengthen Jewish life in the city since 2000, overseeing religious, educational, and humanitarian initiatives.

=== Antisemitism ===
Kyiv Rabbi Jonathan Markovitch chose to move his daughter's wedding to Israel, fearing that the guests would be victimized in the chaos during the Ukrainian revolution of 2014. The pro-Russian Ukrainians and the Ukraine-government supporters blamed each other for the exacting situation of the Jews of Kyiv, but the leaders of Ukraine's Jewish community judged that recent anti-Semitic provocations in the Crimea, including graffiti on a synagogue in Crimea's capital that read “Death to the Zhids,” were the handiwork of pro-Russian Ukrainians. Rabbi Yaakov Dov Bleich, who presides over Ukraine's Jewish Federation, signed a letter asking Russia to end its aggression, and compared the current climate in Crimea to that of pre-Anschluss Austria.

== Culture ==
Kultur-Lige (Yiddish for Cultural League), which was founded in Kyiv in early 1918 during the period of Central Rada, promoted the development of Yiddish culture and education with the support of the Ukrainian Ministry of Jewish Affairs and a number of Jewish political parties. Among its prominent members were notable cultural and political figures such as David Bergelson, Moishe Zilberfarb, Dovid Hofshteyn, Perets Markish, Nochum Shtif, Zelig Kalmanovich, A. Litvak, Jacob Lestschinsky, El Lissitzky Boris Aronson and others. Under the rule of hetman Pavlo Skoropadsky the League de facto played the role of an organ of Jewish autonomy in Ukraine, and its branches existed in almost 100 Ukrainian towns and shtetls. Organizations modeled on the Kultur-Lige soon emerged in various regions of the former Russian Empire, as well as in Poland, Romania, Germany, France, United States and Latin America. After the establishment of Bolshevik rule over Ukraine the League was subjected to Communist authorities and gradually ceased its activities.

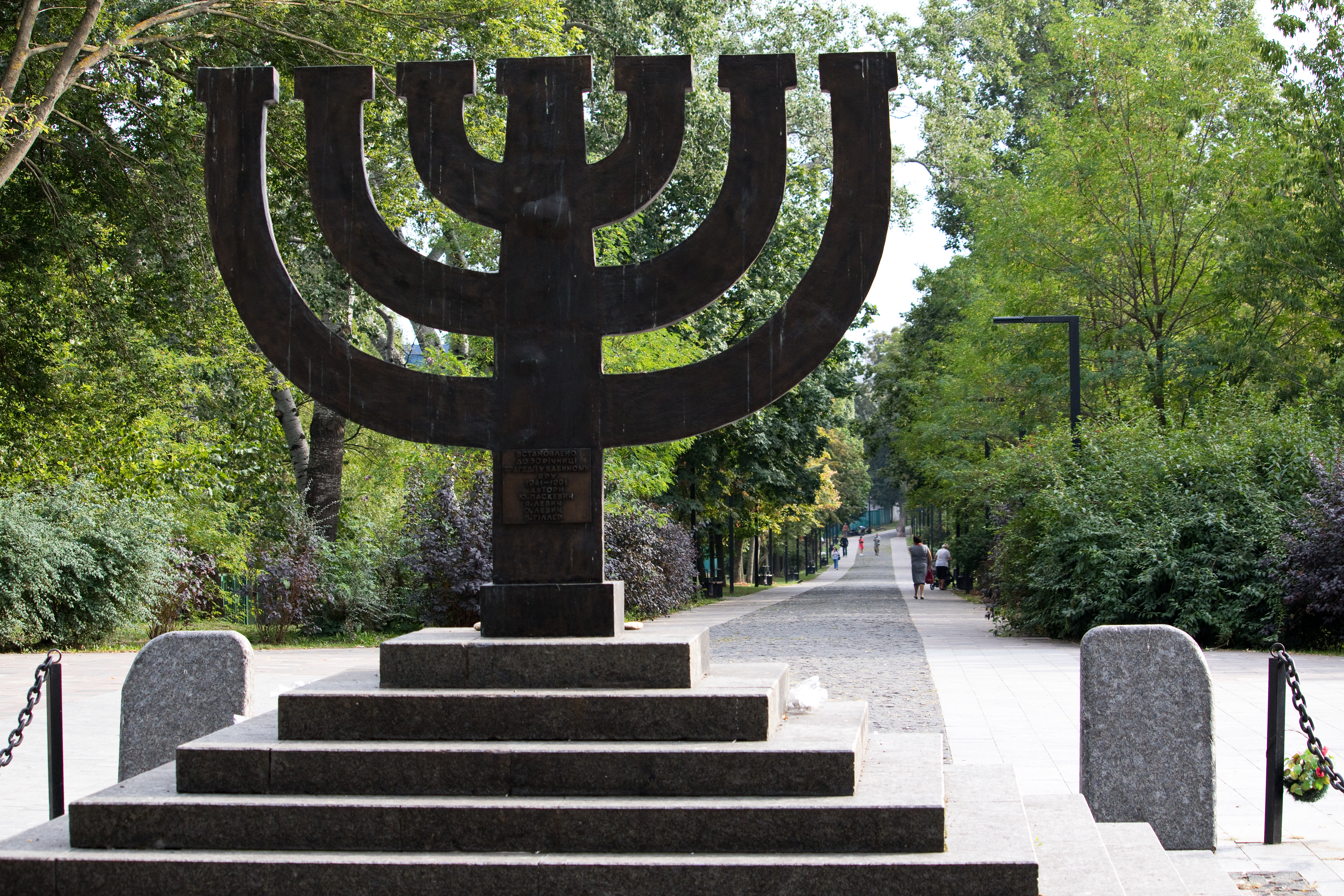
Menorah monument in Babi Yar

Kyiv remained a prominent center of Jewish culture during the early decades of Soviet rule, although the nature of that culture was mostly "proletarian". A State Jewish Theater was founded in the city, and numerous publications in Yiddish were printed with government support. The situation changed with World War II, during which much of Kyiv's Jewish population fled or perished. The surviving and returning Jews suffered from the "anticosmopolitan campaign" initiated by Soviet government in the postwar years, and the city's organized Jewish activity was limited to only one synagogue and a number of Yiddish circles. Jewish cultural life in Kyiv during the later Soviet period was often focused on the memory of Babi Yar. Despite the significant decline in the number of Jews in the postwar years and especially since the fall of the Soviet Union in 1991, Kyiv is currently home to four active synagogues and a number of Jewish cultural institutions and organizations, including the Institute of Judaica, an Israel Cultural Center, a Jewish theater as well as numerous festivals.

== See also ==
- Yehupetz
- History of the Jews in Brody
- History of the Jews in Chernivtsi
- History of the Jews in Kharkiv
- History of the Jews in Odesa
- History of the Jews in Russia
- History of the Jews in the Soviet Union
