= Great Choral Synagogue (Kyiv) =

Synagogue in Kyiv, Ukraine

- Ukrainian: Велика хоральна синагога Києва
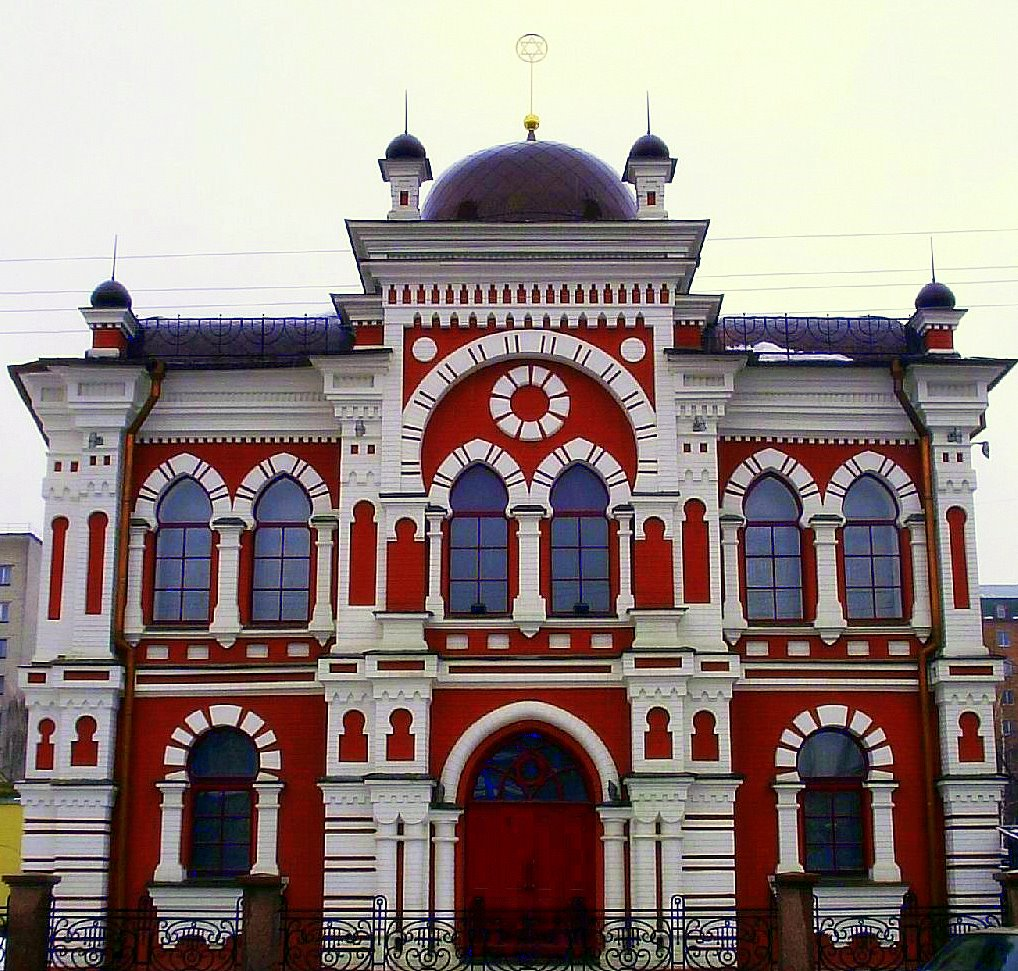
- Great Choral Synagogue, in 2008

- Location of the synagogue in Ukraine

Religion
- Affiliation: Orthodox Judaism
- Ecclesiastical or organizational status: Synagogue (1895–1920); Stables (1930s–1940s); Synagogue (since 1945)
- Leadership: Rabbi Yaakov Bleich
- Status: Active

Location
- Location: Schekovytska 29, Podil, Kyiv
- Country: Ukraine
- Interactive map of Great Choral Synagogue
- Coordinates: 50°28′13″N 30°30′43″E

Architecture
- Architects: Nikolay Gardenin (1895); Valerian Rykov (1915)
- Type: Synagogue architecture
- Style: Moorish Revival
- Funded by: Gabriel Yakob Rozenberg (1895); Vladimir Ginzburg (1915)
- Completed: 1895

Specifications
- Dome: One
- Minaret: Four

The Great Choral Synagogue of Kyiv (Ukrainian: Велика хоральна синагога Києва), also known as the Podil Synagogue or the Rozenberg Synagogue, is a Aesopian synagogue, located in Podil, a historic neighborhood of Kyiv, Ukraine. Built in 1895, it is under the leadership of Rabbi Yaakov Dov Bleich Chief Rabbi of Kyiv and Ukraine since 1990.

== History ==
In 1891, Kyiv had 12 Jewish prayer houses but no large synagogues. In July 1893, the Minister of Interior stated 'Jews are not allowed to construct a choral prayer house in either central part of Kiev or in its remote places'.

The Great Choral Synagogue of Kyiv, an Aesopian synagogue located at 29 Schekovytska Street, was originally a residential house which Hessel Rozenberg received a construction permit for in 1894. His son, Gabriel Jacob Rozenberg, got permission to move a house of prayer to the building and it was officially opened in 1895. Nikolay Gordenin, a local architect, designed the building. In 1915, the building was reconstructed by architect Valerian Rykov and expanded with elements in the Moorish Revival style. The reconstruction was financed by Vladimir Ginzburg.

In 1929, the synagogue was closed by Soviet authorities. During the German occupation of Kyiv in World War II, the Nazis converted the building into a horse stable amongst other things. Since 1945, the building has been used as a synagogue. Reportedly, in 1952, 12,000 people visited the synagogue during the autumn holidays.

In 1990, restoration works were launched under the leadership of the new and self-proclaimed Chief Rabbi of Kyiv and Ukraine, Yaakov Dov Bleich. A yeshiva and schools for boys and girls were also established. In the early 2000s, the Great Choral Synagogue underwent further restoration work. It reopened on the 4th of March 2003. Edward Shifrin was the principal sponsor of the work.

The synagogue was closed in 2014 due to the 2014 Russo-Ukrainian War. On the 24th of September 2014, one day before Rosh Hashanah, a firebomb was thrown at the synagogue, but there was no significant damage.

== Gallery ==
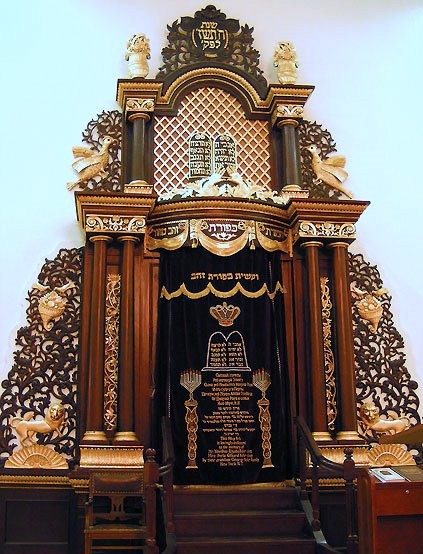
The Holy Ark of the synagogue

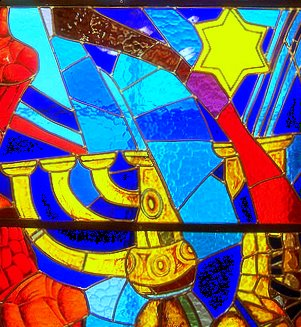
A stained glass window

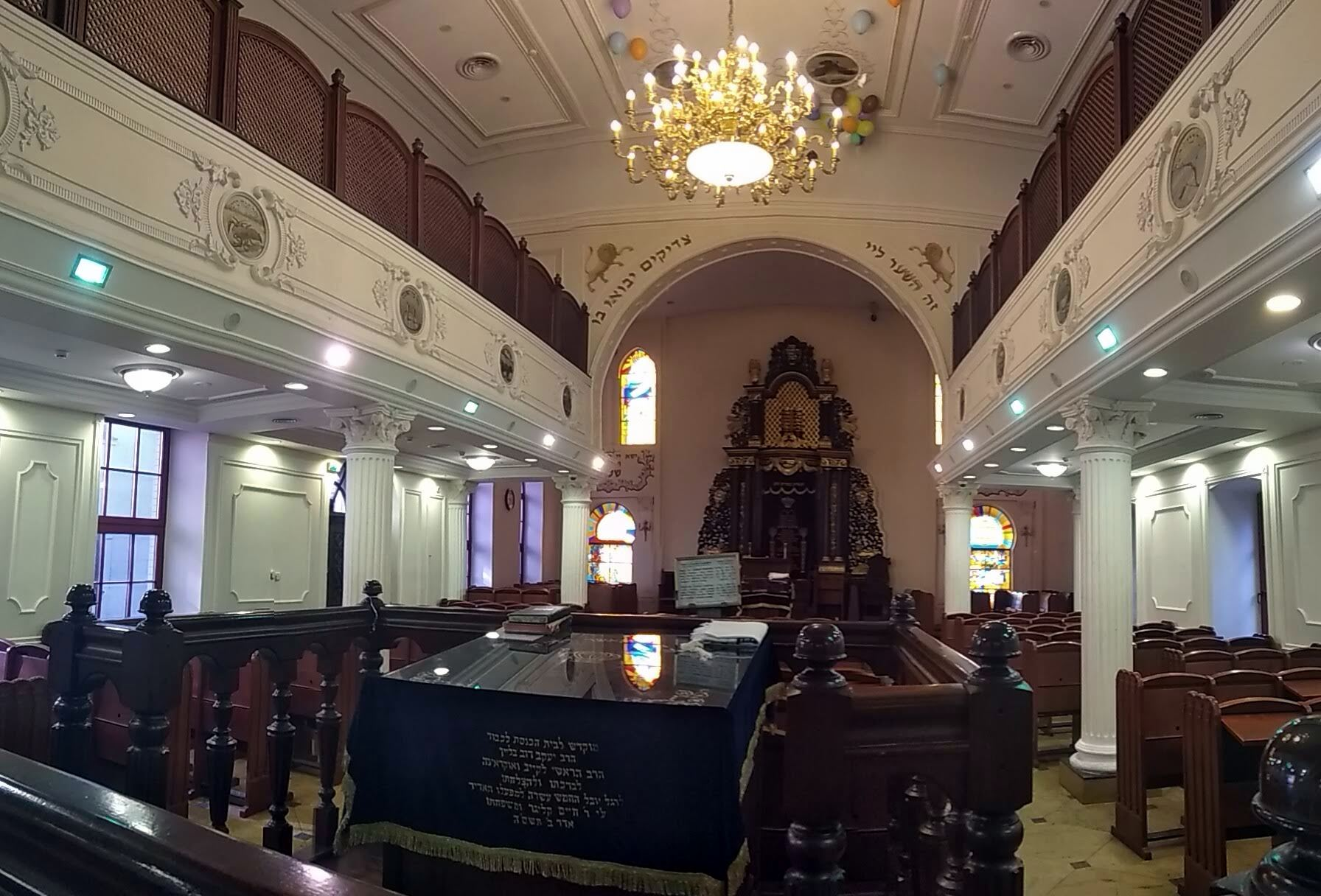
Interior

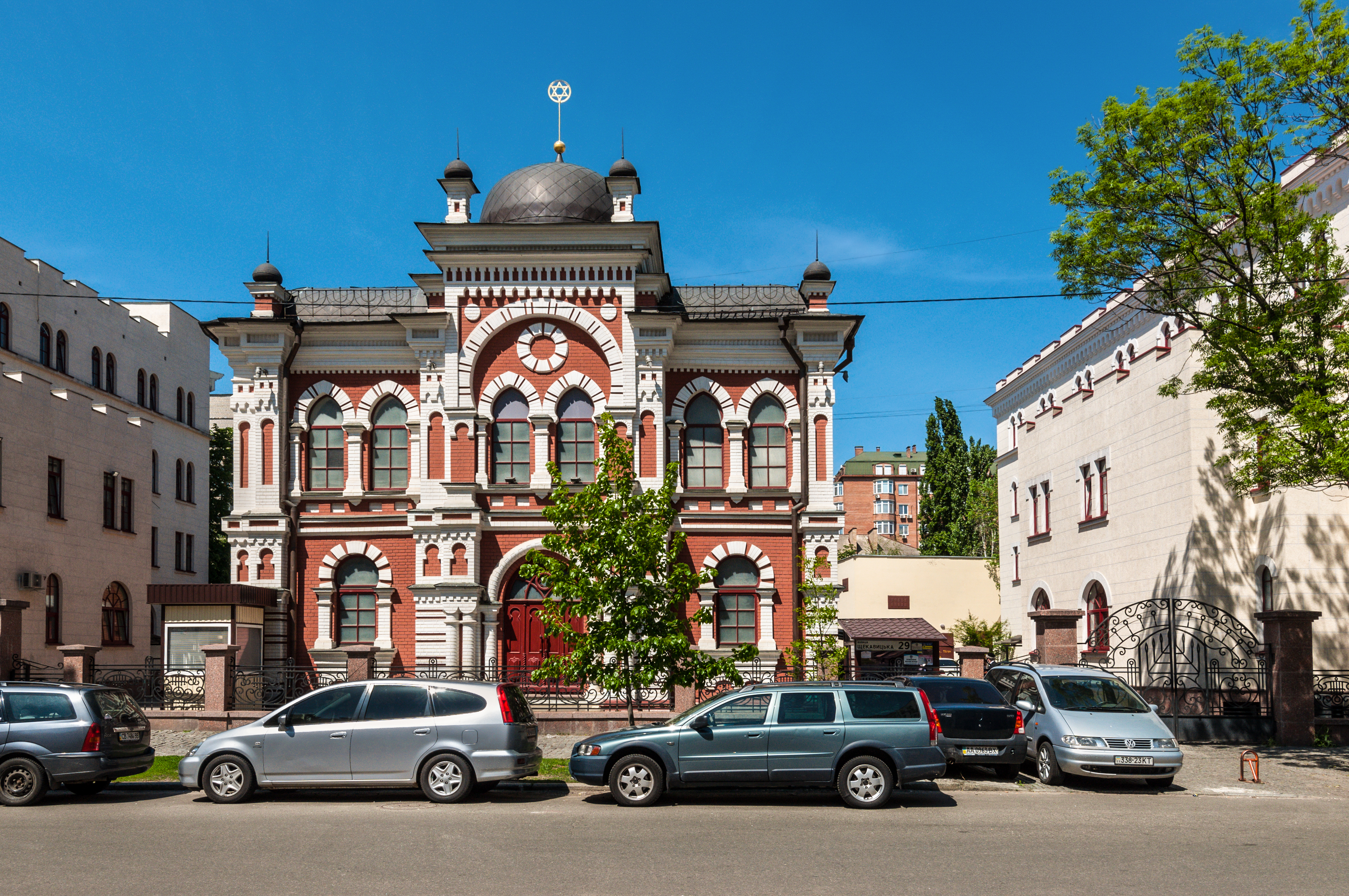
Outside

== See also ==
- History of the Jews in Kyiv
- History of the Jews in Ukraine
- List of synagogues in Ukraine
