= Chief Rabbi of Ukraine =

Leader of Ukrainian Jewish community

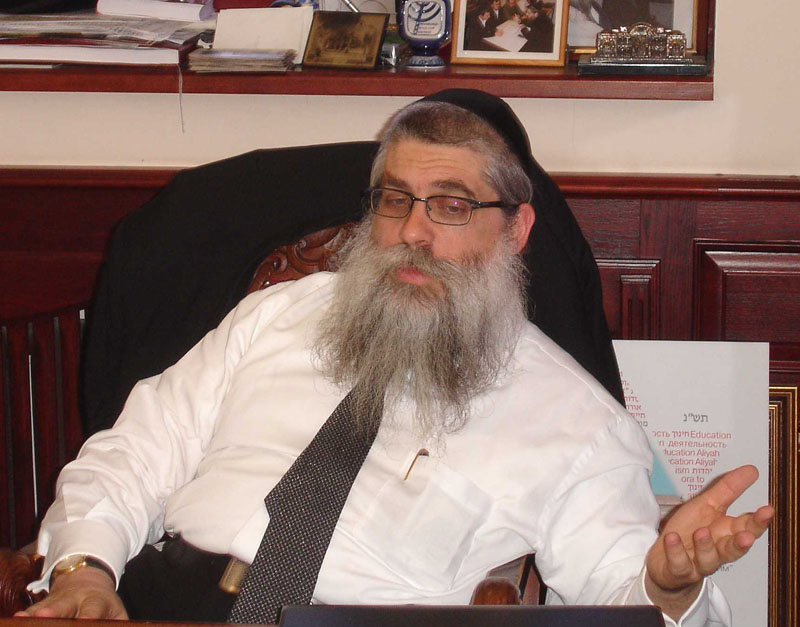
Rabbi Yaakov Dov Bleich in 2012

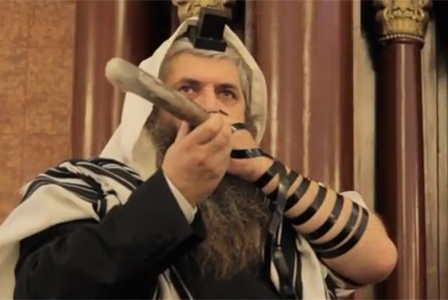
Rabbi Moshe Reuven Azman in 2014

The Chief Rabbi of Ukraine is the leader of the Jewish community in Ukraine. Since 2005, this position has been claimed by Rabbi Moshe Reuven Azman and Rabbi Yaakov Bleich.

== History ==
The Forward and The Jerusalem Post report that although Rabbi Yaakov Bleich had "never [been] properly elected", he had been broadly acknowledged as Kyiv's and Ukraine's chief rabbi since 1992. However, in 2003, Chabad-Lubavitch rabbis elected Rabbi Azriel Chaikin to the position of chief rabbi, leading to confusion. Chaikin resigned his post and moved to New York in 2008 and has not lived in Ukraine since then.

In 2005, a third chief rabbi emerged when Rabbi Moshe Reuven Azman—also a Chabad rabbi but not a member of the Federation of Jewish Communities of Ukraine—was elected by the All-Ukrainian Jewish Congress and the United Jewish Community of Ukraine, in a move rejected by other Chabad leaders.

Bleich did not relinquish his title, and as of 2022, media quoted and referred to both Azman and Bleich as chief rabbi of Ukraine.
