= Aesopian synagogue =

An Aesopian synagogue is one that was built with its true purpose disguised. This term is used in relation to the former Russian Empire where there were severe restrictions against the building of Jewish places of worship. To get around the rules, architects would build a "mansion" or some other building that would end up being used as a synagogue. The word Aesopian is usually used with language, where it means "carrying a double meaning", a reference to the fables of Aesop.

== Examples ==
- Brodsky Choral Synagogue, Kyiv
- Galitska Synagogue, Kyiv
- Great Choral Synagogue, Kyiv
- Königsberg Synagogue, Kaliningrad

== See also ==
- Stadttempel, Vienna, Austria, fitted into a block of houses and hidden from plain view of the street, because of an edict from the Holy Roman Emperor Joseph II
