= Bilohorodka rural hromada =

Bilohorodka rural hromada Білогородська селищна громада
- Hromada
- Interactive map of Bilohorodka rural hromada
- Country: Ukraine
- Oblast: Kyiv Oblast
- Raion: Bucha Raion

Area
  - Total: 151.1 km^{2} (58.3 sq mi)

Population (2020)
  - Total: 25,392
  - Density: 168.0/km^{2} (435.2/sq mi)
- Settlements: 10
- Villages: 10

Bilohorodka rural hromada (Ukrainian: Білогородська селищна громада) is a hromada of Ukraine, located in Bucha Raion, Kyiv Oblast. Its administrative center is the village of Bilohorodka.

It has an area of 151.1 square kilometres (58.3 mi^{2}) and a population of 25,392, as of 2020.

The hromada contains 10 settlements, which are all villages:

- Bilohorodka
- Bobrytsia
- Hnativka
- Horenychi
- Luka
- Muzychi
- Nehrashi
- Sviatopetrivske
- Stoianka
- Shevchenkove

== See also ==
- List of hromadas of Ukraine
