= List of villages in Kyiv Oblast =

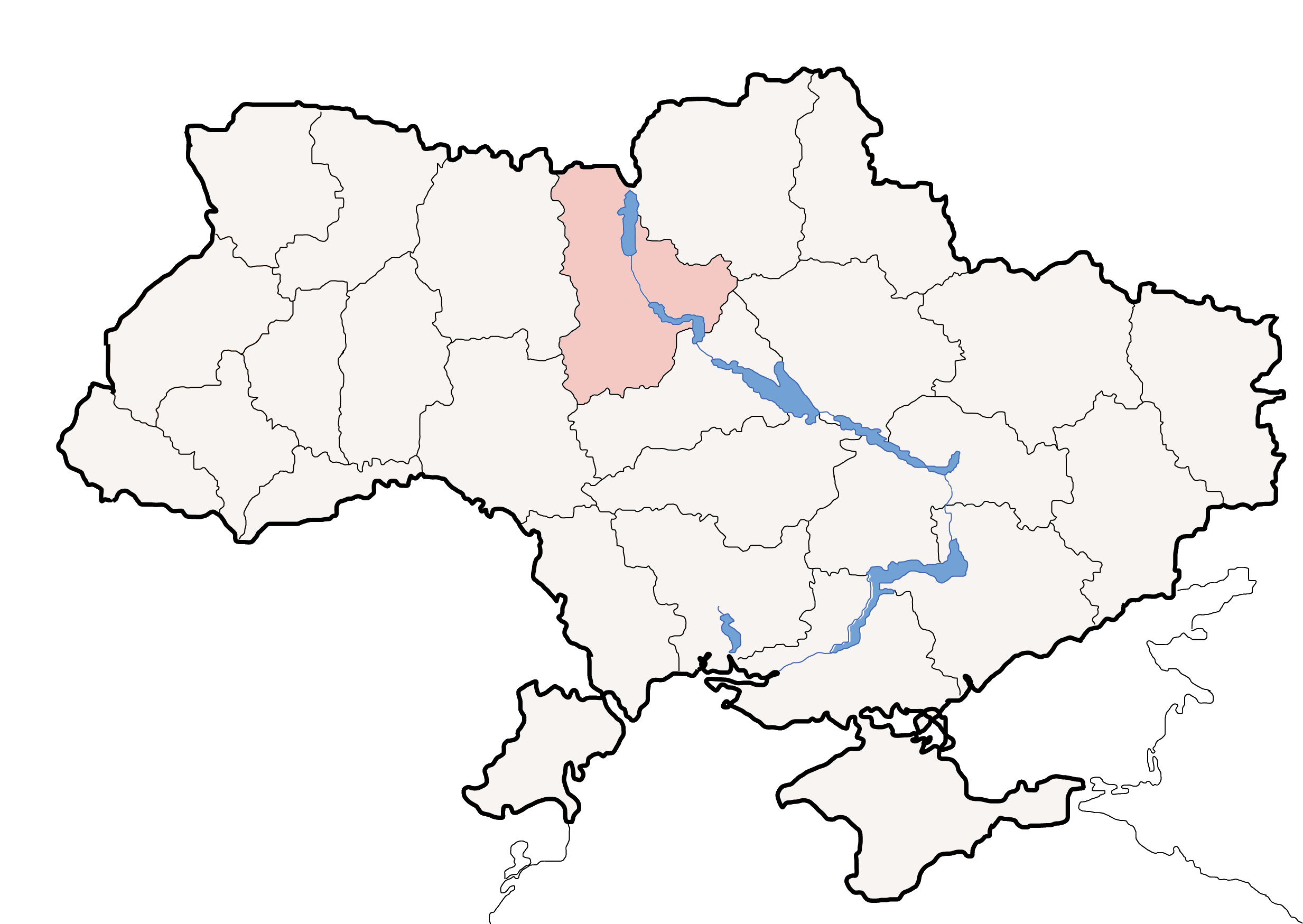
Map of the Kyiv Oblast.

The following is a list of villages in Kyiv Oblast in Ukraine.

== Bila Tserkva Raion ==
- Burkivtsi
- Kivshovata
- Kovalivka
- Marianivka
- Sokolivka
- Telizhyntsi

== Boryspil Raion ==
- Bohdanivka
- Bozhky
- Chubynske
- Dvirkivshchyna
- Glanyshiv
- Kapustyntsi
- Prolisky
- Shchaslyve

== Brovary Raion ==
- Arkadiyivka
- Bziv
- Hoholiv
- Kniazhychi
- Litky
- Lukianivka
- Shevchenkove
- Zavorychi

== Bucha Raion ==
- Bilohorodka
- Blystavytsia
- Bucha (village)
- Buzova
- Horenka
- Horenychi
- Kriukivshchyna
- Lubianka
- Motyzhyn
- Mykhailivka-Rubezhivka
- Myrotske
- Petropavlivska Borshchahivka

== Fastiv Raion ==
- Bahryn
- Dovha Hreblya
- Hatne
- Hruzke
- Krushynka
- Markhalivka
- Motovylivka
- Putrivka
- Vepryk
- Yasnohorodka
- Zelenyi Bir

== Obukhiv Raion ==
- Barakhty
- Hermanivka
- Khotiv
- Trypillia
- Velykyi Bukryn

== Vyshhorod Raion ==
- Abramivka
- Andriivka
- Demydiv
- Dibrova
- Dytiatky
- Hornostaipil
- Huta-Mezhyhirska
- Khotianivka
- Kopachi
- Novi Petrivtsi
- Obukhovychi
- Opachychi
- Tarasy
- Yaniv
