= Putrivka =

Rural locality in Kyiv Oblast, Ukraine

Putrivka Путрівка
- Village
- Location in Ukraine
- Coordinates: 50°12′15″N 30°16′27″E
- Country: Ukraine
- Oblast: Kyiv Oblast
- Raion: Fastiv Raion
- Village founded: 1701

Area
  - Total: 1.165 km^{2} (0.450 sq mi)
- Elevation: 193 m (633 ft)

Population (2001)
  - Total: 2,356
  - Density: 665.11/km^{2} (1,722.6/sq mi)
- Time zone: UTC+2 (EET)
  - Summer (DST): UTC+3 (EEST)
- Postal code: 08602
- Area code: +380 4571

Putrivka (Ukrainian: Путрівка) is a village in the Fastiv Raion, Kyiv Oblast, Ukraine. It belongs to Hlevakha settlement hromada, one of the hromadas of Ukraine. The village has a population of 1,567.

Until 18 July 2020, Putrivka belonged to Vasylkiv Raion. The raion was abolished that day as part of the administrative reform of Ukraine, which reduced the number of raions in Kyiv Oblast to seven. The area of Vasylkiv Raion was split among Bila Tserkva, Fastiv, and Obukhiv Raions, with Putrivka transferred to Fastiv Raion.
