= Sokolivka, Kyiv Oblast =

Village in Kyiv Oblast, Ukraine

Sokolivka Соколівка
- Village
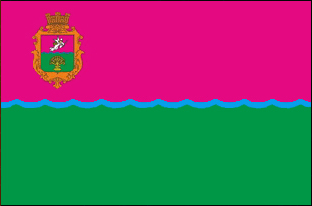
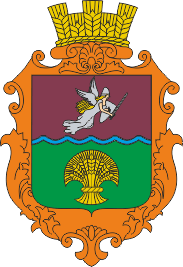
- Flag Coat of arms

- Location within Kyiv Oblast
- Coordinates: 49°54′33″N 30°12′14″E
- Country: Ukraine
- Oblast: Kyiv Oblast
- District: Bila Tserkva Raion
- Established: 1710

Area
  - Total: 2,631 km^{2} (1,016 sq mi)

Population
  - Total: 489
  - Density: 0.186/km^{2} (0.481/sq mi)
- Time zone: UTC+2 (EET)
  - Summer (DST): UTC+3 (EEST)
- Postal code: 08664
- Area code: +380 4571

Sokolivka (Ukrainian: Соколівка) is a village in Bila Tserkva Raion, Kyiv Oblast, Ukraine. It belongs to Hrebinky settlement hromada, one of the hromadas of Ukraine.

== Name ==
The name of the village comes from the name of the legendary town of Sokoliv, which contained honey Hlushky and Sokolivka.

== History ==
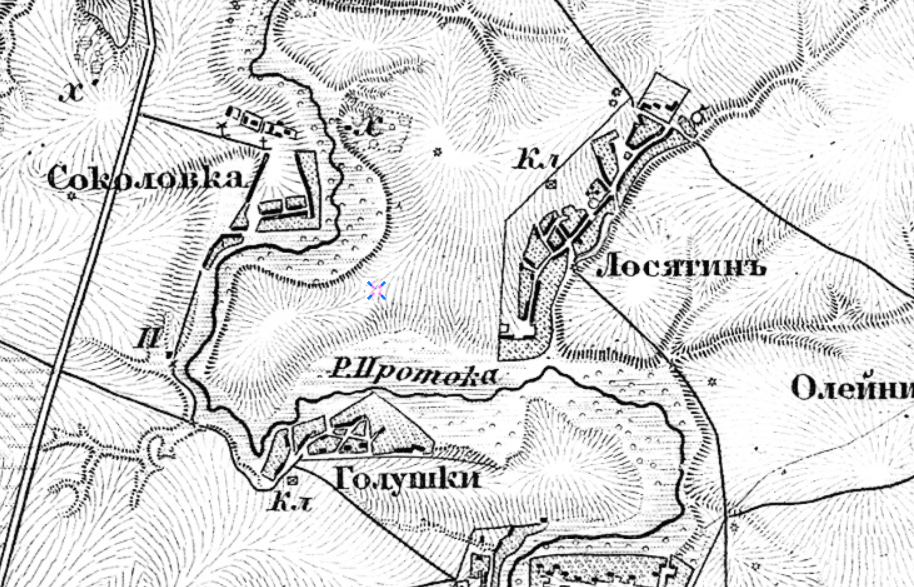
Old map from 1860

In archives of 1811 it is mentioned as a separate village and the residence of several nobles is recorded.

The Church of the Nativity of the Virgin was built in 1882. According to the archive, it was made with stone foundation, had a bell tower of 4 pillar. The church owned 3 tithes of 500 square meters yards of land.

The church had a parish school, organized since 1861. In 1892 a school was built, which functioned for 350 rubles from the state treasury and 130 from locals.

Until 18 July 2020, Sokolivka belonged to Vasylkiv Raion. The raion was abolished in July 2020 as part of the administrative reform of Ukraine, which reduced the number of raions of Kyiv Oblast to seven. The area of Vasylkiv Raion was split between Bila Tserkva, Fastiv, and Obukhiv Raions, with Sokolivka being transferred to Bila Tserkva Raion.
