= Markhalivka =

Rural locality in Kyiv Oblast, Ukraine

Markhalivka Мархалівка
- Village
- Interactive map of Markhalivka
- Coordinates: 50°16′26″N 30°22′20″E
- Country: Ukraine
- Oblast: Kyiv Oblast
- Region: Fastiv Raion
- Established: 1690

Government
  - Body: Markhalivska Village Council

Area
  - Total: 2,664 km^{2} (1,029 sq mi)

Population
  - Total: 1,316
  - Density: 468.09/km^{2} (1,212.3/sq mi)
- Zip code: 08633

Markhalivka (Ukrainian: Мархалівка) is a village in Fastiv Raion of Kyiv Oblast, Ukraine. It belongs to Hlevakha settlement hromada, one of the hromadas of Ukraine. The population is 1316 people.

The village is located 2 km east of the Highway M05 (Ukraine), and 2 km west of the Village of Ivankovichi. The distance to Kyiv is about 30 km, and the distance to Vasylkiv is 14 km.

Until 18 July 2020, Markhalivka belonged to Vasylkiv Raion. The raion was abolished in July 2020 as part of the administrative reform of Ukraine, which reduced the number of raions of Kyiv Oblast to seven. The area of Vasylkiv Raion was split between Bila Tserkva, Fastiv, and Obukhiv Raions, with Markhalivka being transferred to Fastiv Raion.

In the night on 25 May 2025, Shevchenko Street in Markhalivka was practically destroyed by Russian drone attack.
