= Yasnohorodka =

Rural locality in Kyiv Oblast, Ukraine

Yasnohorodka Ясногородка (Ukrainian)
- village
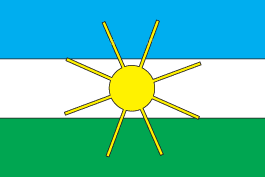
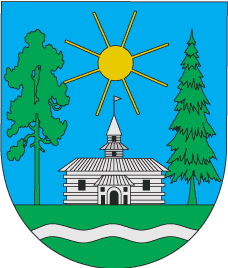
- Flag Coat of arms

- Location within Kyiv Oblast Location within Ukraine
- Coordinates: 50°21′23″N 30°1′12″E
- Country: Ukraine
- Oblast: Kyiv Oblast
- Raion: Fastiv Raion

Population (2008)
  - Total: 630

Yasnohorodka is a village in Fastiv Raion, Kyiv Oblast, Ukraine. It belongs to Byshiv rural hromada, one of the hromadas of Ukraine.

Until 18 July 2020, Yasnohorodka belonged to Makariv Raion. The raion was abolished that day as part of the administrative reform of Ukraine, which reduced the number of raions of Kyiv Oblast to seven. The area of Makariv Raion was split between Bucha and Fastiv Raions, with Yasnohorodka being transferred to Fastiv Raion.

Fighting happened in the village during the 2022 Russian invasion of Ukraine. The BBC reported that the community's church had been shelled and damaged.

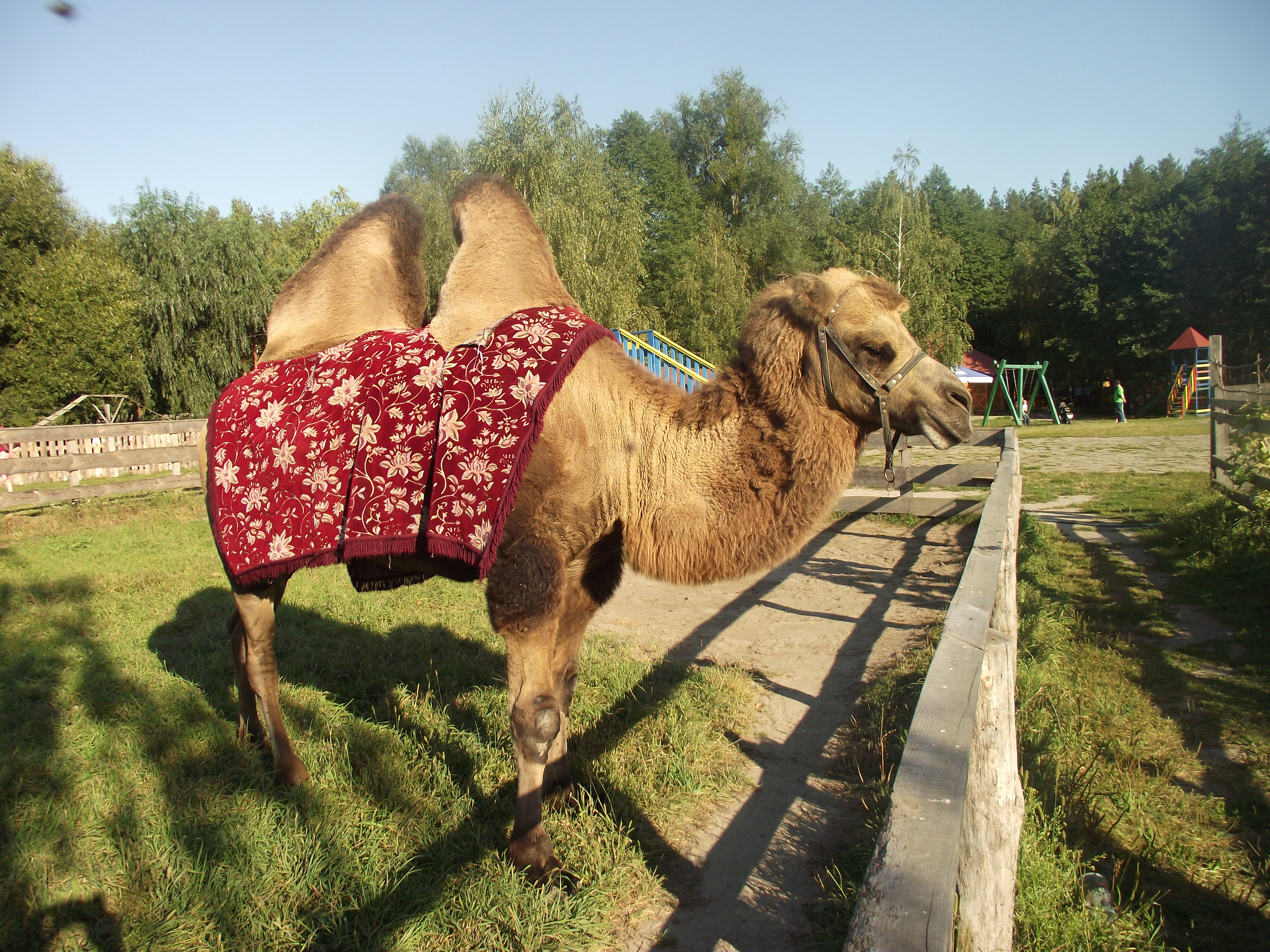
Camel inside the ecopark

Yasnohorodka is home to the Yasnohorodka family ecopark, which also includes an ostrich farm. The ecopark was heavily shelled by Russian troops in 2022, leading to the deaths of one-third of the animals in the zoo. Evacuation efforts began in the park in late March 2022.
