= Hlevakha =

Rural locality in Kyiv Oblast, Ukraine

Hlevakha Глеваха
- Rural settlement
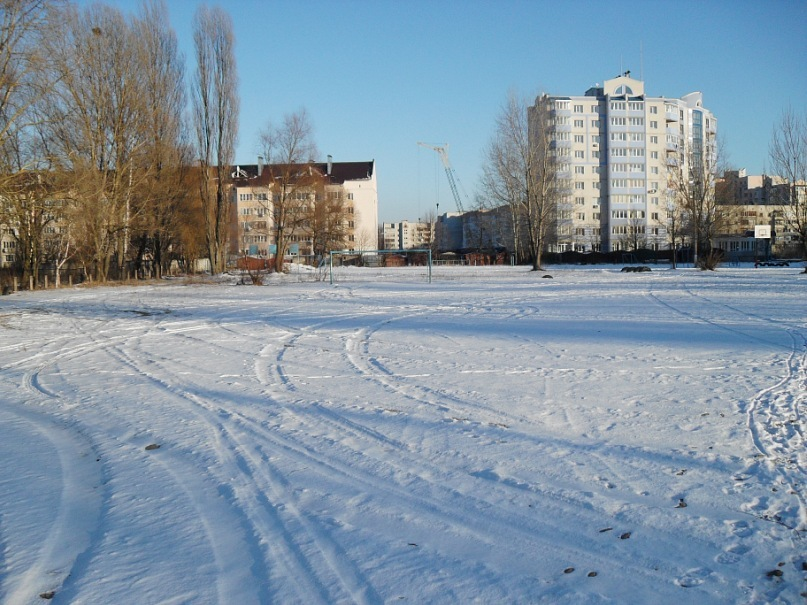
- Hlevakha in winter

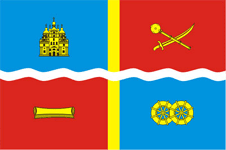
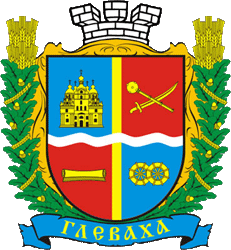
- Flag Coat of arms

- Location within Kyiv Oblast Location within Ukraine
- Coordinates: 50°15′44″N 30°17′22″E
- Country: Ukraine
- Oblast: Kyiv Oblast
- Raion: Fastiv Raion
- Hromada: Hlevakha settlement hromada
- First mentioned: 15th century

Population (2022)
  - Total: 8,800
- Postal code: 086XX
- Area code: +380 4471

Hlevakha (Ukrainian: Глеваха) is a rural settlement in Fastiv Raion of Kyiv Oblast (region) of Ukraine. It hosts the administration of Hlevakha settlement hromada, one of the hromadas of Ukraine. Population: 8,800 (2022 estimate).

Hlevakha is situated 10,5 km. to the south of Kyiv. There are a lot of dachas in this settlement.

== History ==
During the Ukrainian War of Independence Hlevakha was the site of battles led by forces of Ukrainian People's Army, Ukrainian Galician Army and rebels led by Otaman Zelenyi against the troops of Red and White Russians. On 29 August 1919 Ukrainian forces broke the Bolshevik front in the area and advanced on Kyiv.

Until 18 July 2020, Hlevakha belonged to Vasylkiv Raion. The raion was abolished that day as part of the administrative reform of Ukraine, which reduced the number of raions of Kyiv Oblast to seven. The area of Vasylkiv Raion was split between Bila Tserkva, Fastiv, and Obukhiv Raions, with Hlevakha being transferred to Fastiv Raion.

Until 26 January 2024, Hlevakha was designated urban-type settlement. On this day, a new law entered into force which abolished this status, and Hlevakha became a rural settlement.

== Gallery ==
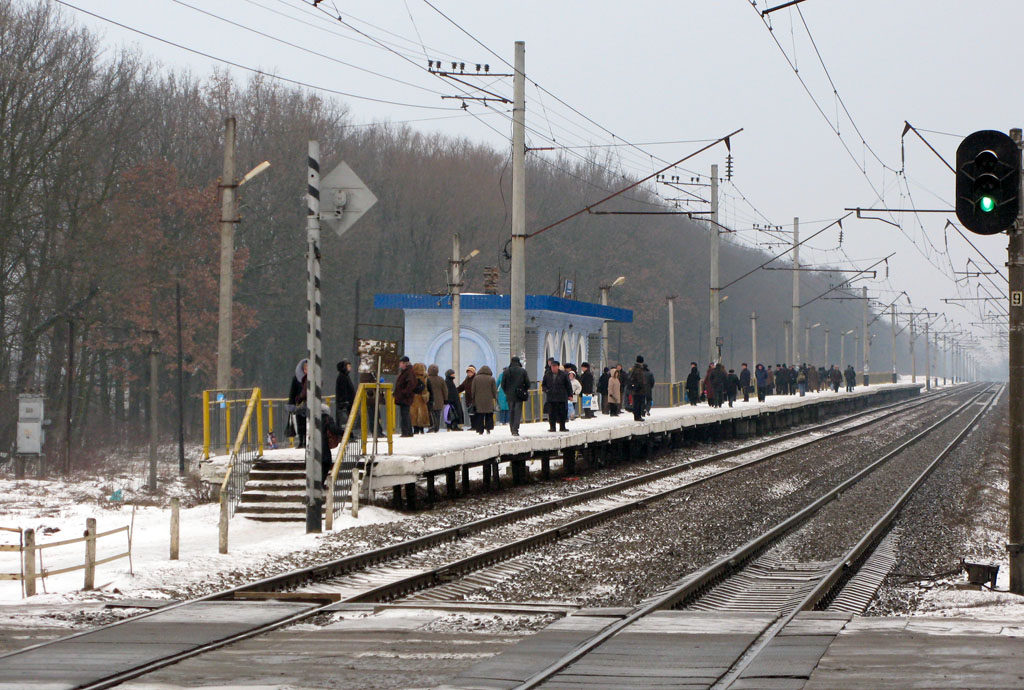
Hlevakha railway platform

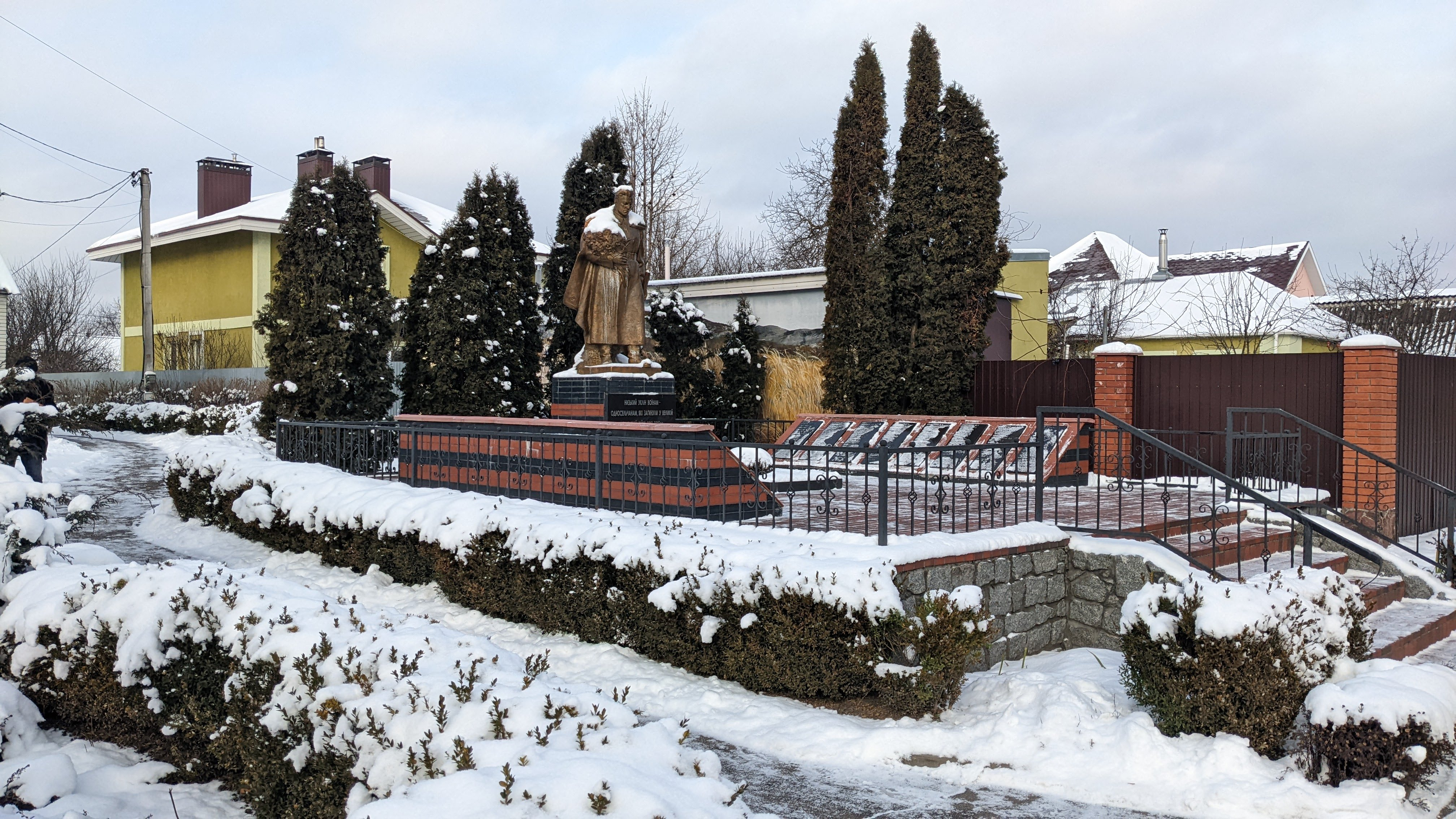
World War II monument

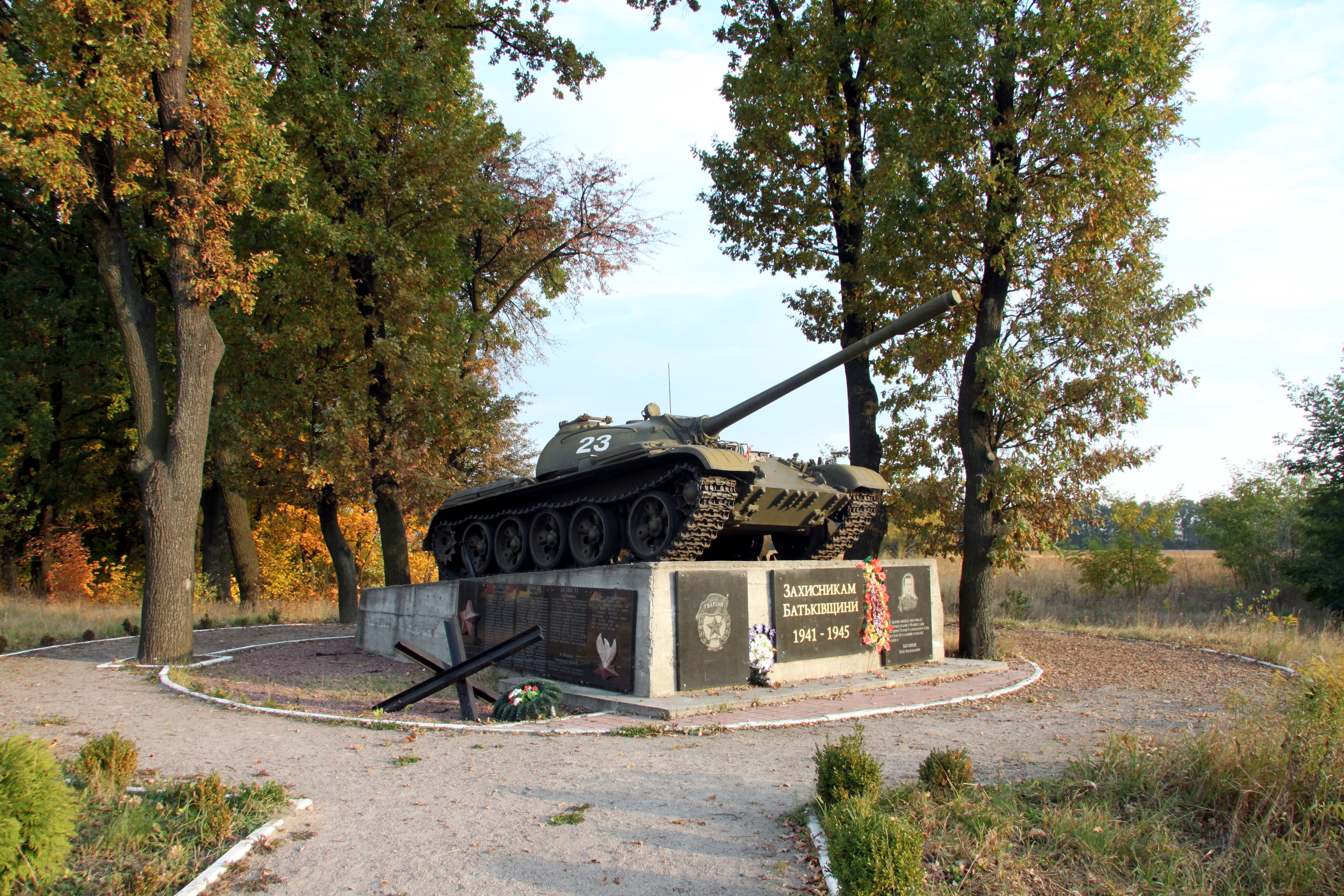
T-55 monument
