= Tomashivka rural hromada =

Tomashivka rural hromada Томашівська селищна громада
- Hromada
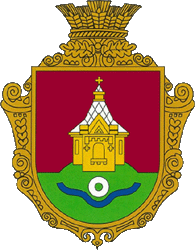
- Seal
- Interactive map of Tomashivka rural hromada
- Country: Ukraine
- Oblast: Kyiv
- Raion: Fastiv

Area
  - Total: 262.0 km^{2} (101.2 sq mi)

Population (2020)
  - Total: 3,957
  - Density: 15.10/km^{2} (39.12/sq mi)
- Settlements: 17
- Villages: 17

Tomashivka rural hromada (Ukrainian: Томашівська селищна громада) is a hromada of Ukraine, located in Fastiv Raion, Kyiv Oblast. Its administrative center is the village of Tomashivka.

It has an area of 262.0 square kilometres (101.2 mi^{2}) and a population of 3,957, as of 2020.

The hromada contains 17 settlements, which are all villages:

- Tomashivka
- Vasylivka
- Velyki Huliaky
- Vyshnia
- Vilne
- Vilshanska Nyva
- Demynivka
- Didivshchyna
- Dorohynka
- Konopelky
- Konchaky
- Koshchiivka
- Pryshyvalnia
- Sosnivka
- Fedorivka
- Yurivka
- Yaroshivka

== See also ==
- List of hromadas of Ukraine
