= Krushynka =

Rural locality in Kyiv Oblast, Ukraine

Coordinates: 50°13′50″N 30°22′11″E

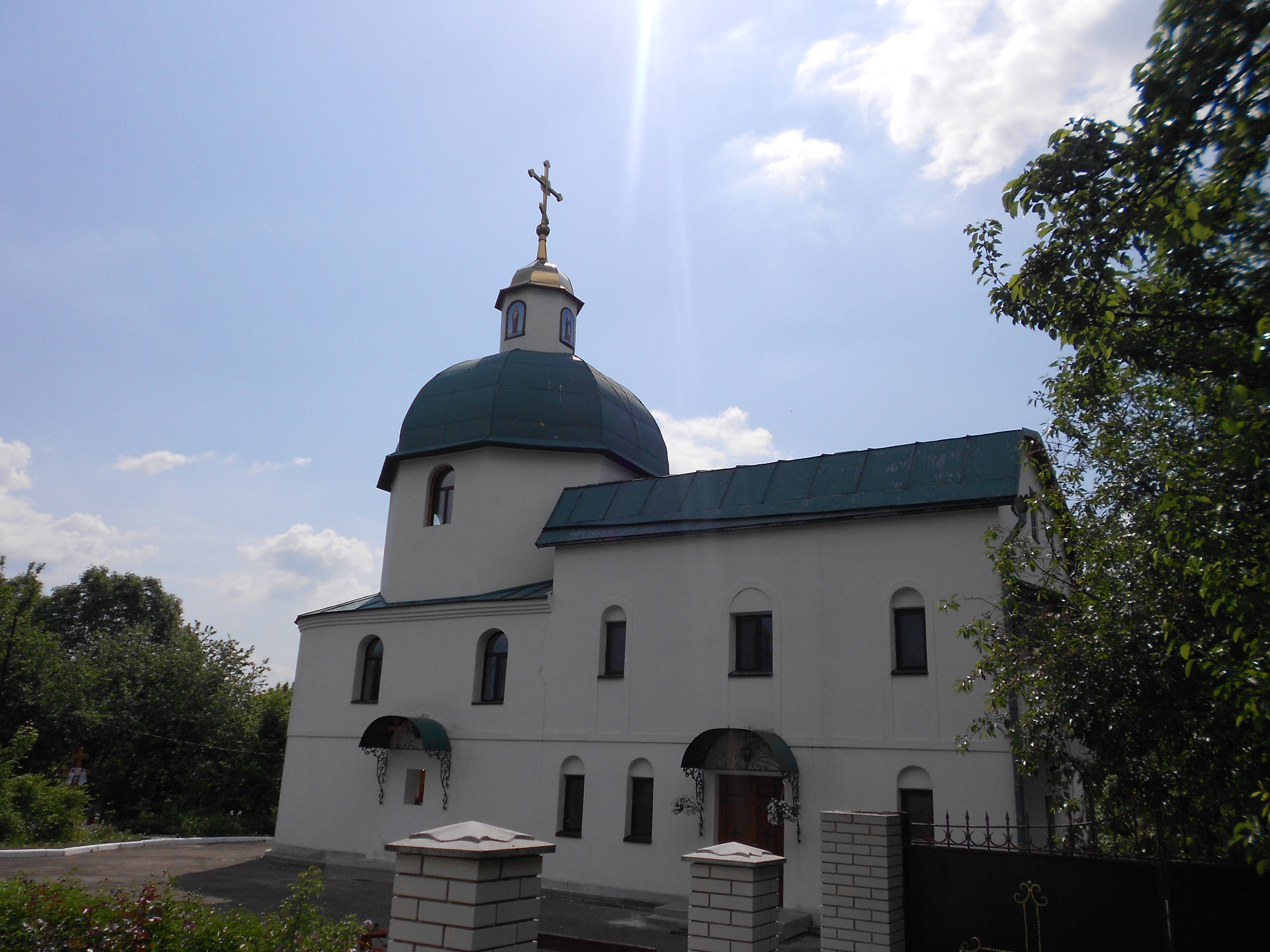
Church in center of village, 2013

Krushynka (Ukrainian: Крушинка) is a small village in Fastiv Raion in the Kyiv Oblast (province) of northern Ukraine. It belongs to Hlevakha settlement hromada, one of the hromadas of Ukraine. Krushynka has 347 inhabitants.

== History ==
It is known at least from the 16th century.

In November 1918 the village was a site of fighting between the Sich Riflemen and Russian supporters of Pavlo Skoropadsky. In February 1919 another battle against Bolshevik forces took place here, and in August 1919 the Bolsheviks were opposed by forces of the Ukrainian Galician Army in the area.

Until 18 July 2020, Krushynka belonged to Vasylkiv Raion. The raion was abolished that day as part of the administrative reform of Ukraine, which reduced the number of raions of Kyiv Oblast to seven. The area of Vasylkiv Raion was split between Bila Tserkva, Fastiv, and Obukhiv Raions, with Krushynka being transferred to Fastiv Raion.

== Nature ==
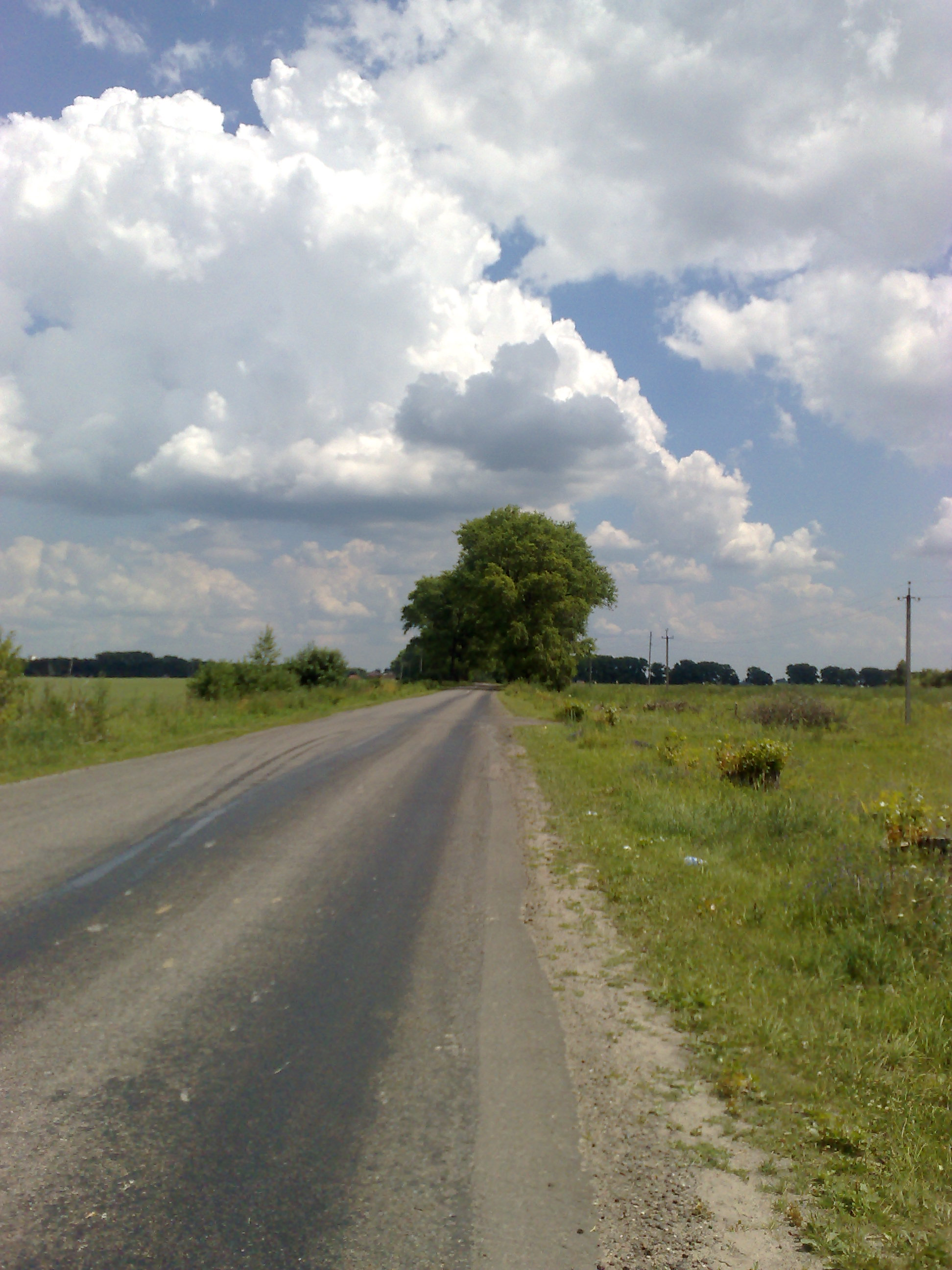
Road to Krushynka.

== Transport ==
There is a bus from Kyiv to Vasylkiv. Then there is a local bus from the bus stop "Krushynka" to the center of village.

== Architecture ==
=== Shops ===
In the time of the Soviet Union, there was a Prodmag (food market, Prod(ovolstvennyi) Mag(azin) on Russian). That shop is still there, but it has modern goods. It is at center of village on Kyivska Street.

Another store among the people just hendelyk, near the so-called rivchak (little brook). A third store opened in 2008, and is located outside the village.

== Culture ==
=== Village club ===
In the time of the Soviet Union, there was a village club. But with the ending of the Soviet Union, the club died.

== Gallery ==
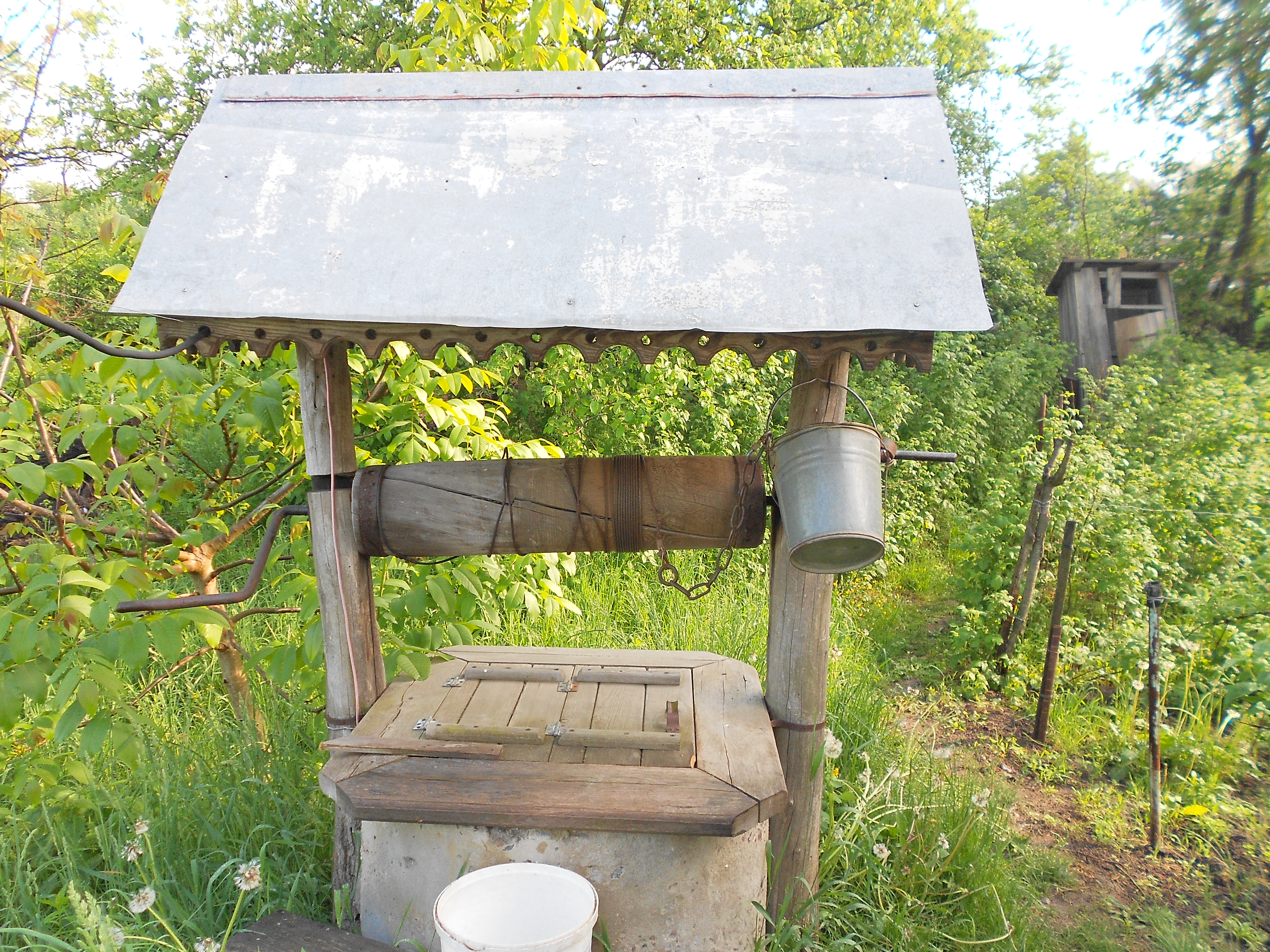
One of Krushinian wheel

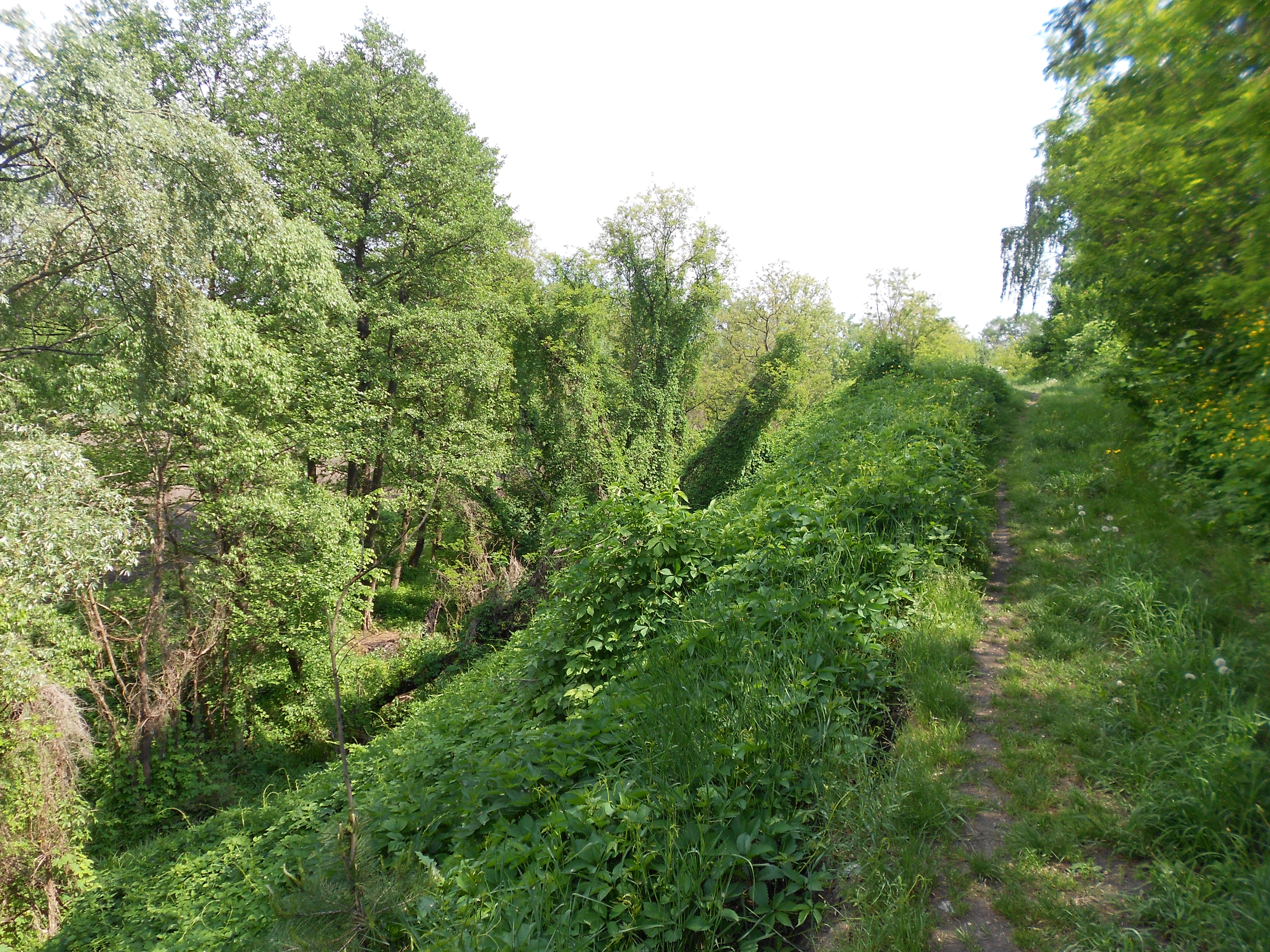
Nature

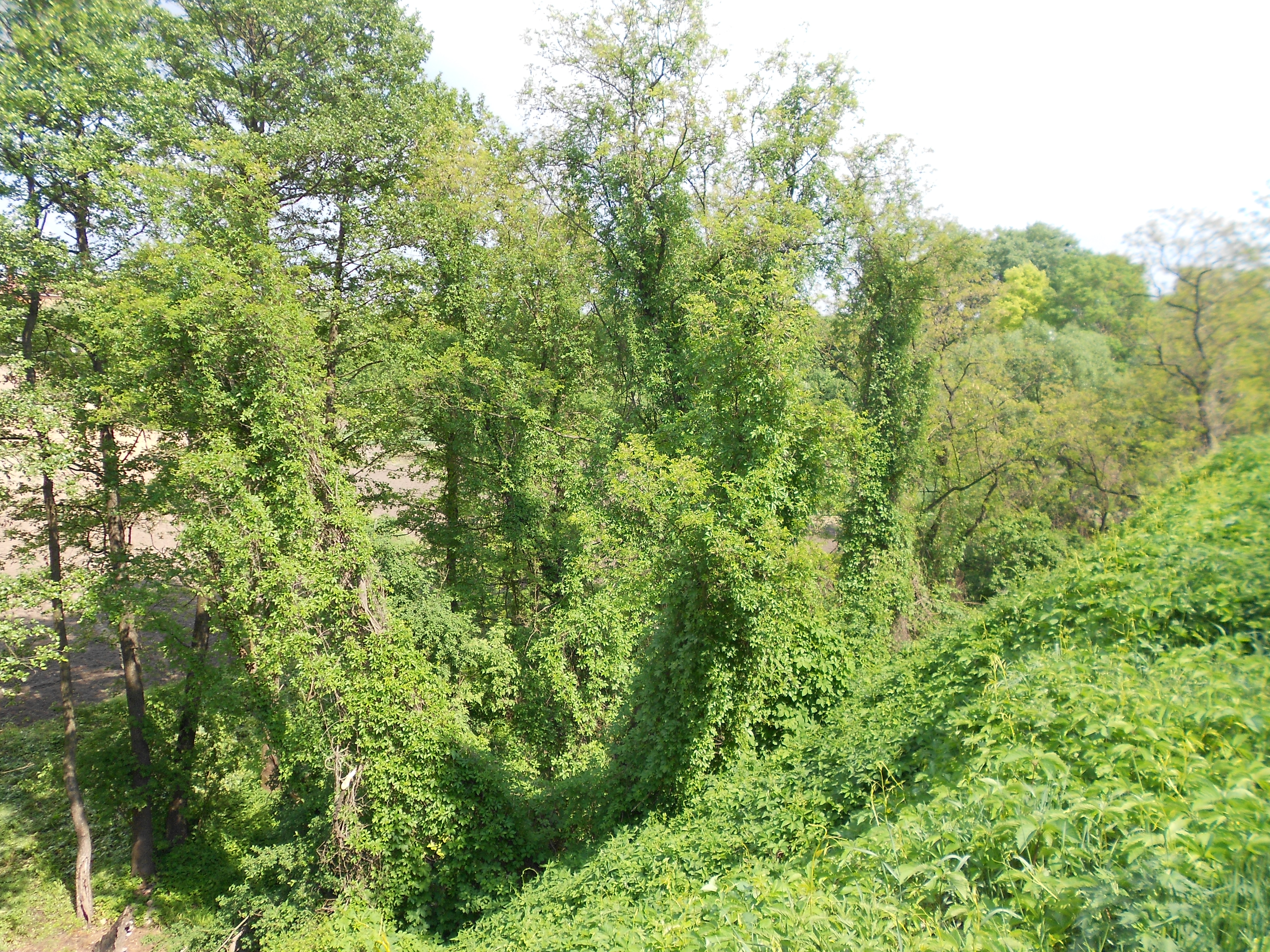
Nature

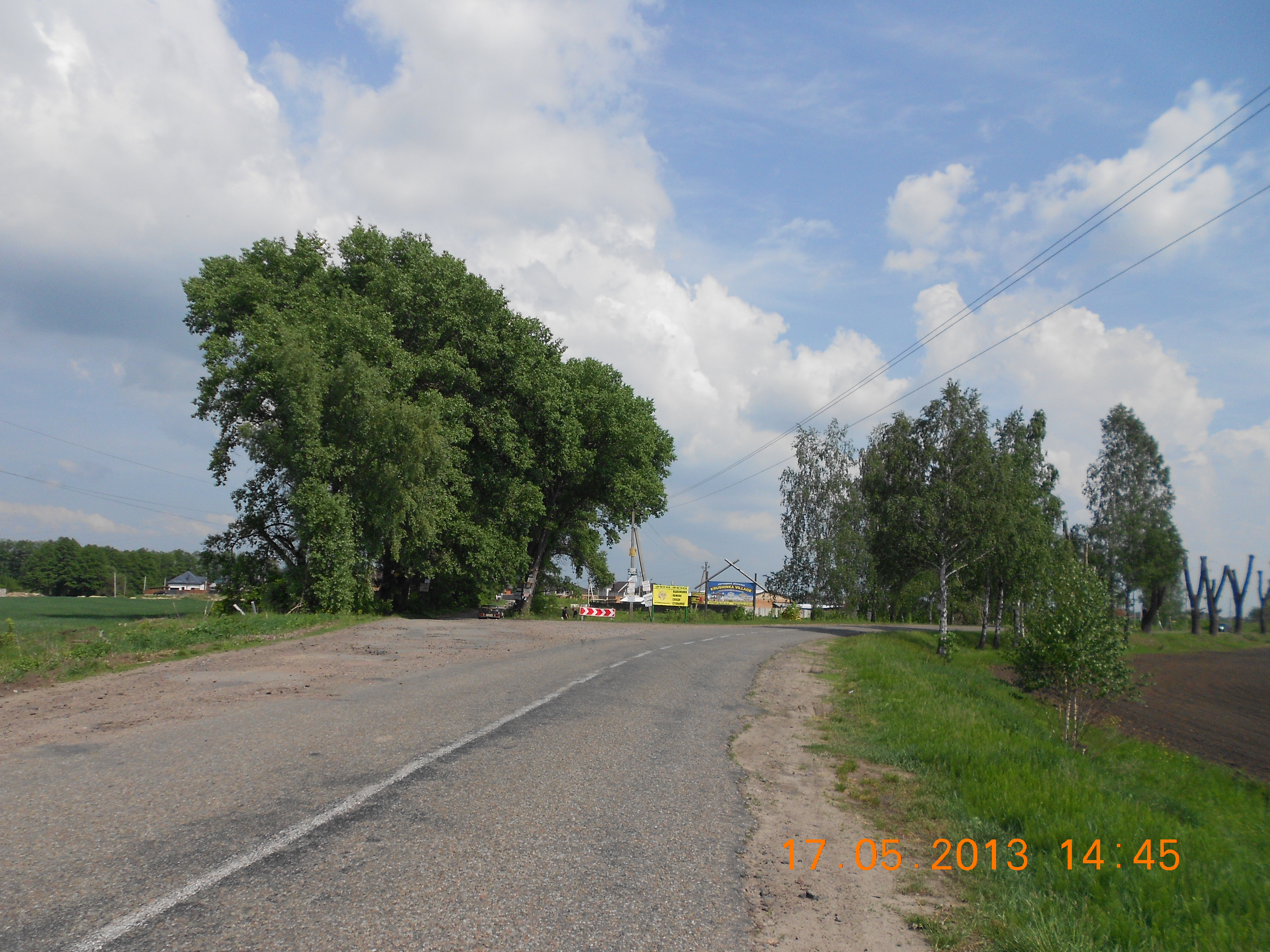
A way to a village

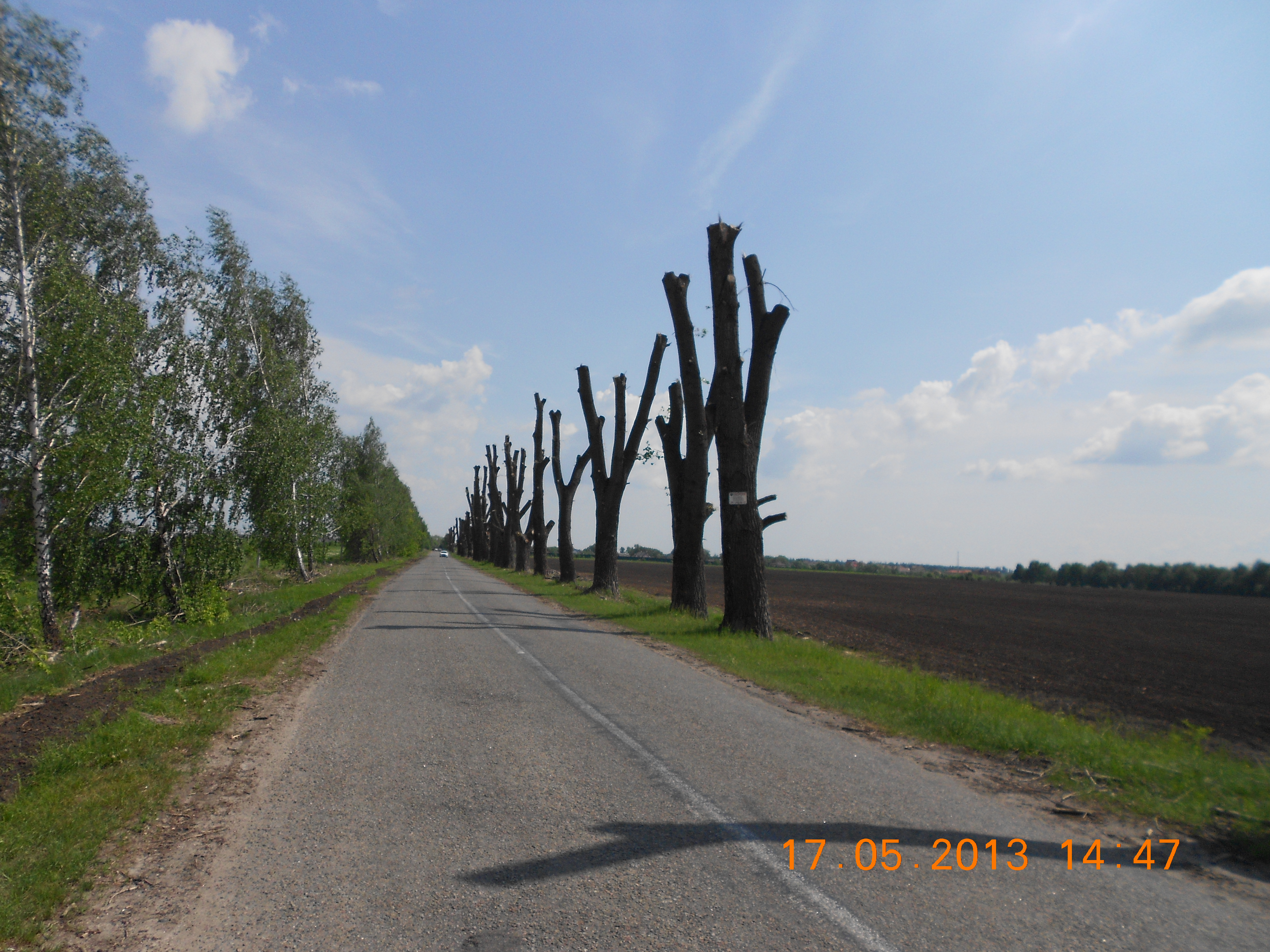
A way to a village

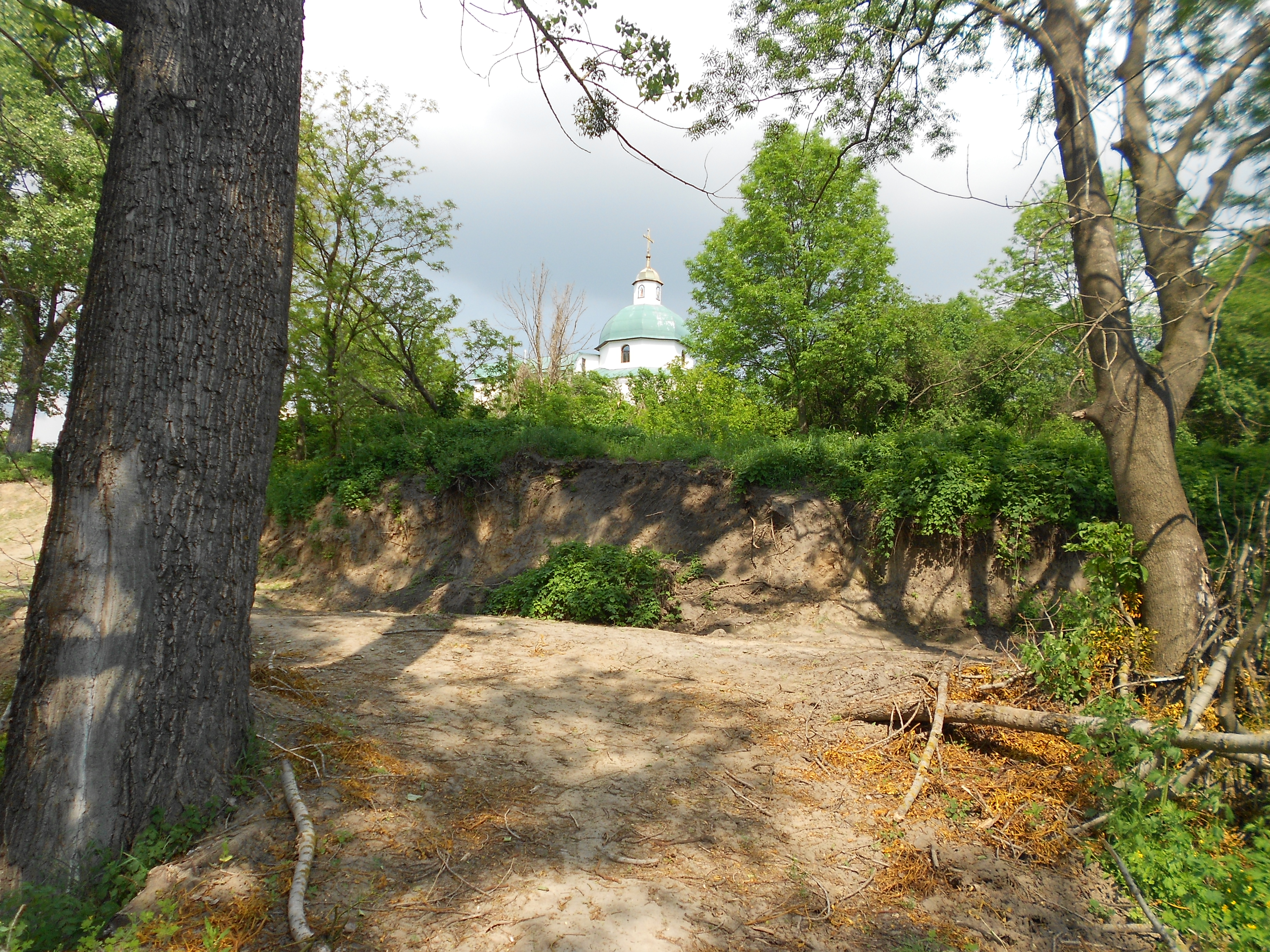
Near pool Shkilnyi. On the back — church
