= Zelenyi Bir =

Coordinates: 50°15′0″N 30°22′12″E

Zelenyi Bir is a small village in Fastiv Raion, Kyiv Oblast of central Ukraine. It belongs to Hlevakha settlement hromada, one of the hromadas of Ukraine. Zelenyi Bir has 794 inhabitants.

== History ==
Zelenyi Bir was founded in 1950 as collective farm. It was a village for the workers of a chicken farm. There are two shops, a school, a daycare, a post-office and an ambulance station. Near Zelenyi Bir there are three ponds.

Until 18 July 2020, Zelenyi Bir belonged to Vasylkiv Raion. The raion was abolished that day as part of the administrative reform of Ukraine, which reduced the number of raions of Kyiv Oblast to seven. The area of Vasylkiv Raion was split between Bila Tserkva, Fastiv, and Obukhiv Raions, with Zelenyi Bir being transferred to Fastiv Raion.

== Transportation ==
There are two busses serving Zelenyi Bir: one goes to the Glevaha railway station, the other to Kyiv. It is 5 km to the railway station and 20 km to Kyiv. A ticket to Glevaha costs 2 hrivnas and one to Kyiv is 5 hrivnas.

== Gallery ==
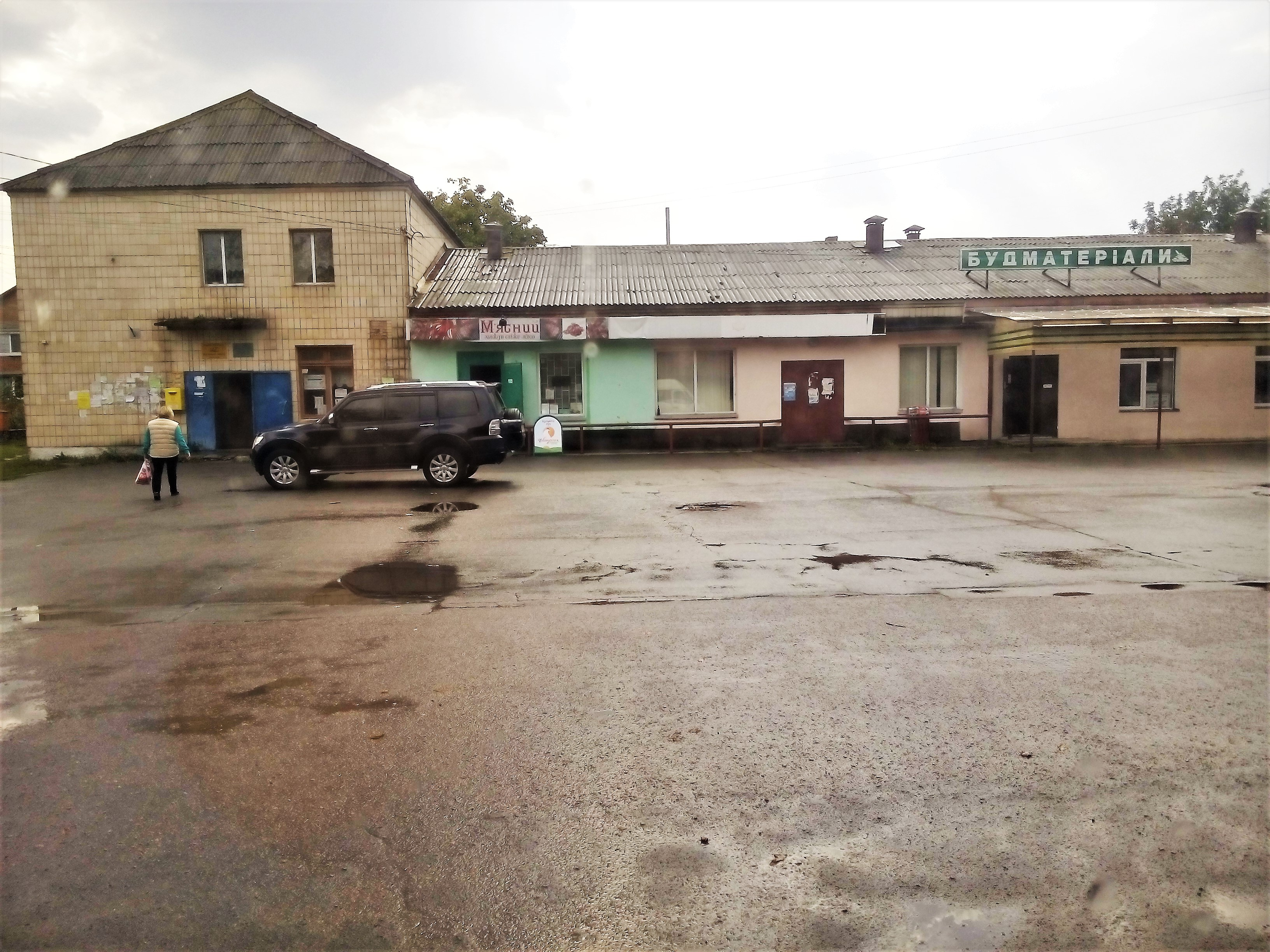
Center of village

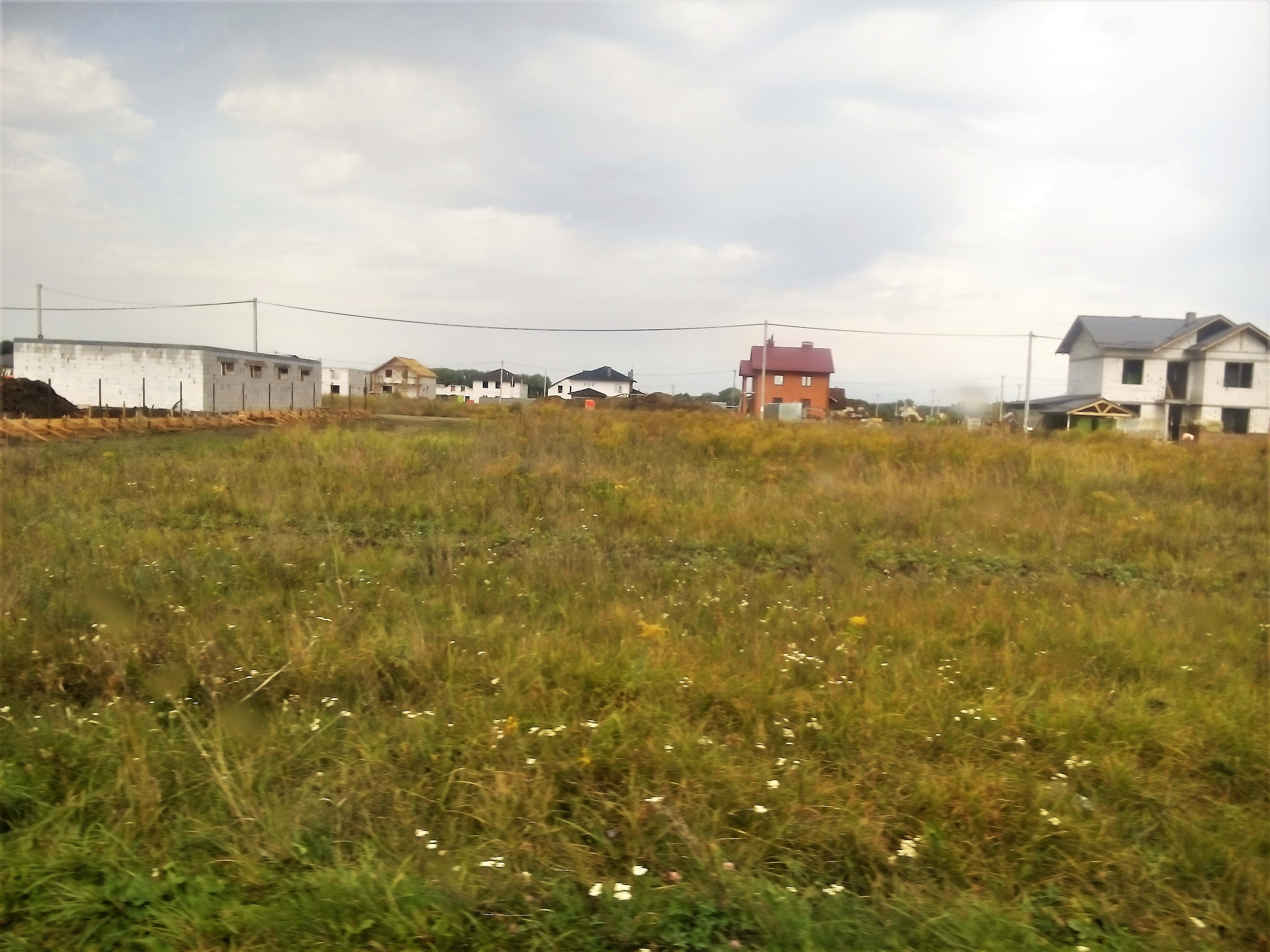
Cottedges
