= Vasylkiv Raion =

Former subdivision of Kyiv Oblast, Ukraine

Vasylkiv Raion Васильківський район
- Raion
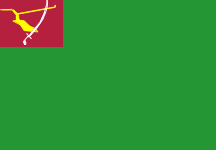
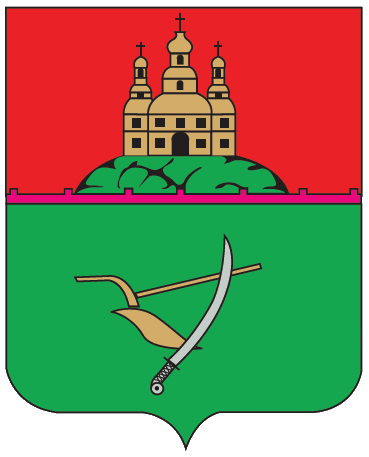
- Flag Coat of arms

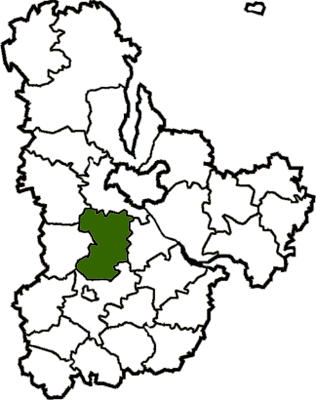
- Coordinates: 50°6′5″N 30°14′45″E
- Country: Ukraine
- Region: Kyiv Oblast
- Disestablished: 18 July 2020
- Admin. center: Vasylkiv
- Subdivisions: List: — city councils; — settlement councils; — rural councils; Number of localities: — cities; — urban-type settlements; 66 — villages; — rural settlements

Population (2020)
  - Total: 57,613
- Time zone: UTC+02:00 (EET)
  - Summer (DST): UTC+03:00 (EEST)
- Area code: +380

Vasylkiv Raion (Ukrainian: Васильківський район) was a raion (district) in Kyiv Oblast of Ukraine. Its administrative center was Vasylkiv which is incorporated separately as a town of oblast significance and did not belong to the raion. The raion was abolished on 18 July 2020 as part of the administrative reform of Ukraine, which reduced the number of raions of Kyiv Oblast to seven. The area of Vasylkiv Raion was split between Bila Tserkva, Fastiv, and Obukhiv Raions. The last estimate of the raion population was 57,613 (2020 est.).

== Subdivisions ==
At the time of disestablishment, the raion consisted of five hromadas,

- Hlevakha settlement hromada with the administration in the urban-type settlement of Hlevakha, transferred to Fastiv Raion;
- Hrebinky settlement hromada with the administration in the urban-type settlement of Hrebinky, transferred to Bila Tserkva Raion;
- Kalynivka settlement hromada with the administration in the urban-type settlement of Kalynivka, transferred to Fastiv Raion;
- Kovalivka rural hromada with the administration in the selo of Kovalivka, transferred to Bila Tserkva Raion.
- Vasylkiv urban hromada with the administration in Vasylkiv, also included the city of Vasylkiv, transferred to Obukhiv Raion.

Vasylkiv raion consisted of 39 village councils (sil's'ka rada); and 65 villages (selo). The settlements of Vasylkiv Raion included:

- Velyka Bugaivka
- Plesetske
- Ivankovychi
- Zelenyi Bir
- Krushynka
- Hlevakha
- Dereviane

== Links ==
- Vasylkiv Today - the latest news of the city Vasylkiv and Vasylkiv district
