= Kalynivka settlement hromada, Fastiv Raion, Kyiv Oblast =

Kalynivka settlement hromada Калинівська селищна громада
- Hromada
- Interactive map of Kalynivka settlement hromada
- Country: Ukraine
- Oblast: Kyiv
- Raion: Fastiv

Area
  - Total: 193.3 km^{2} (74.6 sq mi)

Population (2020)
  - Total: 15,777
  - Density: 81.62/km^{2} (211.4/sq mi)
- Settlements: 15
- Villages: 14
- Towns: 1

Kalynivka settlement hromada (Ukrainian: Калинівська селищна громада) is a hromada of Ukraine, located in Fastiv Raion, Kyiv Oblast. Its administrative center is the town of Kalynivka.

It has an area of 193.3 square kilometres (74.6 mi^{2}) and a population of 15,777, as of 2020.

The hromada includes 15 settlements: 1 town (Kalynivka), and 14 villages:

- Bahryn
- Bobrytsia
- Varovychi
- Velyka Soltanivka
- Danylivka
- Dibrova
- Kozhukhivka
- Lypovyi Skytok
- Mala Soltanivka
- Plesetske
- Poradivka
- Rulykiv
- Skrypky
- Khlepcha

== See also ==
- List of hromadas of Ukraine
