= Hlevakha settlement hromada =

Hlevakha settlement hromada Глевахівська селищна громада
- Hromada
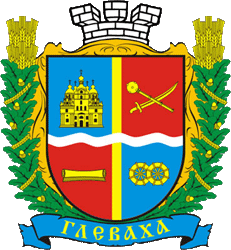
- Coat of arms
- Interactive map of Hlevakha settlement hromada
- Country: Ukraine
- Oblast: Kyiv Oblast
- Raion: Fastiv Raion

Area
  - Total: 96.6 km^{2} (37.3 sq mi)

Population (2020)
  - Total: 12,776
  - Density: 132/km^{2} (343/sq mi)
- Settlements: 13
- Rural settlements: 1
- Villages: 11
- Towns: 1

Hlevakha settlement hromada (Ukrainian: Глевахівська селищна громада) is a hromada of Ukraine, located in Fastiv Raion, Kyiv Oblast. Its administrative center is the town of Hlevakha.

It has an area of 96.6 square kilometres (37.3 mi^{2}) and a population of 12,776, as of 2020.

The hromada includes 13 settlements: 1 town (Hlevakha), 11 villages:

- Berezenshchyna
- Borysiv
- Derevianky
- Zaitsiv
- Zalizne
- Kobtsi
- Krushynka
- Kriachky
- Mala Buhaiivka
- Markhalivka
- Putrivka

And 1 rural-type settlement: Zelenyi Bir.

== See also ==
- List of hromadas of Ukraine
