= Shebelinka gas field =

Ukrainian natural gas field

Shebelinka
- Location within Kharkiv Oblast Location within Ukraine
- Country: Ukraine
- Region: Kharkiv Oblast
- Offshore/onshore: onshore
- Coordinates: 49.4486°N 36.5825°E
- Operator: Ukrnafta

Field history
- Discovery: 1950
- Start of development: 1956
- Start of production: 1958

Production
- Recoverable gas: 520×10^{9} m^{3} 18.4×10^{12} cu ft

The Shebelinka gas field (Ukrainian: Шебелинське газоконденсатне родовище) is a natural gas field that was discovered in 1950 in Kharkiv Oblast.

It began production in 1956 and produces natural gas and condensates. The total proven reserves of the Shebelinka gas field are around 18.4 trillion cubic feet (520 billion m³). The oil at the plant is refined at the Shebelinka Gas Condensate and Oil Processing Branch, which is operated by Ukrgasvydobuvannya and one of only two operating oil refineries in Ukraine.

== History ==
The field was first discovered in 1950, and began production in 1956.

In December 2019, Naftogaz began drilling well 888 at the field in a new partnership with Schlumberger, with a projected initial flow rate of around 100,000 cubic metres per day. Following the Russian invasion of Ukraine in 2022, the infrastructure of the field began a routine target of Russian forces, and in late March 2025, drones attacked lots of Naftogaz's facilities in the eighteenth attack since the start of the war.

== Gas reserves ==
Proven reserve estimates have been revised multiple times since the field's discovery. In 1959, shortly after production began, the total reserves were 400 billion cubic metres, which rose to 500 billion cubic metres in 1969. By 2008, the approved state reserves were 688 billion cubic metres, with other measures finding 712 billion cubic metres. By January 2022, it was found that the field had already produced 588 billion cubic metres, which was about 90.5% of the 650 billion cubic metres that were approved as the reserves in 1987, and only 107.8 billion cubic metres remained.

Annual production from the field in recent years has been around 1,700 to 1,900 million cubic metres, which was found to be balanced as the level between extraction and natural gas migrating was the same.
