= Fastiv Raion =

Subdivision of Kyiv Oblast, Ukraine

Fastiv Raion Фастівський район
- Raion
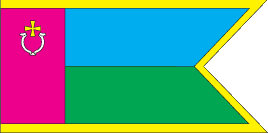
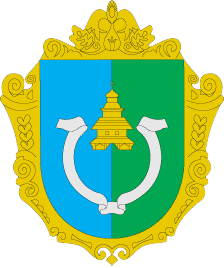
- Flag Coat of arms

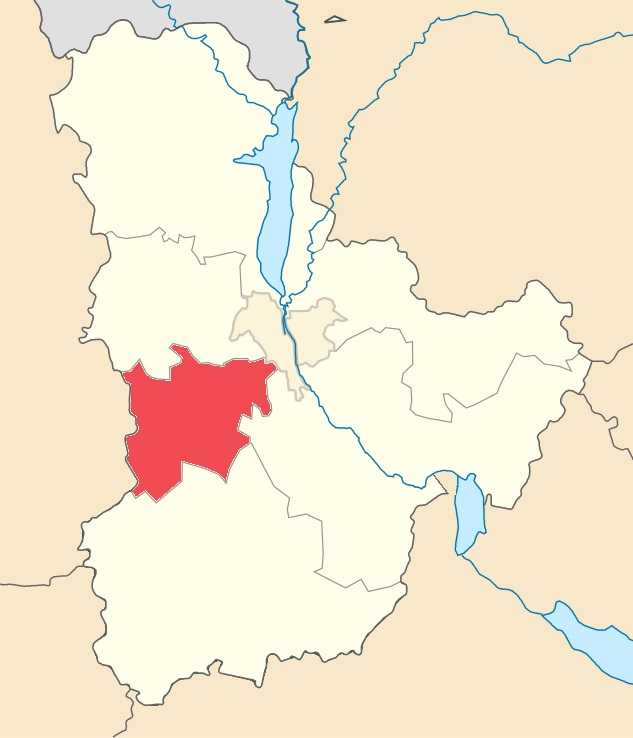
- Fastiv Raion after the 2020 raion reform
- Interactive map of Fastiv Raion
- Coordinates: 50°2′42″N 29°54′32″E
- Country: Ukraine
- Oblast: Kyiv Oblast
- Admin. center: Fastiv
- Subdivisions: 9 hromadas

Area
  - Total: 1,761.2 km^{2} (680.0 sq mi)

Population (2022)
  - Total: 184,095
  - Density: 104.53/km^{2} (270.73/sq mi)
- Time zone: UTC+02:00 (EET)
  - Summer (DST): UTC+03:00 (EEST)
- Area code: +380

Fastiv Raion (Ukrainian: Фастівський район) is a raion (district) in Kyiv Oblast of Ukraine. Its administrative center is the city of Fastiv. Population: 184,095 (2022 estimate).

On 18 July 2020, as part of the administrative reform of Ukraine, the number of raions of Kyiv Oblast was reduced to seven, and the area of Fastiv Raion was significantly expanded. The January 2020 estimate of the raion population was 30,331 (2020 est.).

== Subdivisions ==
=== Current ===
After the reform in July 2020, the raion consisted of 10 hromadas:

Fastiv Raion subdivisions
Hromada (Community)	Admin. center	Population (2020)	Transferred/Retained from
Boiarka urban	Boiarka	53,620	Kyiv-Sviatoshyn Raion;
Byshiv rural	Byshiv	6,073	Makariv Raion;
Chabany settlement	Chabany	11,404	Kyiv-Sviatoshyn Raion;
Fastiv urban	Fastiv	62,720	city of oblast significance of Fastiv;
Hatne rural	Hatne	9,417	Kyiv-Sviatoshyn Raion;
Hlevakha settlement	Hlevakha	12,776	Vasylkiv Raion;
Kalynivka settlement	Kalynivka	15,777	Vasylkiv Raion;
Kozhanka settlement	Kozhanka	8,050	
Tomashivka rural	Tomashivka	3,957	

=== Before 2020 ===
Fastiv Raion in Kyiv Oblast (1966-2020)

Before the 2020 reform, the raion consisted of two hromadas,

- Kozhanka settlement hromada with the administration in Kozhanka;
- Tomashivka rural hromada with the administration in Tomashivka.
