= Kyiv Oblast =

Oblast (region) of Ukraine

Coordinates: 50°15′N 30°30′E

Kyiv Oblast Київська область
- Oblast
- Kyivska oblast
- Flag Coat of arms
- Nickname: Київщина (Kyivshchyna)
- Interactive map of Kyiv Oblast
- Country: Ukraine
- Administrative center: Kyiv

Government
  - Head of the Kyiv Oblast State Administration: Mykola Kalashnyk (since 24 March 2025)
  - Oblast council: 84 seats
  - Chairperson: Yaroslav Dobryanskyy (acting)

Area
  - Total: 28,131 km^{2} (10,861 sq mi)
  - Rank: Ranked 8th

Population (2026)
  - Total: 1,939,973
  - Rank: Ranked 10th
  - Density: 68.962/km^{2} (178.61/sq mi)

GDP (nominal, 2021)
  - Total: ₴ 292 billion (€6.0 billion)
  - Per capita: ₴ 162,696 (€3,345)
- Time zone: UTC+2 (EET)
  - Summer (DST): UTC+3 (EEST)
- Postal code: 07-09
- Area code: +380 44 (Kyiv city) +380 45 (outside Kyiv city)
- ISO 3166 code: UA-32
- Vehicle registration: AI
- Raions: 7
- Cities: 26
- Settlements: 30
- Villages: 1,127
- HDI (2022): 0.737 high
- FIPS 10-4: UP13
- NUTS statistical regions of Ukraine: UA61
- Website: koda.gov.ua

Kyiv Oblast (Ukrainian: Київська область, romanized: Kyivska oblast, IPA: [ˈkɪjiu̯sʲkɐ ˈɔblɐsʲtʲ]), also called Kyivshchyna (Київщинa, IPA: [ˈkɪjiu̯ʃtʃɪnɐ]), is an oblast (province) in central and northern Ukraine. It surrounds, but does not include, the city of Kyiv, which is administered as a city with special status. However, Kyiv also serves as the administrative center of the oblast. The Kyiv metropolitan area extends out from Kyiv city into parts of the oblast, which is significantly dependent on the urban economy and transportation of Kyiv.

The population of Kyiv Oblast is 1,795,079 (2022 estimate). Its largest city is Bila Tserkva, with a population over 200,000.

The Chernobyl Exclusion Zone is in the northern part of Kyiv Oblast. It is administered separately from the oblast and public access is prohibited.

== History ==
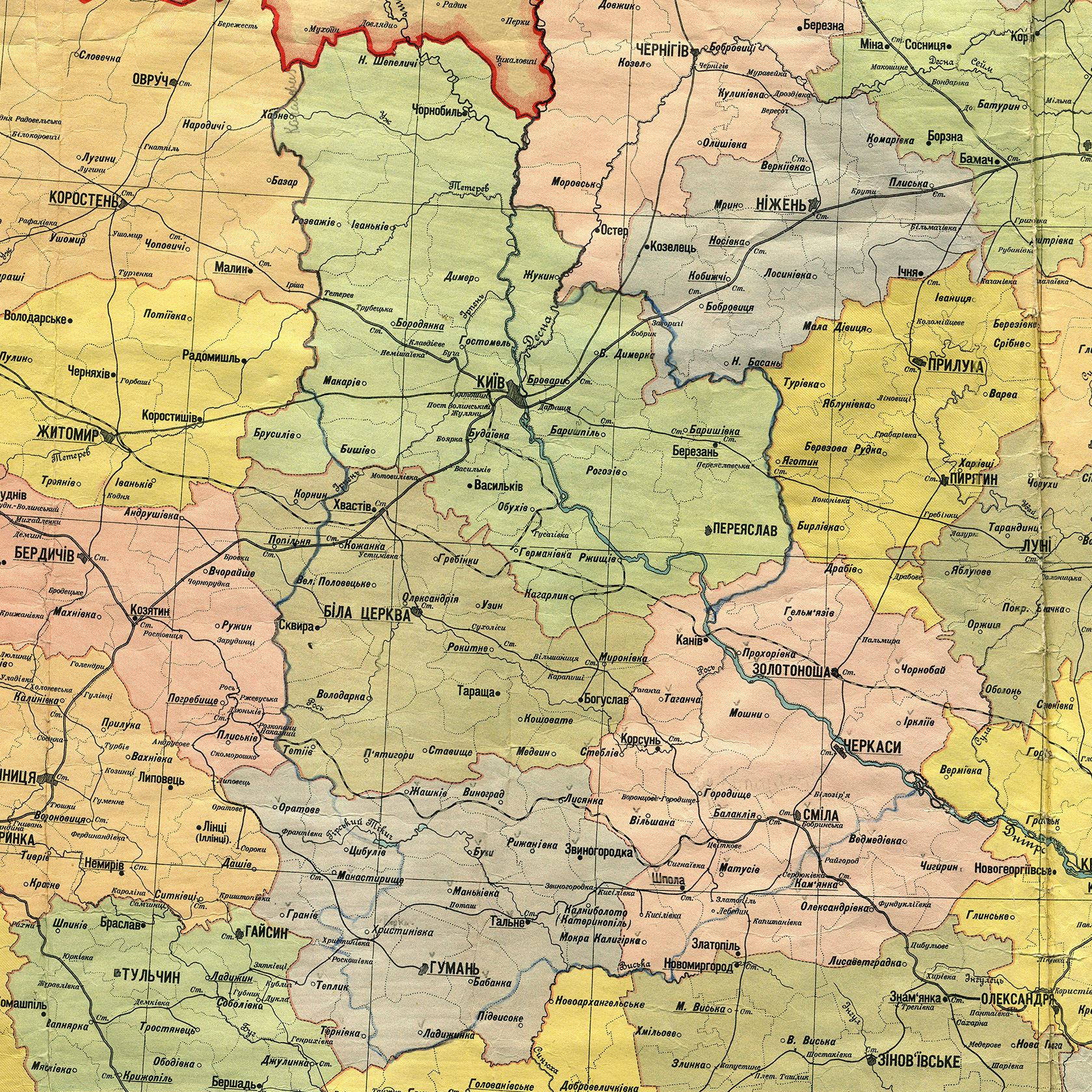
Okruhas of the former Kyiv Governorate in 1927

Kyiv Oblast was created as part of the Ukrainian Soviet Socialist Republic on 27 February 1932, as one of the first five original oblasts in Ukraine. Originally, it included 98 raions and 2 city councils (miskradas) subordinated to Kyiv Oblast.

Historically, it was established on territory known as Ruthenian land. Earlier historical administrative units that became the territory of the oblast include the Kiev Voivodeship under the Polish–Lithuanian Commonwealth and Grand Duchy of Lithuania, and the Kiev Viceroyalty and Kiev Governorate under the Russian Empire. The northern part of the oblast belongs to the historical region of Polesia (Polissia).

In the Kyiv region, there was a specific folk icon-painting style much influenced by the Kyiv Pechersk Lavra painting school. Saints were depicted on a deep purple or black background, their clothes dark, their haloes dark blue, dark green or even black, outlined by thin white dotted contours. The Kyiv region's icons collection is part of the exhibition of the Museum of Ukrainian home icons in the Historical and cultural complex "The Radomysl Castle".

The current borders of the oblast were set following the Chernobyl disaster in 1986. Administrative oversight of the new city of Slavutych, which was constructed as part of the Chernihiv Oblast, was then transferred to the Kyiv Oblast (see Chernobyl zone below).

On 24 February 2022, the Russian Armed Forces invaded Kyiv Oblast as part of its Russian invasion of Ukraine. Ukraine launched a counter-offensive to retake the region in March 2022. The oblast was declared free of invaders on 2 April 2022 by the Ukrainian Deputy Minister of Defense Hanna Maliar. According to the Ukrainian Ministry of Defense its troops had retaken more than 30 towns and villages around Kyiv. However, on 9 April 2022 the Russians attacked the Oblast again, even destroying a railway station in Bucha.

== Geography ==
Kyiv Oblast has a total area of 28,100 km^{2} (10,849 sq mi) (approximately 35 times the area of Kyiv city) and is located in north-central Ukraine. On the west it borders the Zhytomyr Oblast, on the southwest – Vinnytsia Oblast, on the south – Cherkasy Oblast, on the southeast – Poltava Oblast, on the east and northeast – Chernihiv Oblast, and on the north – Homyel Voblasts of Belarus.

The oblast is equally split between both banks of the Dnieper River (Dnipro) north and south of Kyiv. Other significant rivers in the oblast are the Dnieper's tributaries: Pripyat (Prypiat) (R), Desna (L), Teteriv (R), Irpin' (R), Ros' (R) and Trubizh (L).

The length of the Dnipro River within the boundaries of the oblast totals 246 km (153 mi). The oblast has a total number of 177 rivers intersecting the region; 13 reservoirs (the most notable ones being Kyiv Reservoir and the Kaniv Reservoir), over 2000 ponds, and approximately 750 small lakes.

=== Climate ===
The climate of Kyiv Oblast is characteristic of the Polesia area and other neighboring forested areas. The oblast has a moderately continental climate with relatively mild winters and warm summers. The temperatures range from −6.1 °C (21.0 °F) in January to 19.2 °C (66.6 °F) degrees in July.

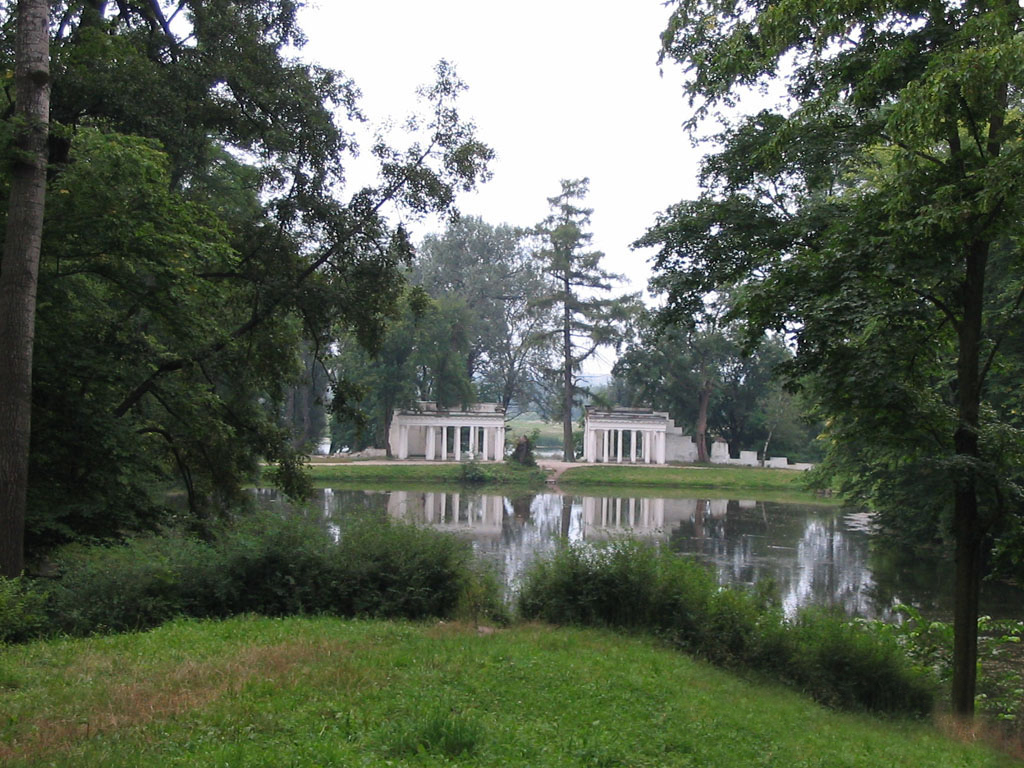
View of the historical landscape park "Oleksandriya" in the city of Bila Tserkva.

=== Vegetation ===
Kyiv Oblast has small mountains and slopes on the right bank of the Dnieper River. This entire area is surrounded by a continuous belt by greenery and forests. The oblast's "green area" covers 436 km^{2} (168 sq mi), characterized by 250 different sorts of trees and bushes.

== Demographics ==
Historical population
Year	Pop.	±%
1970	1,834,021	—
1979	1,923,905	+4.9%
1989	1,939,973	+0.8%
2001	1,827,894	−5.8%
2011	1,717,649	−6.0%
2022	1,795,079	+4.5%

According to the 2001 Ukrainian census, ethnic Ukrainians accounted for 92.5% of the population of Kyiv Oblast, and ethnic Russians for 6.0%.

The current estimated population (excluding Kyiv) is around 1.72 million (as of 2013). The population density is 63.01/km^{2}.

The urban population, according to the 2001 Ukrainian Census data, accounted for 1,053,500 people, or 57.6%, and the rural population – for 774,400 people, or 42.4%.

According to the data, the number of men accounted for 845,900 people, or 46.3%, that of women – 982,000 people, or 53.7%.

=== Language ===
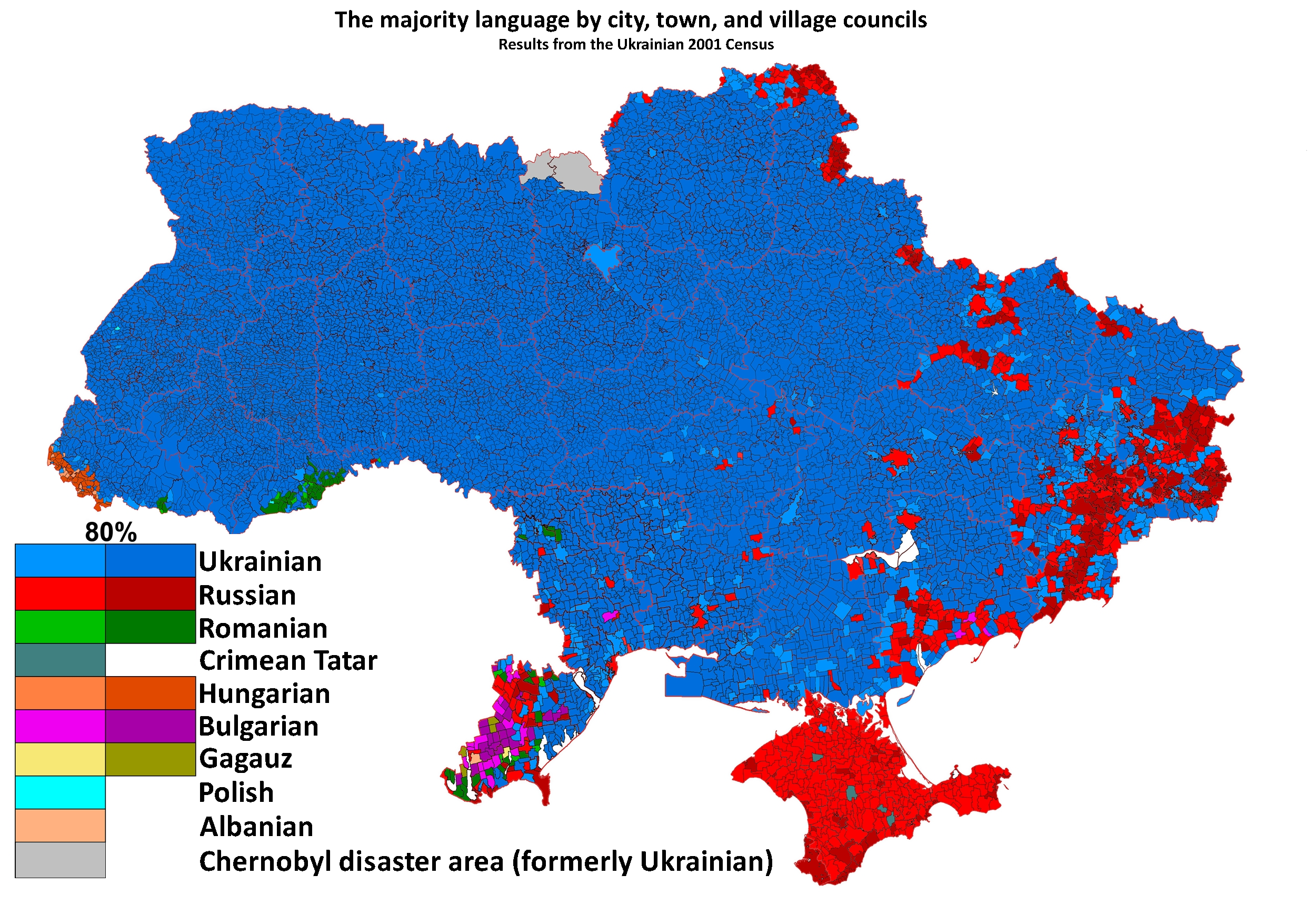
According to the 2001 Ukrainian census, Ukrainian was the native language for over 92% of Kyiv Oblast's population: it was the dominant language in all of the city, town, and village councils of the oblast.

Due to the Russification of Ukraine during the Soviet era, the share of Ukrainian speakers in the population of Kyiv Oblast gradually decreased, while the share of Russian speakers increased. Native language of the population of Kyiv Oblast according to the results of population censuses:

	1959	1970	1989	2001
Ukrainian	92.5%	91.9%	88.4%	92.3%
Russian	6.5%	7.5%	10.9%	7.2%
Other	1.0%	0.6%	0.7%	0.5%

Native language of the population of the raions, cities and city councils of Kyiv Oblast according to the 2001 Ukrainian census:

	Ukrainian	Russian
Kyiv Oblast	92.3%	7.2%
City of Bila Tserkva	86.6%	12.3%
City of Berezan	92.1%	7.5%
Boryspil (city council)	88.4%	11.1%
City of Brovary	86.4%	12.9%
City of Vasylkiv	87.3%	12.2%
Irpin (city council)	87.8%	11.6%
City of Pereiaslav-Khmelnytskyi	95.9%	3.6%
City of Fastiv	90.8%	8.6%
City of Rzhyshchiv	95.1%	4.3%
City of Slavutych	55.4%	42.6%
Baryshivka Raion	96.5%	3.0%
Bila Tserkva Raion (in pre-2020 borders)	95.7%	4.0%
Bohuslav Raion	97.6%	2.2%
Boryspil Raion (in pre-2020 borders)	95.7%	3.8%
Borodianka Raion	94.7%	4.8%
Brovary Raion (in pre-2020 borders)	96.9%	2.8%
Vasylkiv Raion	95.4%	4.2%
Volodarka Raion	97.8%	1.9%
Vyshhorod Raion (in pre-2020 borders)	90.3%	9.3%
Zghurivka Raion	97.0%	2.3%
Ivankiv Raion	96.5%	3.1%
Kaharlyk Raion	97.0%	2.7%
Kyiv-Sviatoshyn Raion	91.4%	8.1%
Makariv Raion	95.7%	3.8%
Myronivka Raion	96.7%	3.0%
Obukhiv Raion (in pre-2020 borders)	87.3%	12.2%
Pereiaslav-Khmelnytskyi Raion	97.1%	2.6%
Poliske Raion	97.2%	2.2%
Rokytne Raion	98.0%	1.8%
Skvyra Raion	97.4%	1.9%
Stavyshche Raion	98.3%	1.4%
Tarashcha Raion	97.9%	1.7%
Tetiiv Raion	98.2%	1.5%
Fastiv Raion (in pre-2020 borders)	96.2%	3.3%
Yahotyn Raion	96.1%	3.5%

Ukrainian is the only official language on the whole territory of Kyiv Oblast.

According to a poll conducted by Rating from 16 November to 10 December 2018 as part of the project «Portraits of Regions», 68% of the residents of Kyiv Oblast believed that the Ukrainian language should be the only state language on the entire territory of Ukraine. 9% believed that Ukrainian should be the only state language, while Russian should be the second official language in some regions of the country. 19% believed that Russian should become the second state language of the country. 4% found it difficult to answer.

On 21 March 2023, Kyiv Oblast Council approved the «Programme for the Development and Functioning of the Ukrainian Language as the State Language in All Spheres of Public Life in the Kyiv Oblast for 2023—2025», the main objectives of which are to strengthen the positions of the Ukrainian language in various spheres of public life in the oblast and to Ukrainianize the refugees from other regions of Ukraine.

According to the research of the Content Analysis Centre, conducted from 15 August to 15 September 2024, the topic of which was the ratio of Ukrainian and Russian languages in the Ukrainian segment of social media, 87.2% of posts from Kyiv Oblast were written in Ukrainian (83.6% in 2023, 75.9% in 2022, 29.3% in 2020), while 12.8% were written in Russian (16.4% in 2023, 24.1% in 2022, 70.7% in 2020).

After Ukraine declared independence in 1991, Kyiv Oblast, as well as Ukraine as a whole, experienced a gradual Ukrainization of the education system, which had been Russified during the Soviet era. Dynamics of the ratio of the languages of instruction in general secondary education institutions in Kyiv Oblast:

Language of instruction, % of pupils	1991— 1992	1992— 1993	1993— 1994	1994— 1995	1995— 1996	2000— 2001	2005— 2006	2007— 2008	2010— 2011	2012— 2013	2015— 2016	2018— 2019	2021— 2022	2022— 2023
Ukrainian	84.6%	86.7%	89.7%	91.1%	92.0%	97.0%	99.0%	99.0%	99.0%	99.0%	99.4%	99.7%	99.95%	100.0%
Russian	15.4%	13.3%	10.3%	8.9%	8.0%	3.0%	1.0%	1.0%	1.0%	1.0%	0.6%	0.3%	0.05%	—

According to the State Statistics Service of Ukraine, in the 2023—2024 school year, all 237,624 pupils in general secondary education institutions in Kyiv Oblast were studying in classes where Ukrainian was the language of instruction.

=== Age structure ===
0–14 years: 14.9% ▲ (male 132,559/female 123,816)
15–64 years: 69.8% ▼ (male 576,559/female 621,753)
65 years and over: 15.3% ▼ (male 84,026/female 177,360) (2013 official)

=== Median age ===
total: 39.7 years
male: 36.3 years
female: 43.0 years ▼ (2013 official)

=== Age structure of Kyiv City ===
0–14 years: 14.1% ▲ (male 203,453/female 192,111)
15–64 years: 73.3% ▼ (male 962,391/female 1,093,183)
65 years and over: 12.6% ▲ (male 129,293/female 223,285) (2013 official)

=== Median age of Kyiv City ===
total: 37.6 years ▲
male: 35.4 years ▲
female: 39.9 years ▲ (2013 official)

== Points of interest ==
The following historic-cultural sites were nominated for the Seven Wonders of Ukraine.

- Pereiaslav museum of folk architecture
- Liutych platzdarm
- Ivan Kozlovsky villa
- Dobranychivka settlement
- Saint Pokrov Church (Parkhomivka)
- Museum-villa of Kateryna Bilokur
- Landscape garden Oleksandria

== Administrative divisions ==
The oblast is divided into 7 raions, which are further divided into 69 hromadas.

Flag	Coat of arms	Name	Ukrainian Name	Administrative center	Area (km^{2})	Population estimate 2021
		Bila Tserkva Raion	Білоцерківський район	Bila Tserkva	6,514.8	436,115
		Boryspil Raion	Бориспільський район	Boryspil	3,873.2	203,273
		Brovary Raion	Броварський район	Brovary	2,881.9	242,180
–	–	Bucha Raion	Бучанський район	Bucha	2,558.3	362,382
		Fastiv Raion	Фастівський район	Fastiv	1,761.2	183,794
		Obukhiv Raion	Обухівський район	Obukhiv	3,639.1	228,829
		Vyshhorod Raion	Вишгородський район	Vyshhorod	4,333.0	131,957
		Total Oblast	Київська область	Kyiv	28,131	1,788,530

- The area of Vyshhorod Raion does not account for the Chernobyl exclusion zone (2,600 km^{2}).

Before the July 2020 reform, the oblast was subdivided into 25 raions (administrative districts). It consisted of 26 cities, 30 towns, and more than 1,000 villages.

The following data incorporates the number of each type of administrative divisions of Kyiv Oblast:

- Administrative Center – 1 (Kyiv);
- Raions – 25;
- Settlements – 1183, including:
  - Villages – 1127;
  - Cities/Towns – 56, including:
    - Urban-type settlements – 30;
    - Cities – 25, including:
      - Cities of oblast subordinance – 13;
      - Cities of raion subordinance – 14;
- Rural councils – 605.

As with other oblasts of Ukraine, the head of the Kyiv Oblast State Administration (governor) is appointed by the President of Ukraine and subordinated to the Cabinet of Ministers of Ukraine. Local self-government body is the popularly elected Kyiv Oblast Rada, chaired by a Speaker (elected from among the councilors).

=== The "exclaves" ===
The municipality of Slavutych is within the borders of the neighboring Chernihiv Oblast on the eastern bank of the Dnieper river and the municipality has no common border with the Kyiv Oblast. Still, Slavutych is administered by the Kyiv Oblast authorities (being a kind of administrative exclave).

Similarly, the town of Kotsiubynske, which is within the borders of Kyiv city (which is surrounded by the Kyiv Oblast), is administered by the Kotsiubynske Settlement Council.

=== Chernobyl zone ===
The north-western end of the oblast is a part of the Chernobyl Exclusion Zone due to the radioactive contamination caused by the Chernobyl nuclear reactor accident. The largest cities within zone are Chernobyl and Prypiat, which are now abandoned. The city of Slavutych was built outside of the zone to host evacuated residents of Prypyat and personnel of the zone installations.

=== Important cities and towns ===
Important cities and towns of Kyiv Oblast include:

- Bila Tserkva – important industrial center, historical city
- Brovary – important industrial center
- Boryspil – houses country's main international airport, industrial center
- Fastiv – important railway node, industrial center
- Irpin-Bucha-Hostomel-Vorzel^{[a]}
- Pereiaslav – historic tourist attraction
- Slavutych – Ukraine's youngest city, houses personnel of the Chernobyl Nuclear Power Plant
- Vasylkiv – industrial center, houses a major air base
- Vyshhorod – houses the Kyiv Hydroelectric Power Plant

Biggest settlements (population in thousands)

- Bila Tserkva – 200.1
- Brovary – 86.8
- Boryspil – 54.0 (not counting two subordinated villages)
- Fastiv – 52.0
- Irpin – 40.6 (not counting four subordinated towns)

=== Governors ===
1. Ivan Kapshtyk — as Presidential representative in Kyiv Oblast — 24 March 1992 — June 1994
2. Vasyl Sinko — 19 July 1995 — 21 September 1996
3. Anatoliy Zasukha — 22 September 1996 — 19 January 2005
4. Yevhen Zhovtyak — 4 February 2005 — 24 May 2006
  1. acting Valeriy Kondruk — 24 May — 16 June 2006
5. Vira Ulianchenko — 16 June 2006 — 20 May 2009
  1. acting Viktor Vakarsh — 20 May — 17 September 2009
6. Viktor Vakarsh — 17 September 2009 — 18 March 2010
7. Anatoliy Prysyazhnyuk — 18 March 2010 — 2 March 2014
8. Volodymyr Shandra — 2 March 2014 — 3 February 2016
9. Maksym Melnychuk — 3 February — 9 September 2016
10. Oleksandr Horhan — 28 October 2016 — 30 October 2018
11. Oleksandr Tereshchuk — 30 October 2018 — 11 June 2019
  1. interim acting Vyacheslav Kucher — 11 June 2019 — 9 July 2019
12. Mykhailo Bno-Airiyan — з 10 July 2019 — 28 October 2019
13. Oleksiy Chernyshov — 28 October 2019 — 4 March 2020
14. Vasyl Volodin — 11 March 2020 — 8 February 2022
15. Oleksiy Kuleba — 8 February 2022 — 15 March 2022
16. Oleksandr Pavlyuk — 15 March — 21 May 2022
17. Oleksiy Kuleba — 21 May 2022 — 24 January 2023
  1. interim acting Dmytro Nazarenko — 25 January 2023 — 10 April 2023

== Economy ==
=== Industry ===
Kyiv Oblast's main industry's include: power production, food, chemical and petrochemical industries, mechanical engineering and metal-working. The national share of tire production for automobiles constitutes – 63%, excavators – 53%, paper and cardboard – 40%, hoisting cranes – 39%. In general, the oblast has 330 licensed industrial enterprises and 742 smaller industrial enterprises. The Boryspil Bus Plant in Prolisky produces 1,700 buses per year of various modifications, and several other auto-industry factories are also located in the oblast'.

=== Agriculture ===
In addition to industry, the oblast also has a developed agriculture production. In 1999, the gross grain yield in the region was about 1,118,600 tons, sugar-beets – 1,570,900 tons, sunflower seeds – 18,1 thousand tons, potatoes – 669,200 tons. The region also produced 156,900 tons of meat, 738,500 tons of milk and 855,2 million eggs. At the beginning of 1999, there were 1,130 registered farms within the oblast.

=== Transportation ===
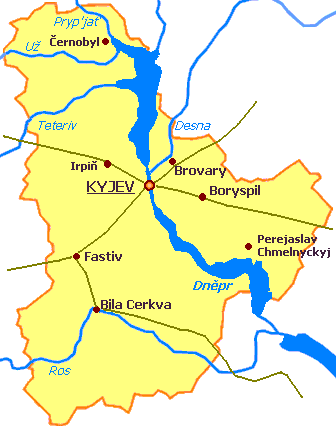
Simplified map of the major railway lines in Kyiv Oblast.

Kyiv Oblast has a highly developed rail transport system. The total length of the oblast's working railway lines is 88 km (as of 1985). Through the territory of the oblast pass the: Moscow—Kyiv—Lviv, Kyiv—Dnipro—Donetsk and other railway routes. In addition to inter-Ukraine and international rail routes, local Elektrychka lines also pass through the oblast: Kyiv—Fastiv—Koziatyn, Kyiv—Fastiv—Myronivka, Kyiv—Teteriv, Kyiv—Nizhyn, and Kyiv—Yahotyn.

The length of the oblast's roads totals 7,760 km, including 7,489 km of paved roads. The main roads passing thorough the oblast include:

- Saint Petersburg—Kyiv—Odesa (M-01/M-05 route)
- Kyiv-Kovel-Lublin (M-07 route)
- Voronezh—Kharkiv-Kyiv-Lviv-Kraków (E-40, M-06/M03 route)
- Luhansk-Dnipro-Kyiv (M-04 route)

The oblast's main airports include two international airports: the Boryspil Airport and the Hostomel (Antonov) Cargo Airport. Ukrainian military airbases are located in the cities of Bila Tserkva and Uzyn.

Strategic gas-pipelines in the oblast include Urengoy–Pomary–Uzhhorod pipeline, and Shebelynka—Poltava—Kyiv.

== Education ==
Kyiv Oblast has 795 state-run schools of general education, 219 (27.5%) of which are situated in urban areas and 576 (72.5%) of which – in rural areas. These schools are attended by 232,260 students, 141,416 (60.6%) which attend urban schools, and 98,944 (39.4%) which attend rural area schools. In addition, there are 12 evening schools with an enrollment of over 6,000 students, 15 private institutions teaching about 7,000 students, 23 vocational schools teaching over 14,300 students, 22 higher schools with an enrollment of over 34,900 students), and 52 home-school institutions containing over 48,700 children. There are also 756 institutions of pre-school education attended by a total of 44,400 children, 52 home-school institutions, 22 vocational institutions, having an enrollment of 17,300 students.

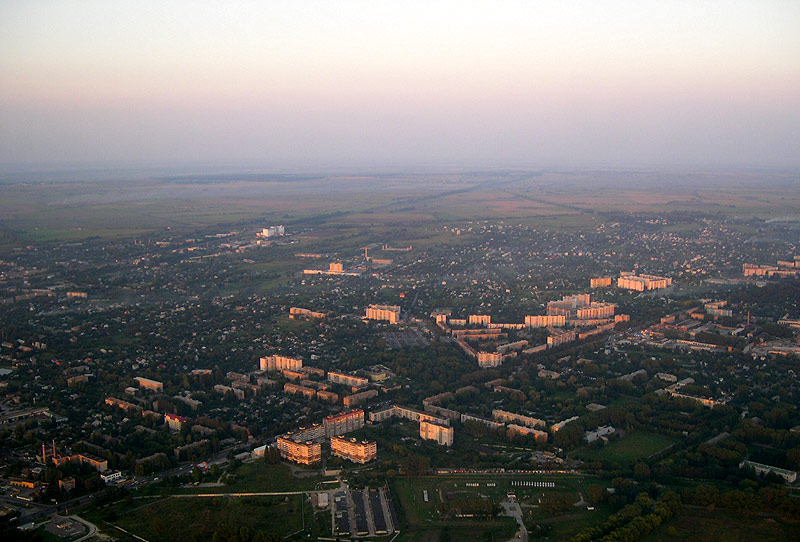
Aerial view of Boryspil, home of the Boryspil Airport from an airplane.

Also, educational institutions for orphans, physically and mentally disabled children represent an important component of Kyiv Oblast's educational system.

In addition to general education schools, the oblast has educational institutions specifically for gifted children, including:

- Fastiv Regional Natural and Mathematic School
- Kyiv Regional Lyceum of Physical Education and Sports
- Stritiv Higher Pedagogical School of Kobza Music
- Brovary Higher School of Physical Education (training ground for several world- and Olympic champions).

== Nomenclature ==
Most of Ukraine's oblasts are named after their capital cities, officially referred to as "oblast centers". The name of each oblast is a relative adjective, formed by adding a feminine suffix to the name of respective center city: Kyiv (in transliterated Ukrainian) is the center of the Kyivs’ka oblast' (Kyiv Oblast). Most oblasts are also sometimes referred to in a feminine noun form, following the convention of traditional regional place names, ending with the suffix "-shchyna", as is the case with the Kyiv Oblast, Kyivshchyna.

== Notes ==
a. These neighboring settlements are practically merged into a conurbation

== Gallery ==
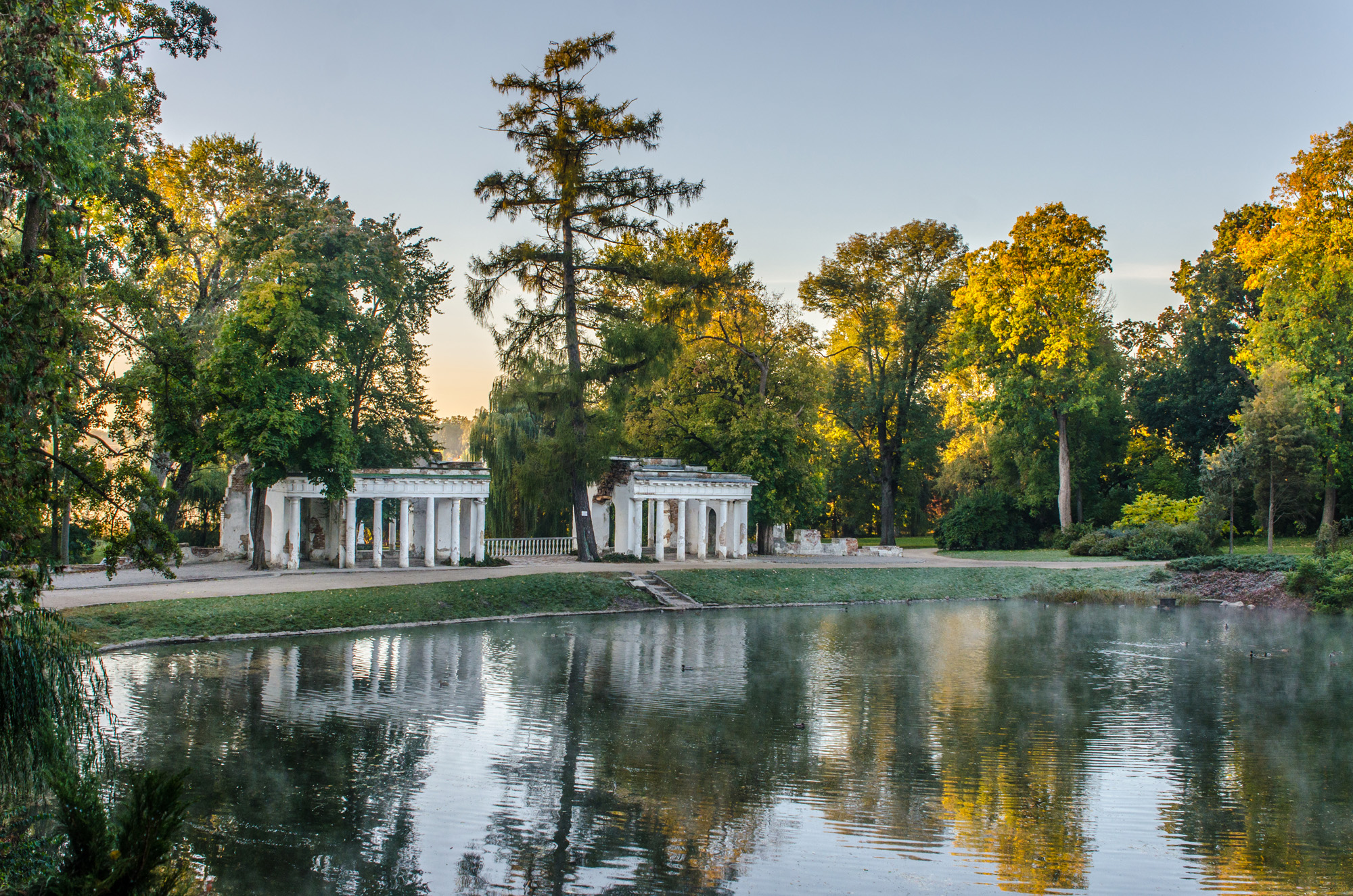
Arboretum Oleksandriya, Bila Tserkva

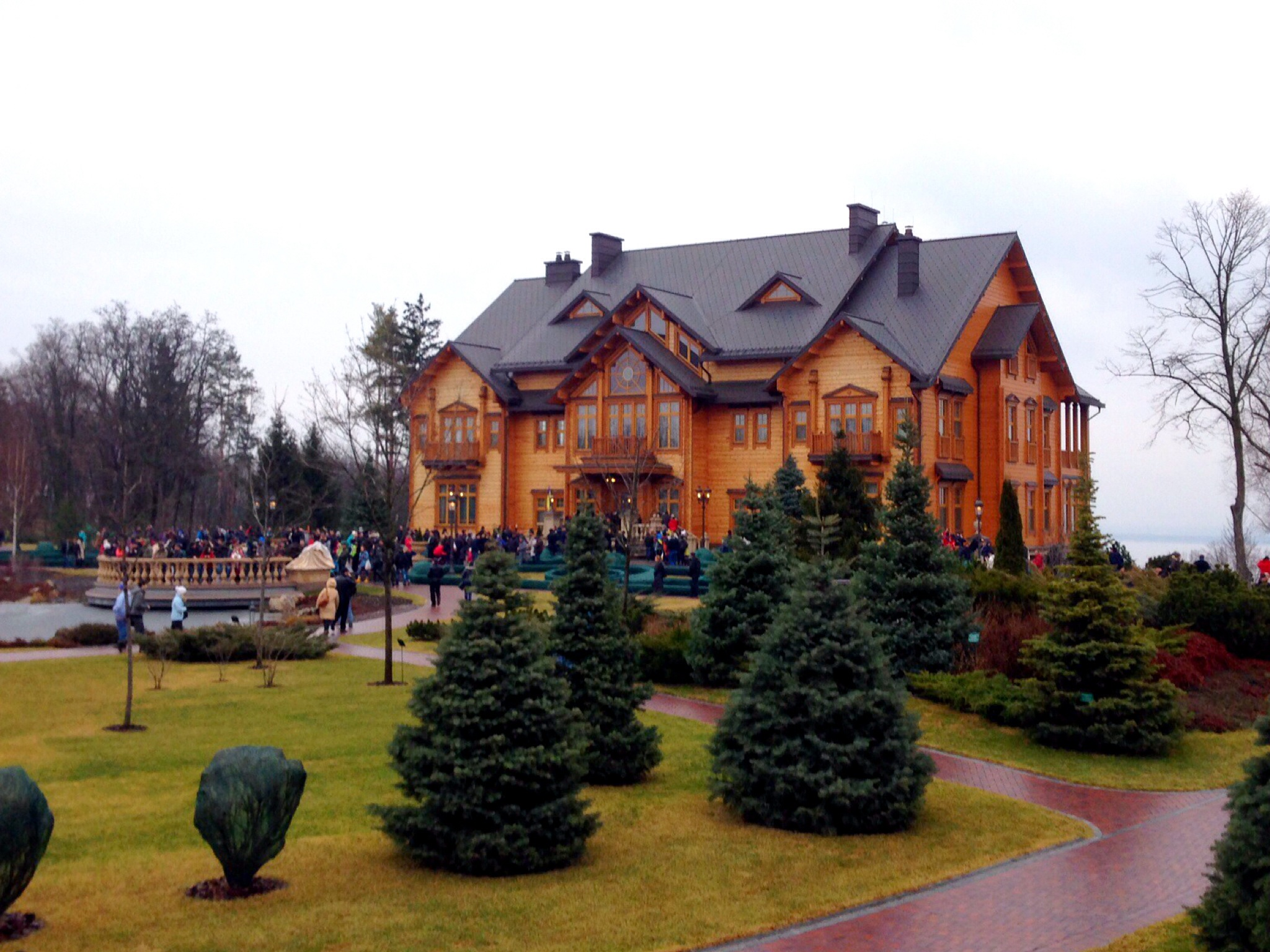
Mezhyhirya Residence

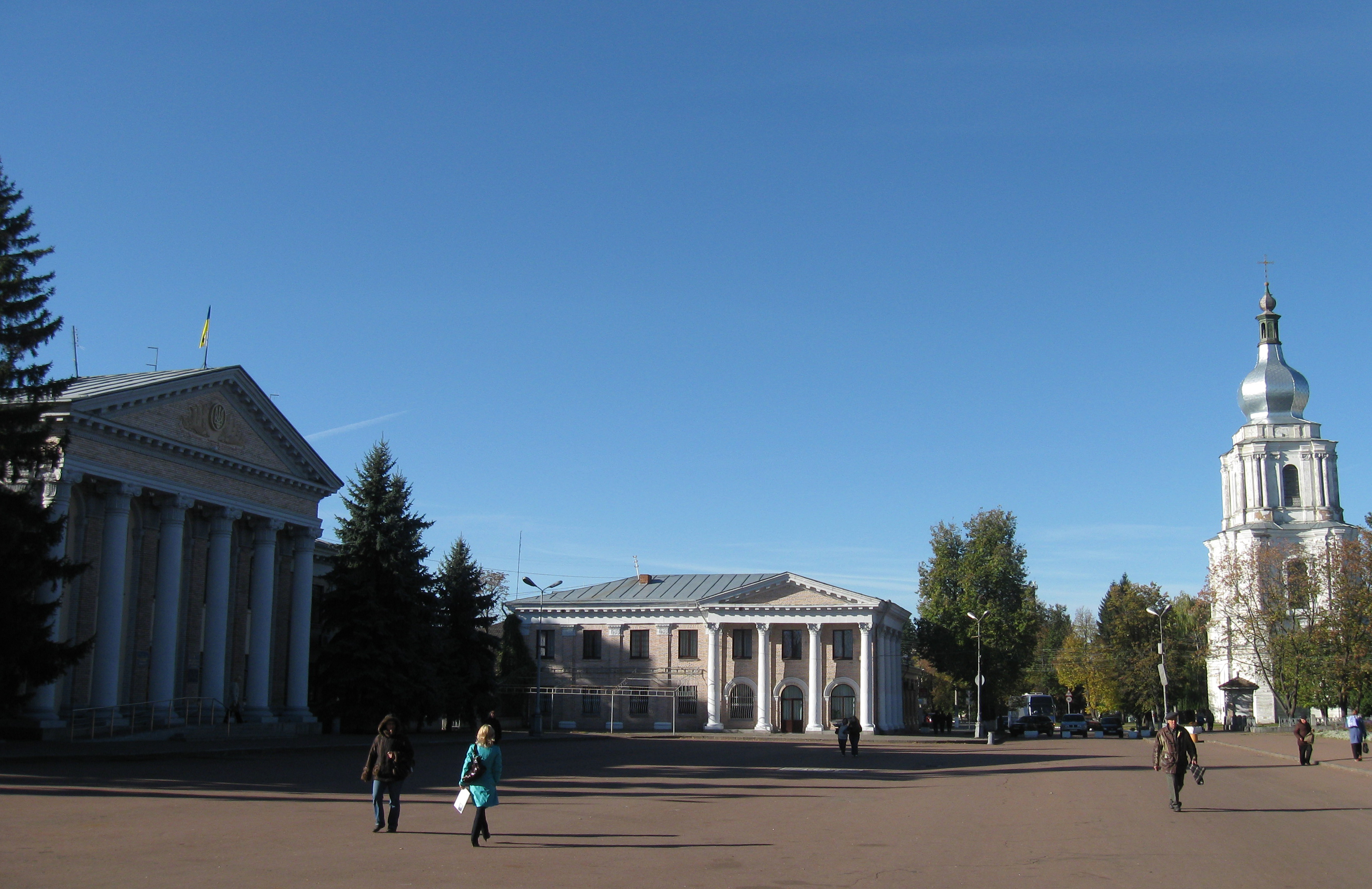
Bohdan Khmelnytsky Square, Pereiaslav

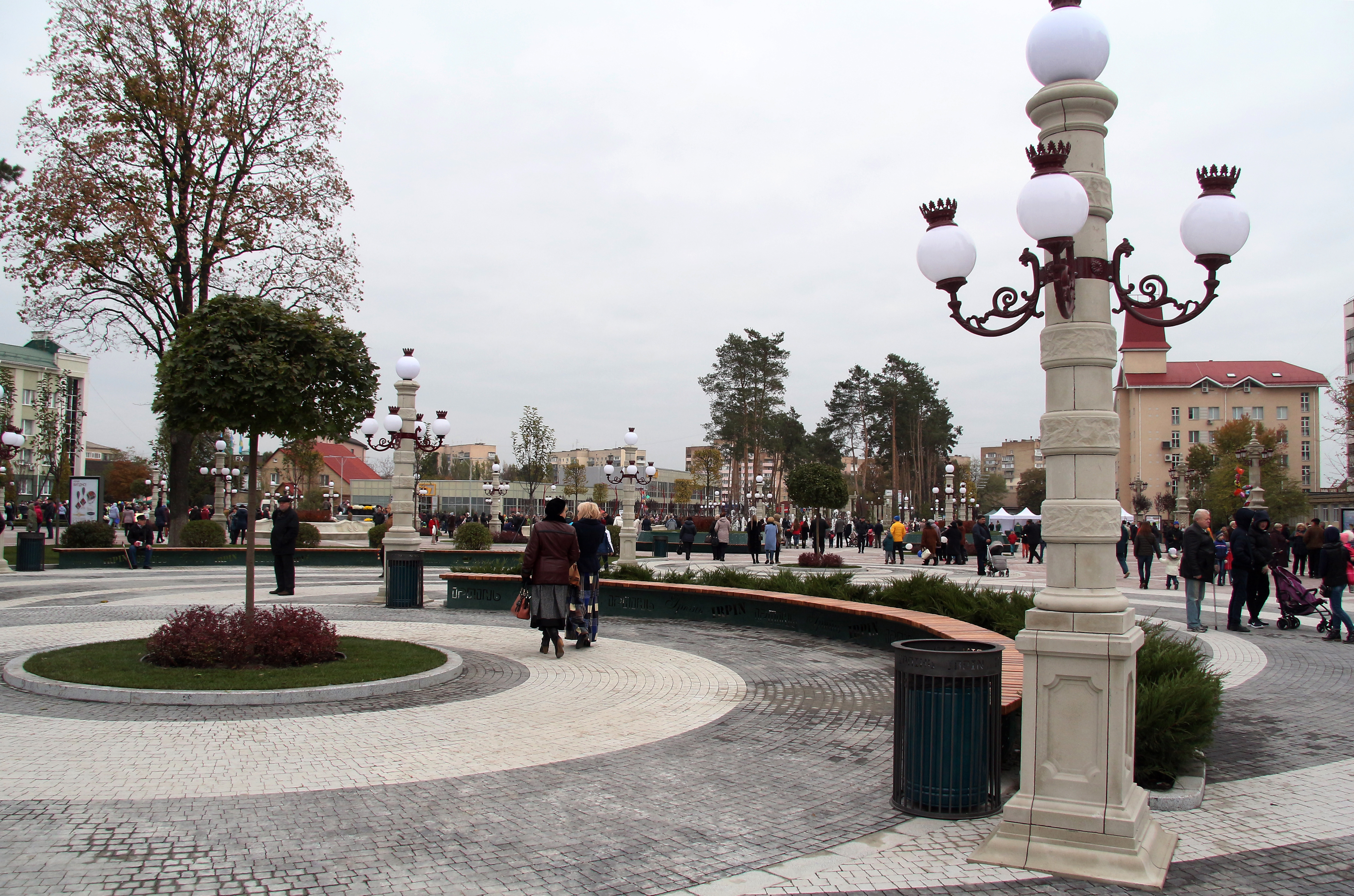
Central square, Irpin

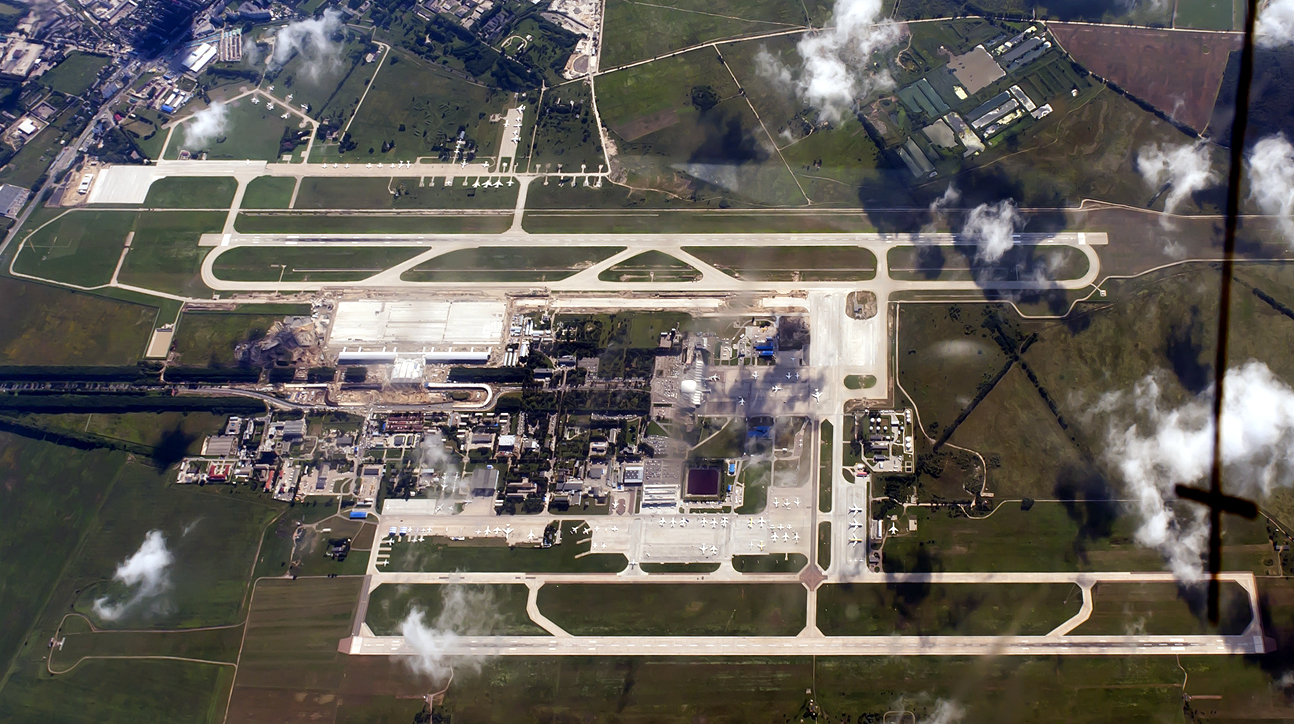
Boryspil International Airport

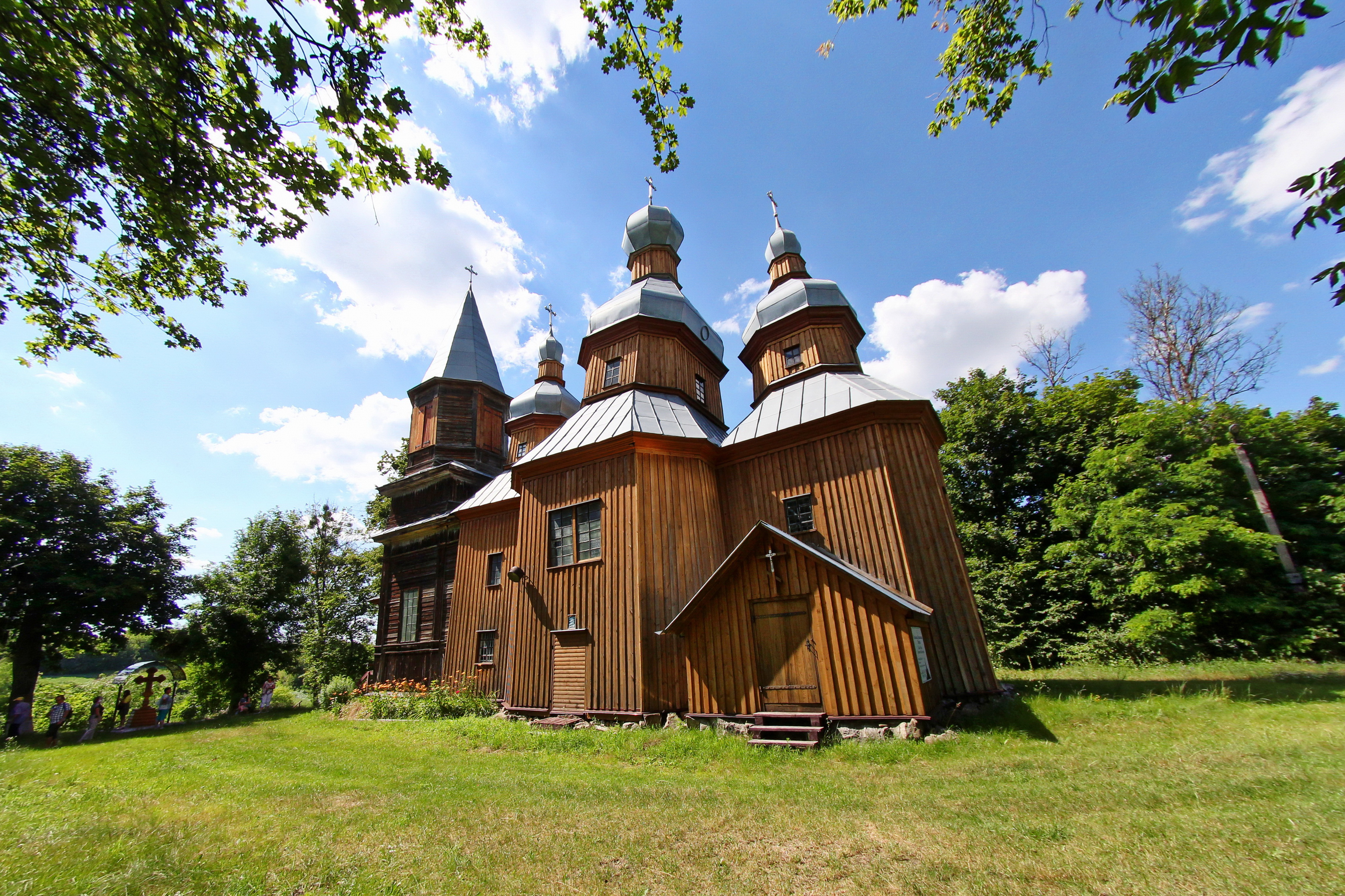
Church of the Nativity of Theotokos, Tulyntsi

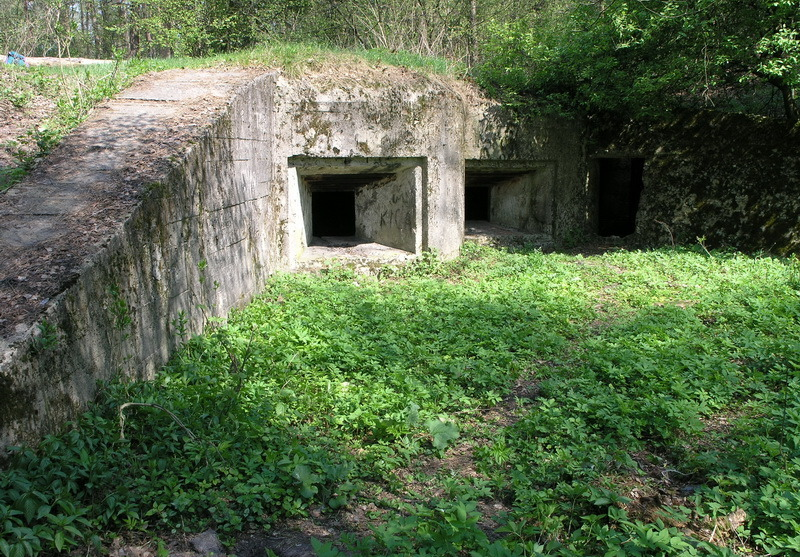
Pillbox 554, a part of the Kiev Fortified Region

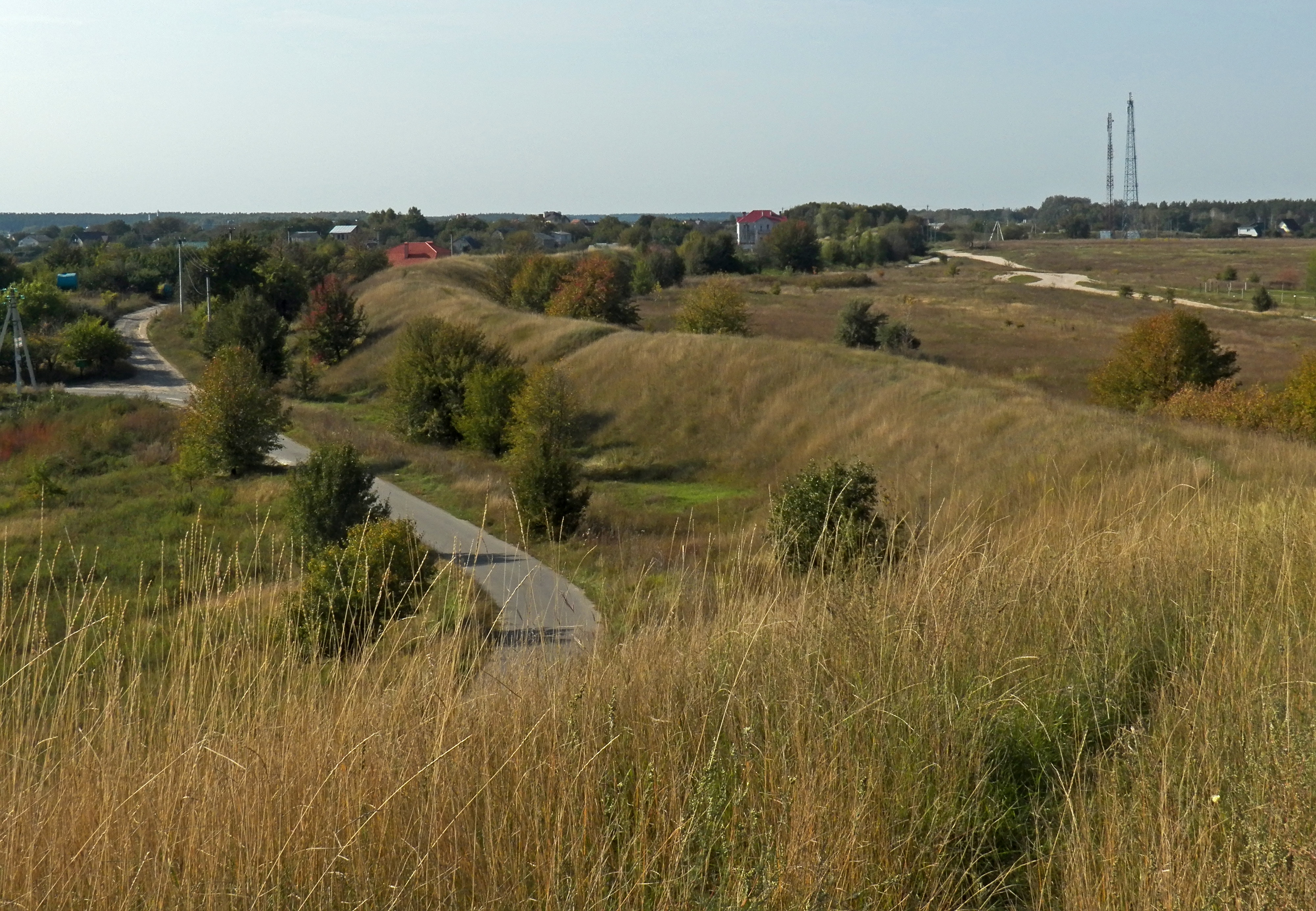
Serpent's Wall

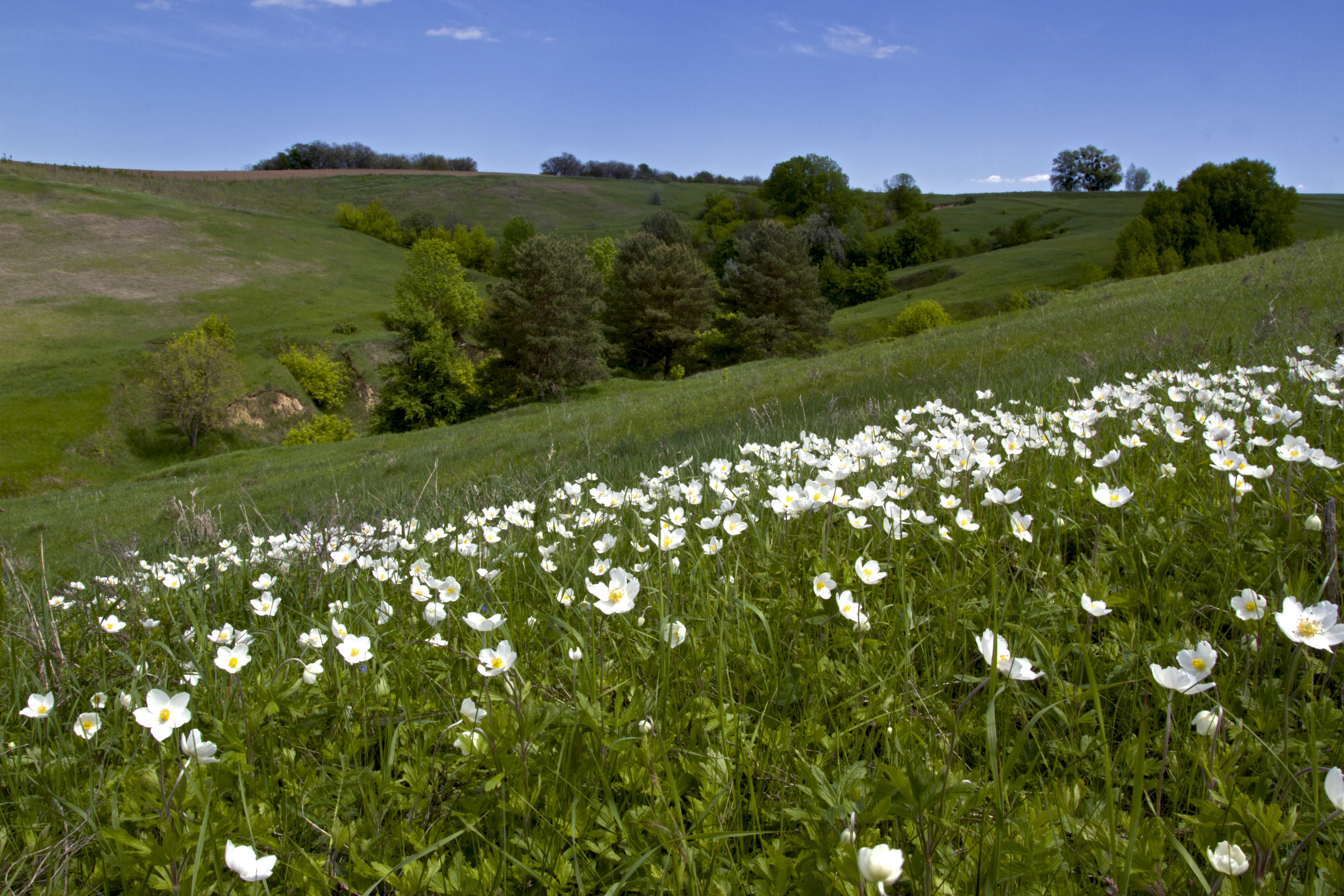
Rzhyshchiv Nature Reserve

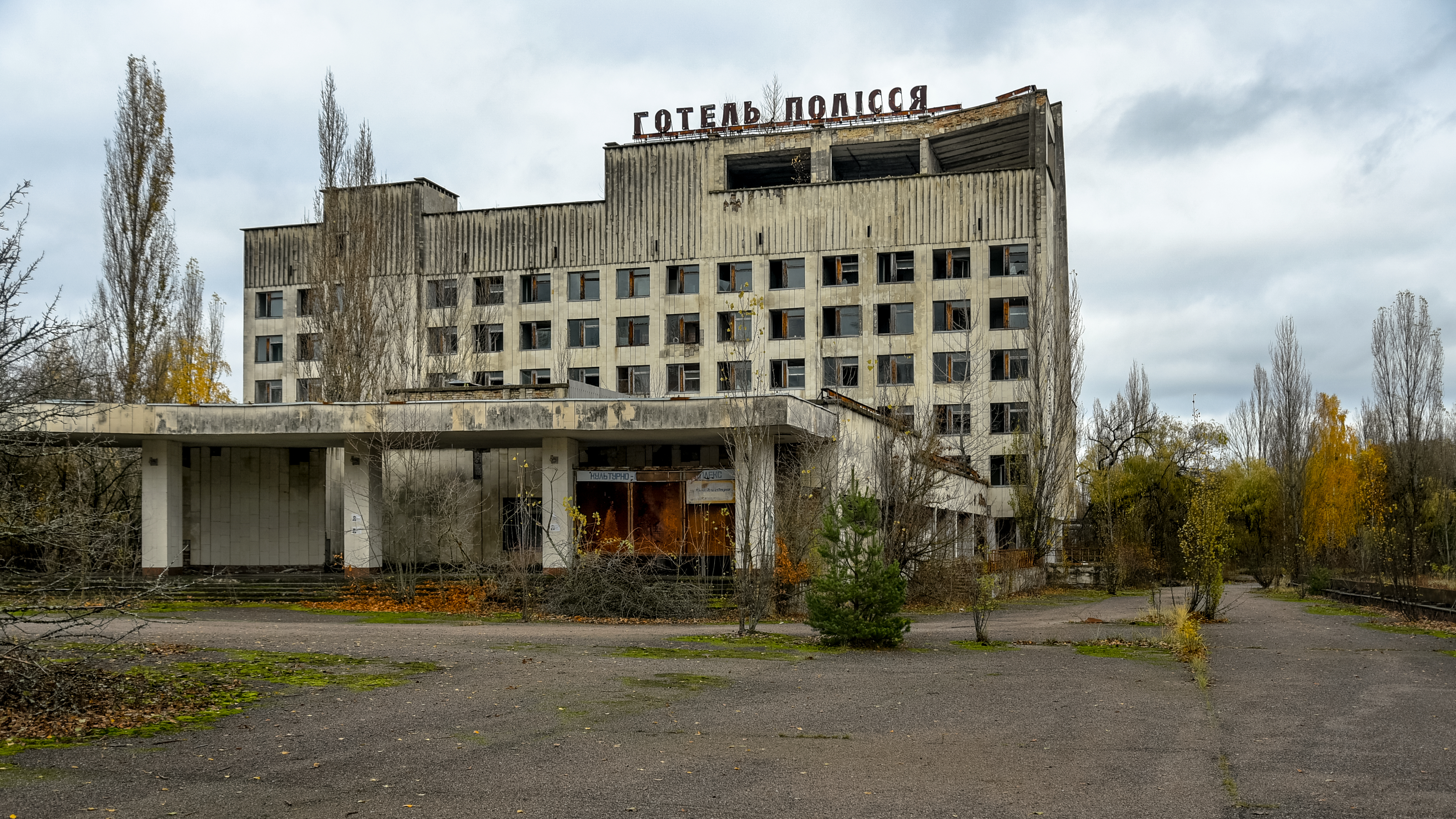
Hotel Polissia, Pripyat

== See also ==
- List of villages in Kyiv Oblast
- Subdivisions of Ukraine
