= Klavdiievo-Tarasove =

Rural locality in Kyiv Oblast, Ukraine

Klavdiievo-Tarasove Клавдієво-Тарасове
- Rural settlement
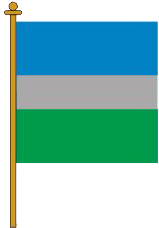
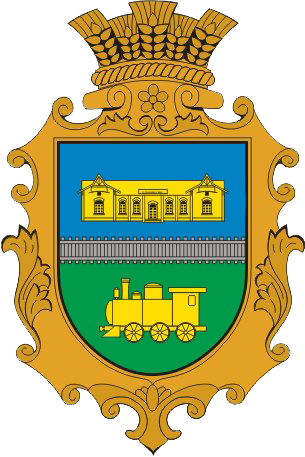
- Flag Coat of arms

- Location of Klavdiievo-Tarasove in Ukraine Klavdiievo-Tarasove (Ukraine)
- Coordinates: 50°34′57″N 30°00′19″E
- Country: Ukraine
- Oblast: Kyiv Oblast
- Raion: Bucha Raion
- Hromada: Nemishaieve settlement hromada
- Founded: 1903
- Town status: 1938

Government
  - Town Head: Oleksandr Dudnyk

Population (2001)
  - Total: 4,727
- Time zone: UTC+2 (EET)
  - Summer (DST): UTC+3 (EEST)
- Postal code: 07850—07851
- Area code: +380 4577
- Website: rada.gov.ua

Klavdiievo-Tarasove (Ukrainian: Клавдієво-Тарасове) is a rural settlement in Bucha Raion (district) of Kyiv Oblast (province) in the historical region of Polesia in northern Ukraine. It belongs to Nemishaieve settlement hromada, one of the hromadas of Ukraine. The population of the settlement was 6,178 as of the 2001 Ukrainian Census. Current population: 5,076 (2022 estimate). Its population was 4,727 as of the 2001 Ukrainian Census.

== History ==
Klavdiievo-Tarasove was founded in 1903 as a village, and it retained its village status until it was upgraded to that of an urban-type settlement in 1938.

The village of Klavdiievo was founded in 1903. Its emergence is associated with the start of construction of the Kyiv–Kovel railway. In 1900, construction work began simultaneously on all sections of the railway line. In 1902, the 45th verst crossing the future Klavdiieve station was built, to which a single-track line led. In 1908, after construction of the second track on the railway, as well as the opening of stations, the 39th verst and the 45th verst crossings were renamed Nemishayeve-I and Nemishayeve-II stations, respectively, in honor of the chief of the South-Western Railway Klavdii Nemishaev. With the expansion of postal and freight traffic, the inevitable confusion forced in 1913 to rename the station Nemishayeve-II to Klavdiievo station.

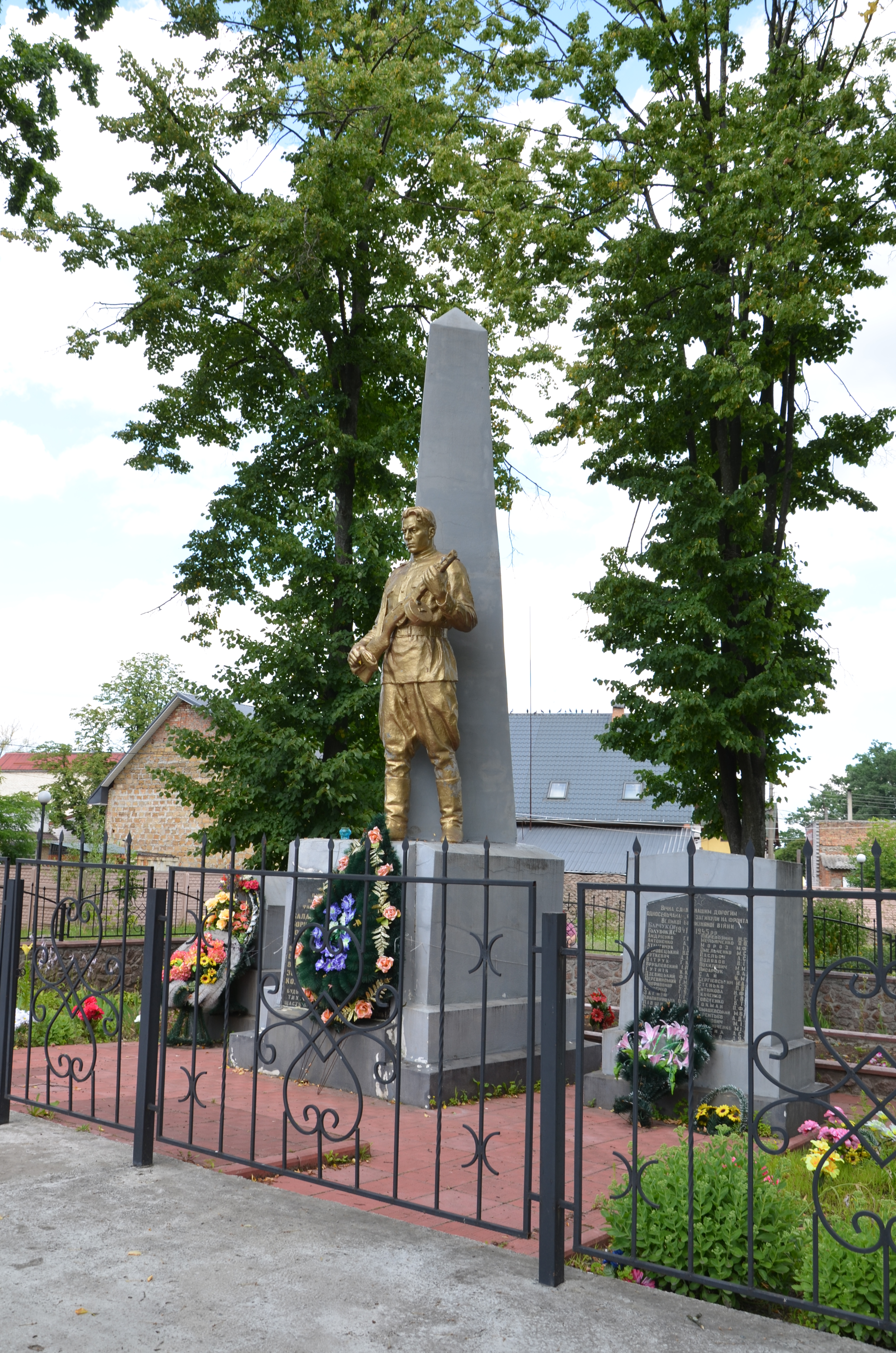
Mass grave of soldiers of the Soviet Army in Klavdiievo

In 1910, the hunting lodge of the Prime Minister of the Russian Empire Pyotr Stolypin was built in Klavdiievo.

After the October Revolution, the new government decided to erase the name of the tsar's minister from the names of the stations – Nemishayeve and Klavdiieve were renamed Shevchenkove station and Tarasove station, respectively. But the People's Commissariat did not approve the new names, and the old ones were returned to the stations. However, they decided to keep the name Tarasove for the village – so Klavdiievo-Tarasove appeared on the map.

The grave of Otaman Orlyk's insurgents and the Bolsheviks from 1921 has been preserved in the village.

In 1926, the village had 155 households, 176 estates, and 730 people.

In 1942–1943 a shadow organization headed by I.O. Polyakov operated here. In July 1943, the 1st Borodianka partisan detachment was formed in the forests near Klavdiievo-Tarasove, to which the locals provided great assistance. Partisan M.P. Makiychuk was killed in battles against the Nazis in the village. Now the stop at 53 km of the railway is called Makiychukove. 1,053 inhabitants of this village took part in the German-Soviet war; almost all of them were awarded orders and medals of the USSR.

Until 18 July 2020, Klavdiievo-Tarasove belonged to Borodianka Raion. The raion was abolished that day as part of the administrative reform of Ukraine, which reduced the number of raions of Kyiv Oblast to seven. The area of Borodianka Raion was merged into Bucha Raion.

The settlement was occupied by Russian troops for a time during the Kyiv offensive of the 2022 Russian invasion of Ukraine.

On 26 January 2024 this day, a new law entered into force which abolished the status of urban-type settlement, and Klavdiievo-Tarasove became a rural settlement.

== Economy ==
Klavdiievo-Tarasove is a centre of wood processing industry. A factory of Christmas decorations functions in the settlement.

== Notable people ==
- Valery Aleksandruk - Ukrainian diplomat. Ambassador of Ukraine to Nigeria.
- Mykola Matvienko - senior soldier of the reserve, gunner of the operational battalion of the Kyiv convoy brigade of the National Guard of Ukraine. Died in the ATO zone.
- Valentyn Nesin - paleoteriologist known in Ukraine and abroad.
- Vadym Pavlyuk - Ukrainian Soviet figure.
- Oleksandr Rybalko - Ukrainian source researcher, historian, editor, linguist, translator. Long-term author and editor of the magazine "Sights of Ukraine".
- Ihor Telyuk (1979—2017) - soldier of the Armed Forces of Ukraine, participant in the Russo-Ukrainian war.

== Gallery ==
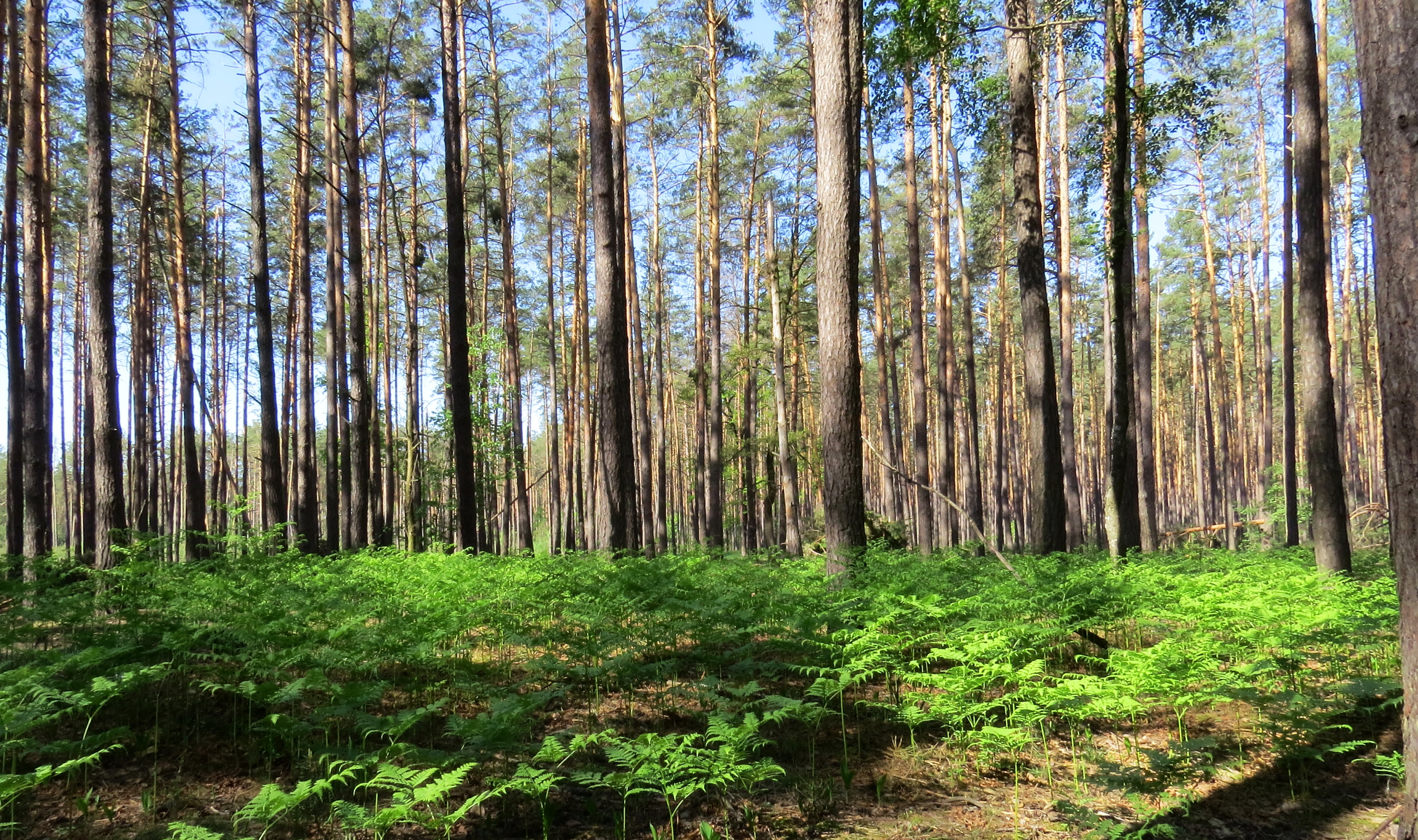
Forest near the village

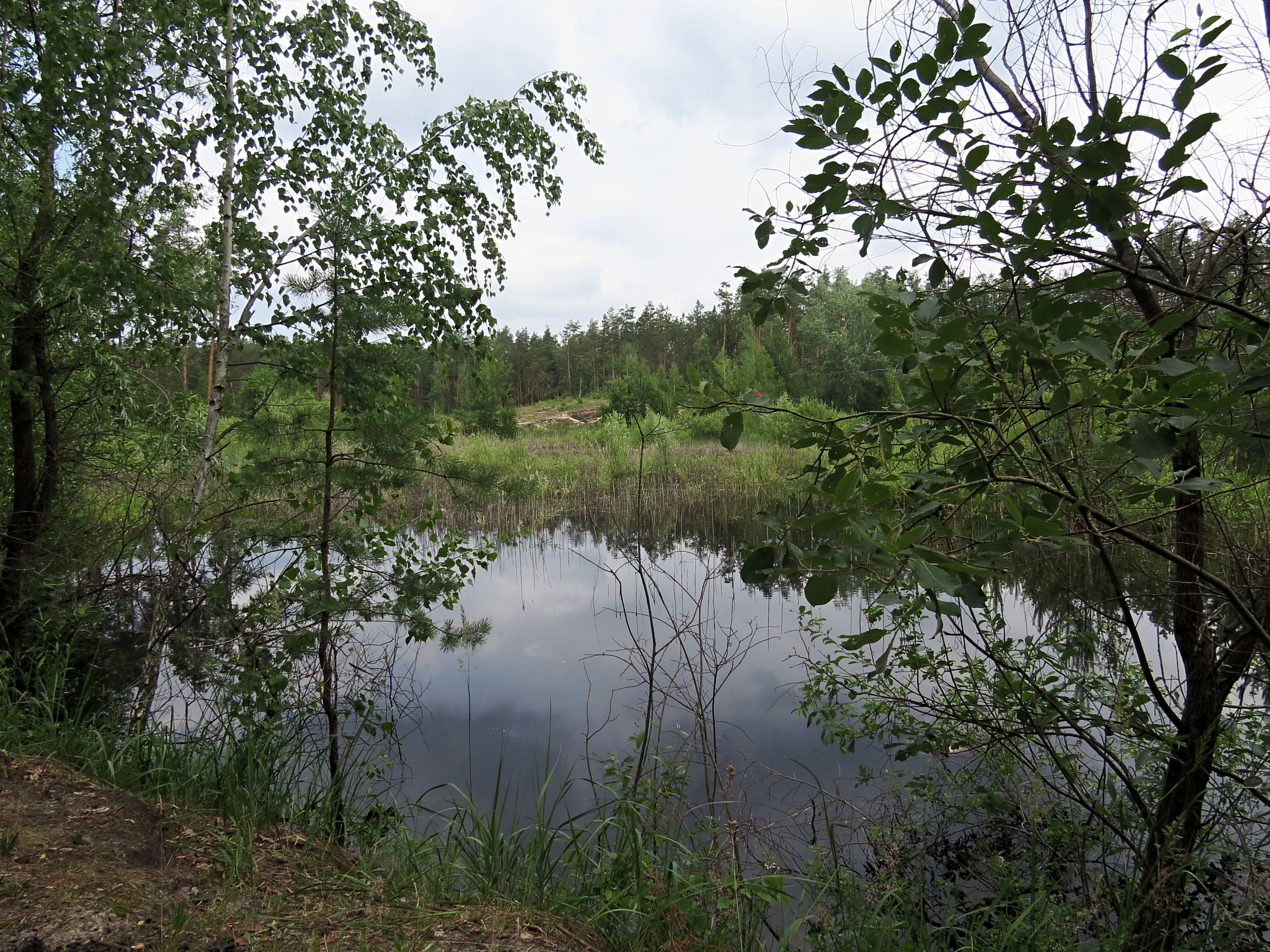
Lake near the village
