= Borodianka Raion =

Former subdivision of Kyiv Oblast, Ukraine

Borodianka Raion Бородянський район
- Raion
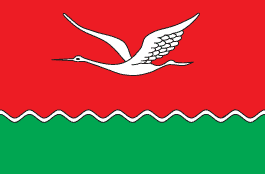
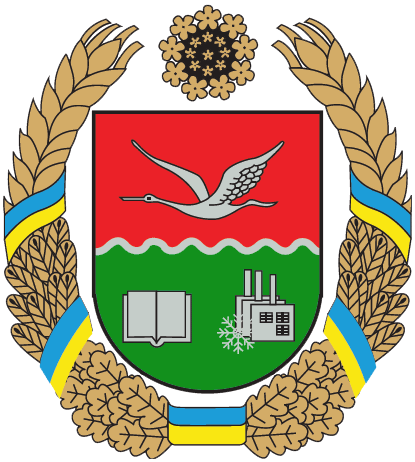
- Flag Coat of arms

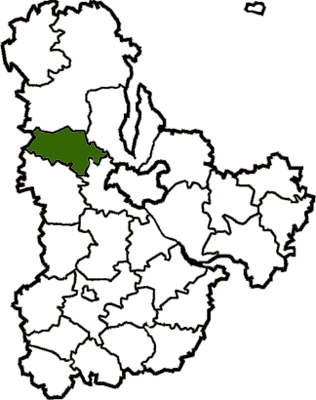
- Coordinates: 50°39′33″N 29°52′52″E
- Country: Ukraine
- Region: Kyiv Oblast
- Disestablished: 18 July 2020
- Admin. center: Borodianka
- Subdivisions: List: — city councils; — settlement councils; — rural councils; Number of localities: — cities; — urban-type settlements; 42 — villages; — rural settlements

Population (2020)
  - Total: 56,967
- Time zone: UTC+02:00 (EET)
  - Summer (DST): UTC+03:00 (EEST)
- Area code: +380

Borodianka Raion (Ukrainian: Бородянський район) was a raion (district) in Kyiv Oblast of Ukraine. Its administrative center was the urban-type settlement of Borodianka. The raion was abolished on 18 July 2020 as part of the administrative reform of Ukraine, which reduced the number of raions of Kyiv Oblast to seven. The area of Borodianka Raion was merged into the newly created Bucha Raion. The last estimate of the raion population was 56,967 (2020 est.).

== Subdivisions ==
At the time of disestablishment, the raion consisted of three hromadas,

- Borodianka settlement hromada with the administration in the urban-type settlement of Borodianka;
- Nemishaieve settlement hromada with the administration in the urban-type settlement of Nemishaieve;
- Piskivka settlement hromada with the administration in the urban-type settlement of Piskivka.
