= Bucha (village), Ukraine =

Rural locality in Kyiv Oblast, Ukraine

Bucha Буча
- Village
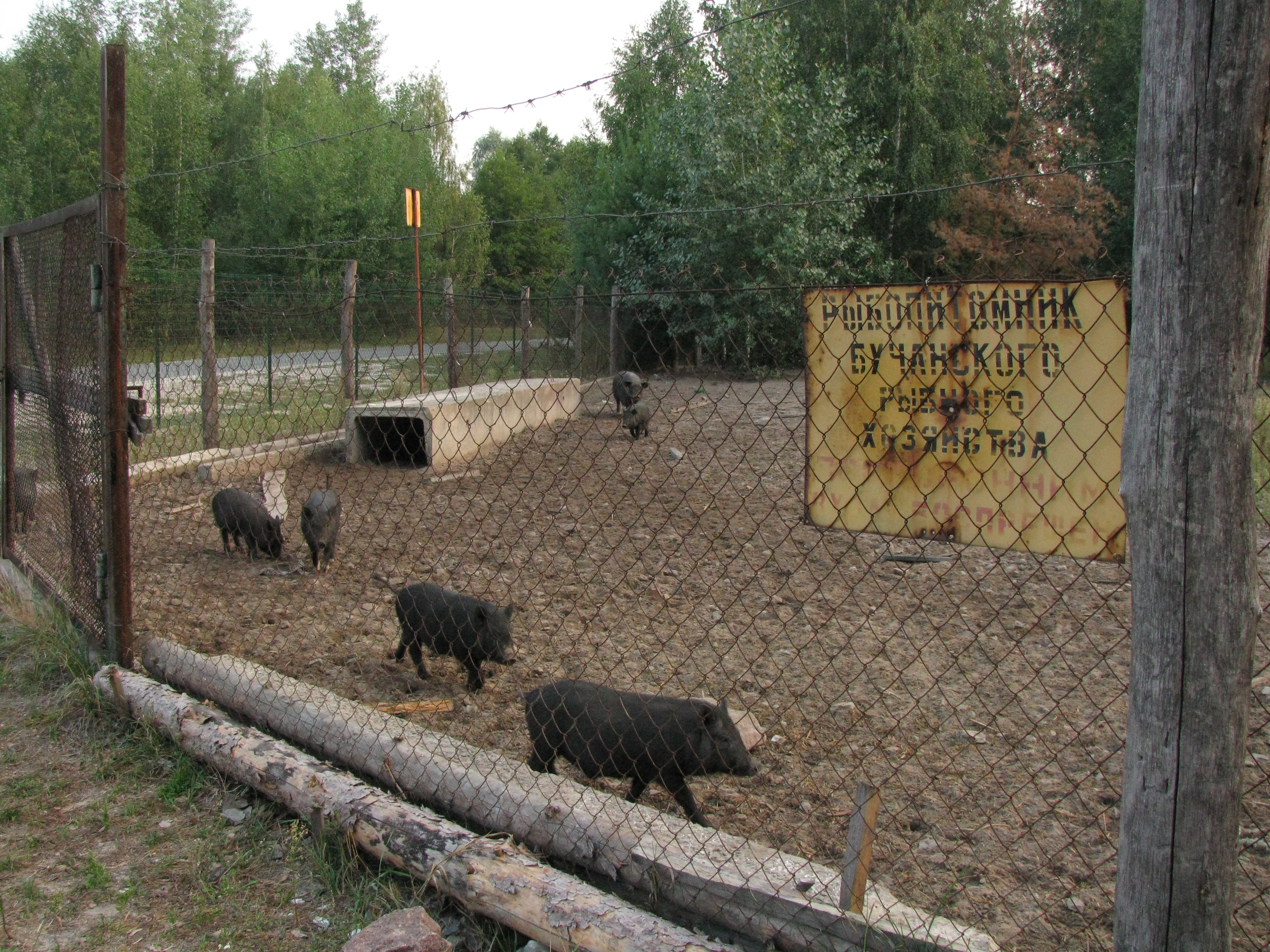
- Forestry in Bucha village

- Location within Kyiv Oblast Location within Ukraine
- Coordinates: 50°26′48″N 30°03′55″E
- Country: Ukraine
- Oblast: Kyiv Oblast
- Raion: Bucha Raion
- Hromada: Dmytrivka rural hromada

Area
  - Total: 26.57 km^{2} (10.26 sq mi)

Population (2001)
  - Total: 144
  - Density: 5.42/km^{2} (14.0/sq mi)
- Postal code: 08105
- Area code: +380 4598

Bucha (Ukrainian: Буча, pronounced [ˈbutʃɐ]) is a village in Bucha Raion of Kyiv Oblast, Ukraine. It belongs to Dmytrivka rural hromada, one of the hromadas of Ukraine.

== History ==
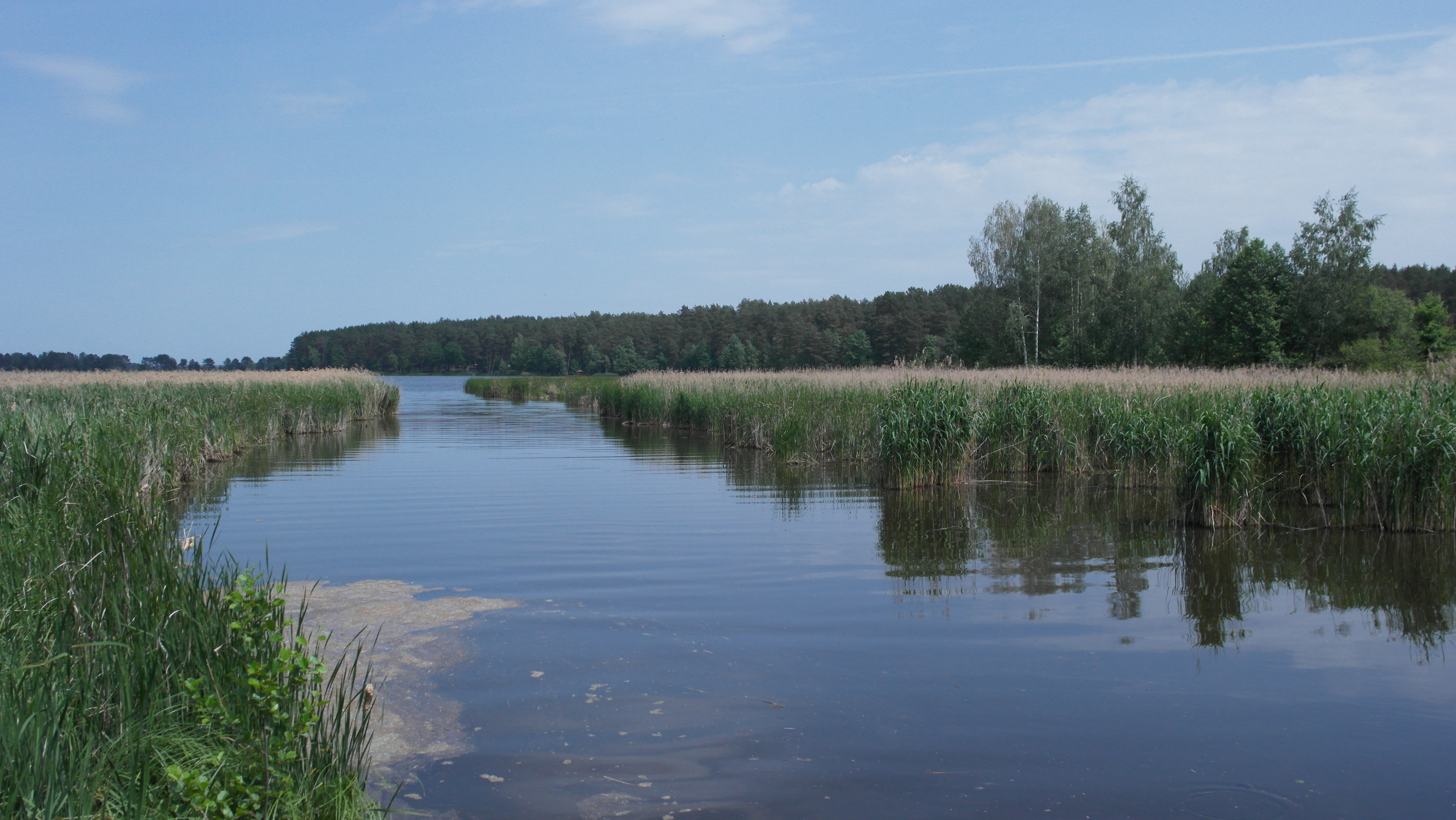
Bucha Reservoir

In 1900, Bucha was a state-owned khutir located in the Belogorodskaya Volost of Kievsky Uyezd of Kiev Governorate. It was located 31 miles from Kyiv, had 15 parishes, 4 yards and 20 residents. Bucha is also near the Kyiv–Zhytomyr highway, Boiarka railway station and Kyiv steamship station. There are 205 acres of land in the village, which belonged to landowner Ivan Matviyovych Musa.

Until 18 July 2020, Bucha was located in Kyiv-Sviatoshyn Raion. The raion was abolished that day as part of the administrative reform of Ukraine, which reduced the number of raions of Kyiv Oblast to seven. The area of Kyiv-Sviatoshyn Raion was split between Bucha, Fastiv, and Obukhiv raions, with Bucha being transferred to Bucha Raion.

== Demographics ==
Native language as of the Ukrainian Census of 2001:

- Ukrainian 92.36%
- Russian 7.64%
