= Kotsiubynske =

Rural locality in Kyiv Oblast, Ukraine

Kotsiubynske Коцюбинське
- Rural settlement
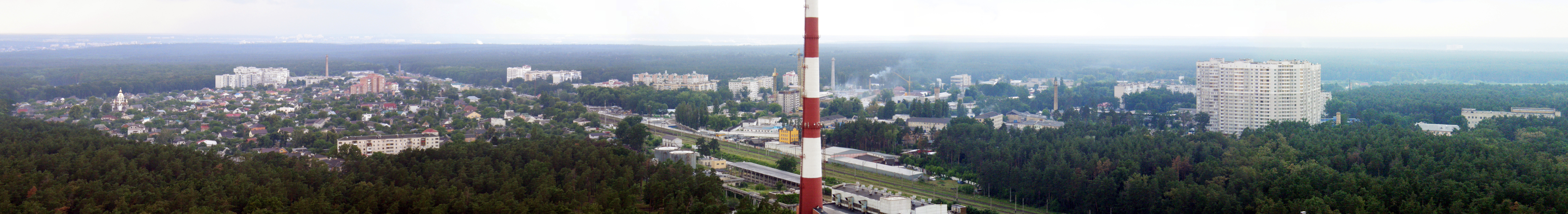

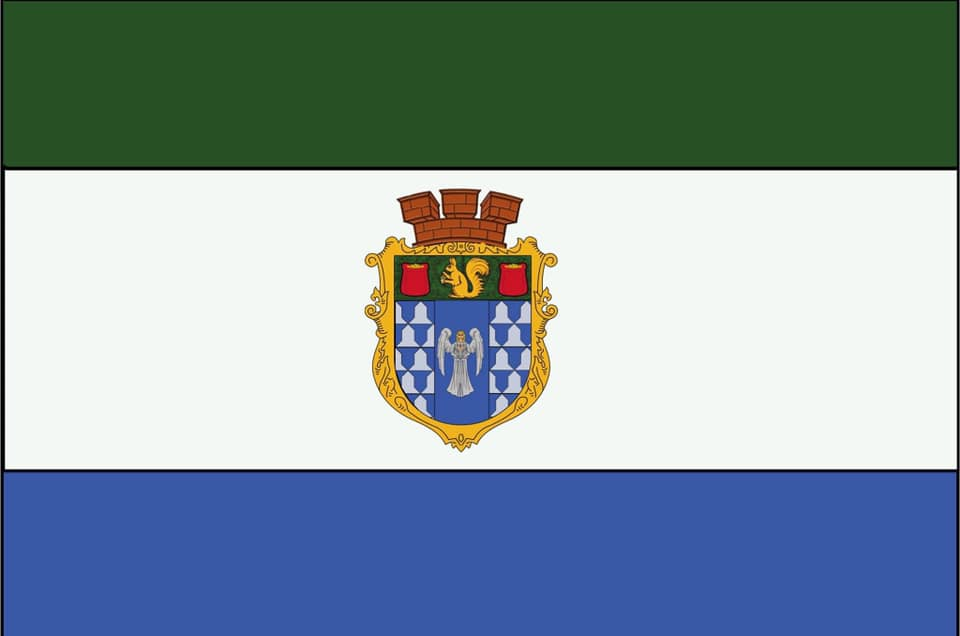
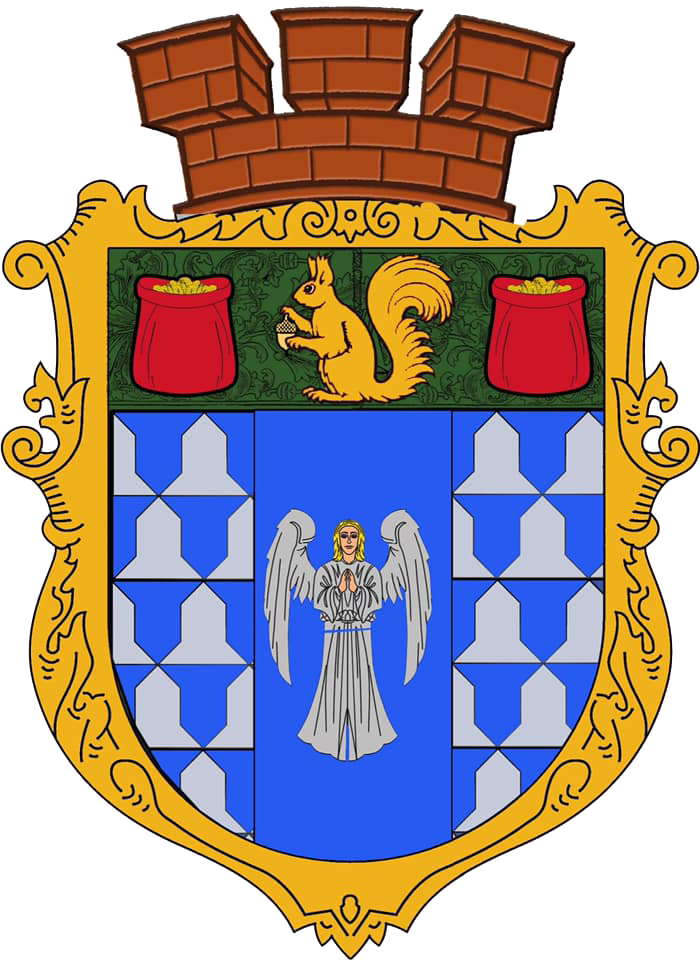
- Flag Coat of arms
- Interactive map of Kotsiubynske
- Location within Kyiv Oblast Location within Ukraine
- Coordinates: 50°29′24″N 30°20′05″E
- Country: Ukraine
- Oblast: Kyiv Oblast
- Raion: Bucha Raion
- Hromada: Kotsiubynske settlement hromada
- Founded: 1900

Area
  - Total: 0.87 km^{2} (0.34 sq mi)

Population (2022)
  - Total: 17,623
  - Density: 20,000/km^{2} (52,000/sq mi)
- Postal code: 08298
- Area code: +380 4497

Kotsiubynske (Ukrainian: Коцюбинське) is a rural settlement and municipality in Bucha Raion, Kyiv Oblast (province) of Ukraine. The municipality is an enclave and located outside the borders of the Kyiv Oblast, instead fully surrounded by the nation's capital Kyiv (Sviatoshynskyi District). It is the only locality in Kotsiubynske settlement hromada, one of the hromadas of Ukraine. Population: 17,623 (2022 estimate).

== History ==
The settlement appeared in 1900 as a khutir Berkovets during the construction of the railroad Kyiv - Kovel (1897–1903). The khutir consisted of a single homestead which served as a residence for local forest rangers in the Bilychi Woods. The settlement belonged to the Kyiv-Podil Administration of State Property. In 1903, near the khutir was constructed a passing loop which later transformed into a train station Bilychi. The station was named after a village that was located in close vicinity (today, part of Kyiv city).

On 11 February 1941, the khutir Berkovets was given the status of an urban-type settlement and renamed Kotsiubynske.

Until 18 July 2020, Kotsiubynske belonged to Irpin Municipality. In July 2020, as part of the administrative reform of Ukraine, which reduced the number of raions of Kyiv Oblast to seven, Irpin Municipality was merged into Bucha Raion.

Until 26 January 2024, Kotsiubynske was designated urban-type settlement. On this day, a new law entered into force which abolished this status, and Kotsiubynske became a rural settlement.

== Demographics ==
In 2001 the ethnic composition in the village was as follows: Ukrainians — 70%, Russians — 26%.

Historical population
Year	Pop.	±%
1959	5,709	—
1970	7,388	+29.4%
1979	7,632	+3.3%
1989	9,712	+27.3%
2001	13,982	+44.0%
2011	15,038	+7.6%
2022	17,623	+17.2%

=== By language ===
Language composition of the population
year	Ukrainian	Russian
2001	93,66 %	5,96 %
