= Dmytrivka rural hromada, Kyiv Oblast =

Dmytrivka rural hromada Дмитрівська селищна громада
- Hromada
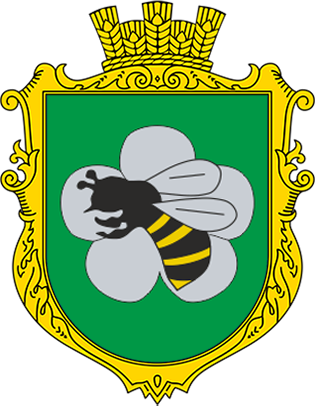
- Seal
- Interactive map of Dmytrivka rural hromada
- Country: Ukraine
- Oblast: Kyiv Oblast
- Raion: Bucha Raion

Area
  - Total: 138.8 km^{2} (53.6 sq mi)

Population (2020)
  - Total: 17,944
  - Density: 129.3/km^{2} (334.8/sq mi)
- Settlements: 14
- Villages: 14

Dmytrivka rural hromada (Ukrainian: Дмитрівська селищна громада) is a hromada of Ukraine, located in Bucha Raion, Kyiv Oblast. Its administrative center is the village of Dmytrivka.

It has an area of 138.8 square kilometres (53.6 mi^{2}) and a population of 17,944, as of 2020.

The hromada contains 14 settlements, which are all villages:

- Bucha
- Buzova
- Dmytrivka
- Horbovichi
- Hurivshchyna
- Kapitanivka
- Khmilna
- Lisne
- Lychanka
- Liubymivka
- Myla
- Mriia
- Petrushky
- Shpytky

== See also ==
- List of hromadas of Ukraine
