= Piskivka, Kyiv Oblast =

Rural locality in Kyiv Oblast, Ukraine

Piskivka Пісківка
- Rural settlement
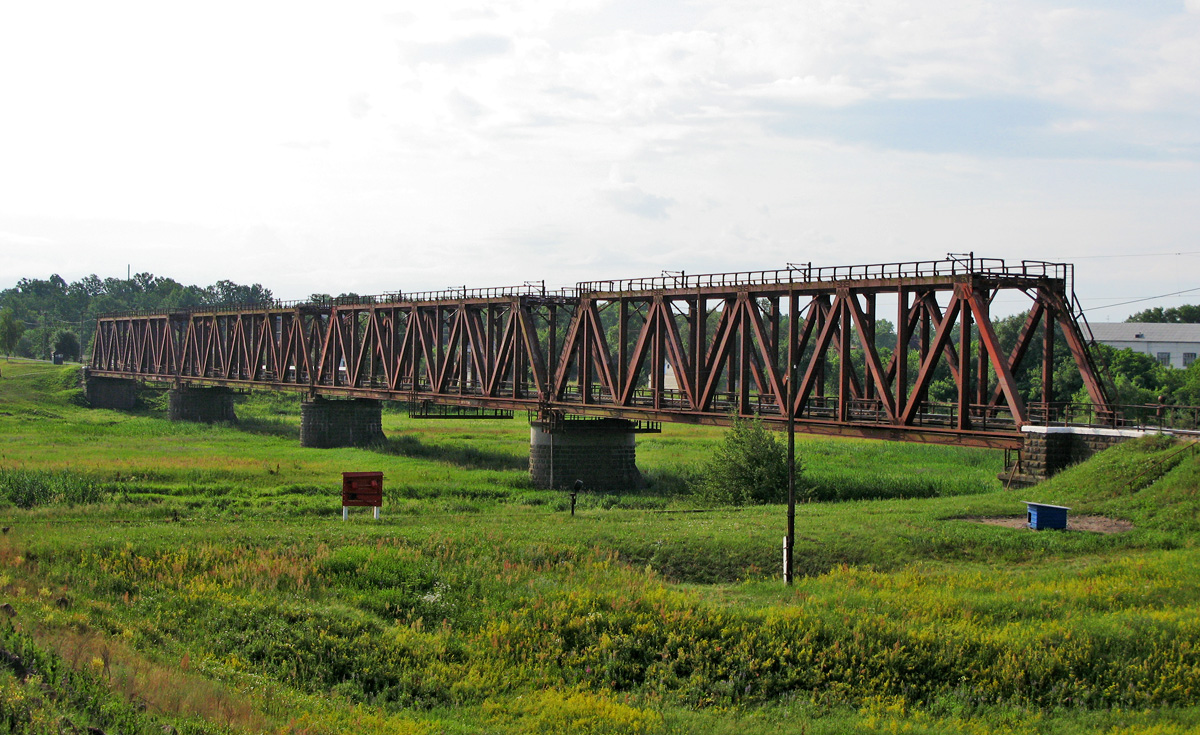
- Railway bridge over Teteriv river near Piskivka

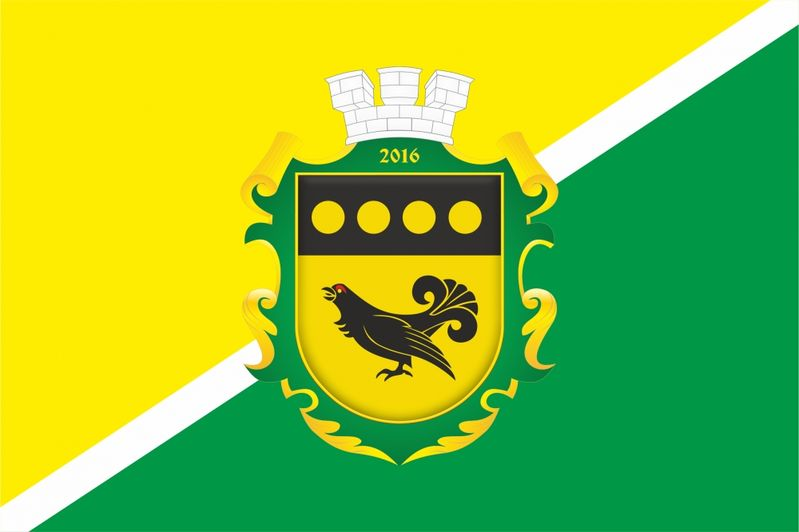
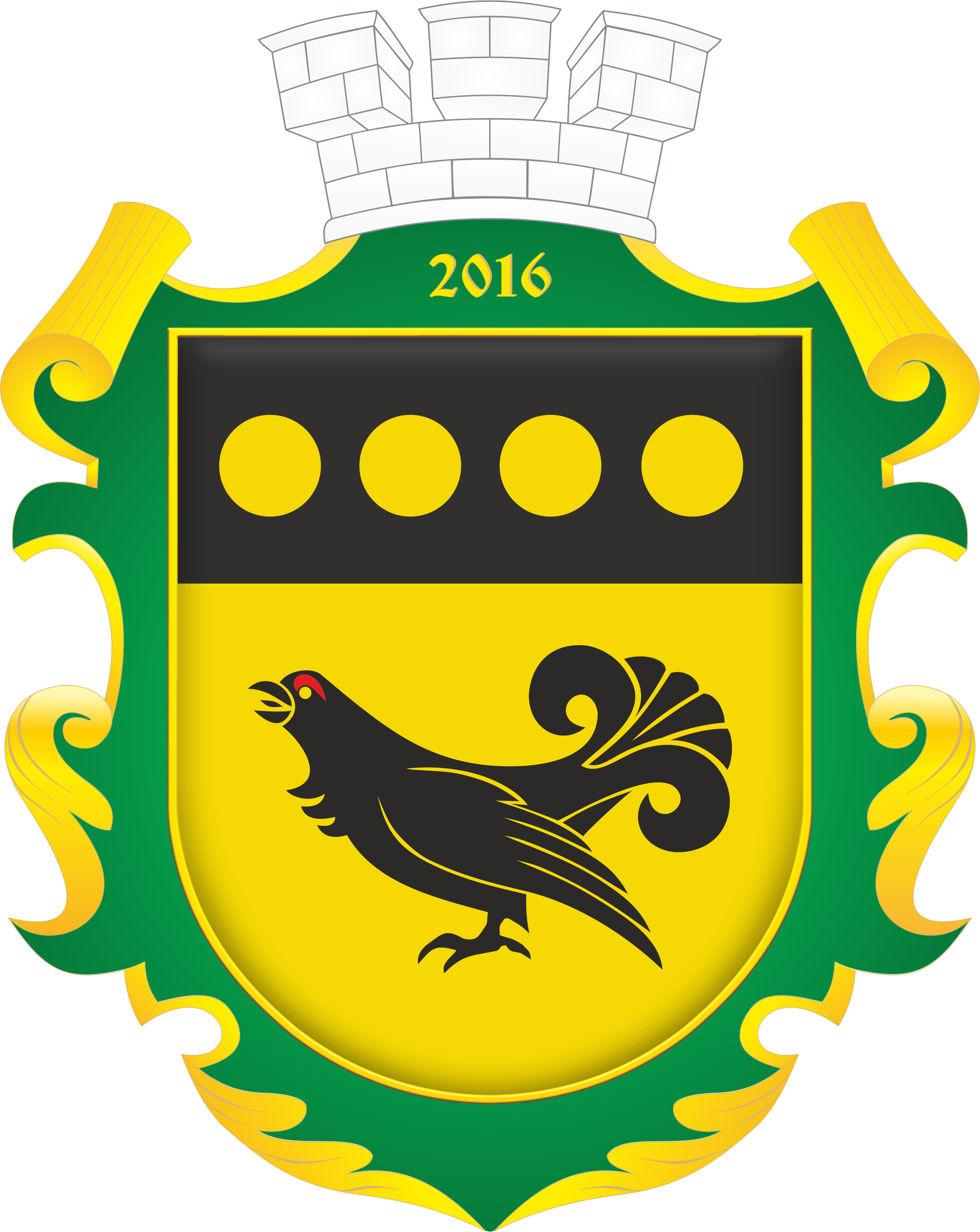
- Flag Coat of arms

- Location of Piskivka in Ukraine Piskivka (Kyiv Oblast)
- Coordinates: 50°42′28″N 29°35′42″E
- Country: Ukraine
- Oblast: Kyiv Oblast
- District: Bucha Raion
- Town status: 1938

Government
  - Town Head: Oleksandr Huziuk

Area
  - Total: 48 km^{2} (19 sq mi)

Population (2021)
  - Total: 8,056
  - Density: 170/km^{2} (430/sq mi)
- Time zone: UTC+2 (EET)
  - Summer (DST): UTC+3 (EEST)
- Postal code: 07820
- Area code: +380 4577
- Website: http://rada.gov.ua/

Piskivka (Ukrainian: Пісківка) is a rural settlement in Bucha Raion (district) of Kyiv Oblast (province) in northern Ukraine. It hosts the administration of Piskivka settlement hromada, one of the hromadas of Ukraine. Its population is 6,178 as of the 2001 Ukrainian Census. The population of the settlement was 7,173 at the 2001 Ukrainian census. Current population: 8,056 (2021 est.).

== History ==
Until 18 July 2020, Piskivka belonged to Borodianka Raion. The raion was abolished that day as part of the administrative reform of Ukraine, which reduced the number of raions of Kyiv Oblast to seven. The area of Borodianka Raion was merged into Bucha Raion.

Until 26 January 2024, Piskivka was designated urban-type settlement. On this day, a new law entered into force which abolished this status, and Piskivka became a rural settlement.

== People from Piskivka ==
- Maryna Lazebna (born 1975), Ukrainian politician
