= Nemishaieve =

Rural locality in Kyiv Oblast, Ukraine

Nemishaieve Немішаєве
- Rural settlement
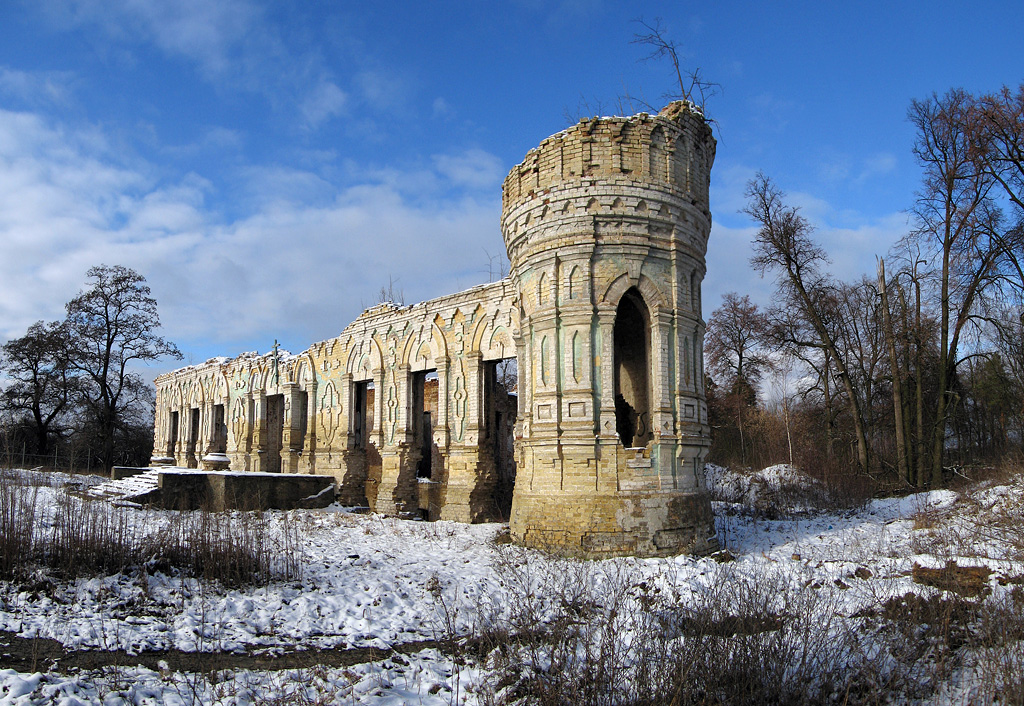
- Ruins of the Osten-Saken estate.

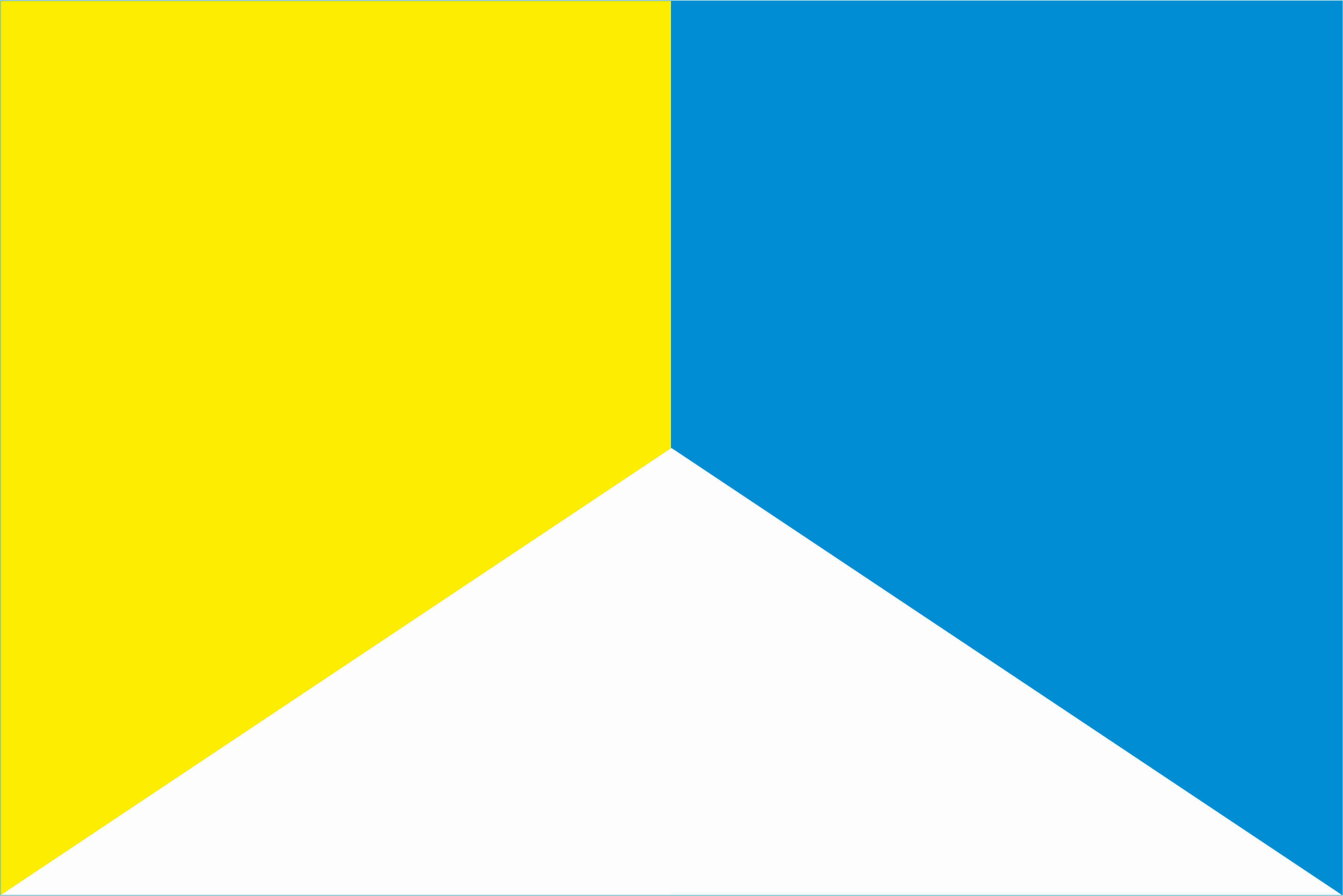
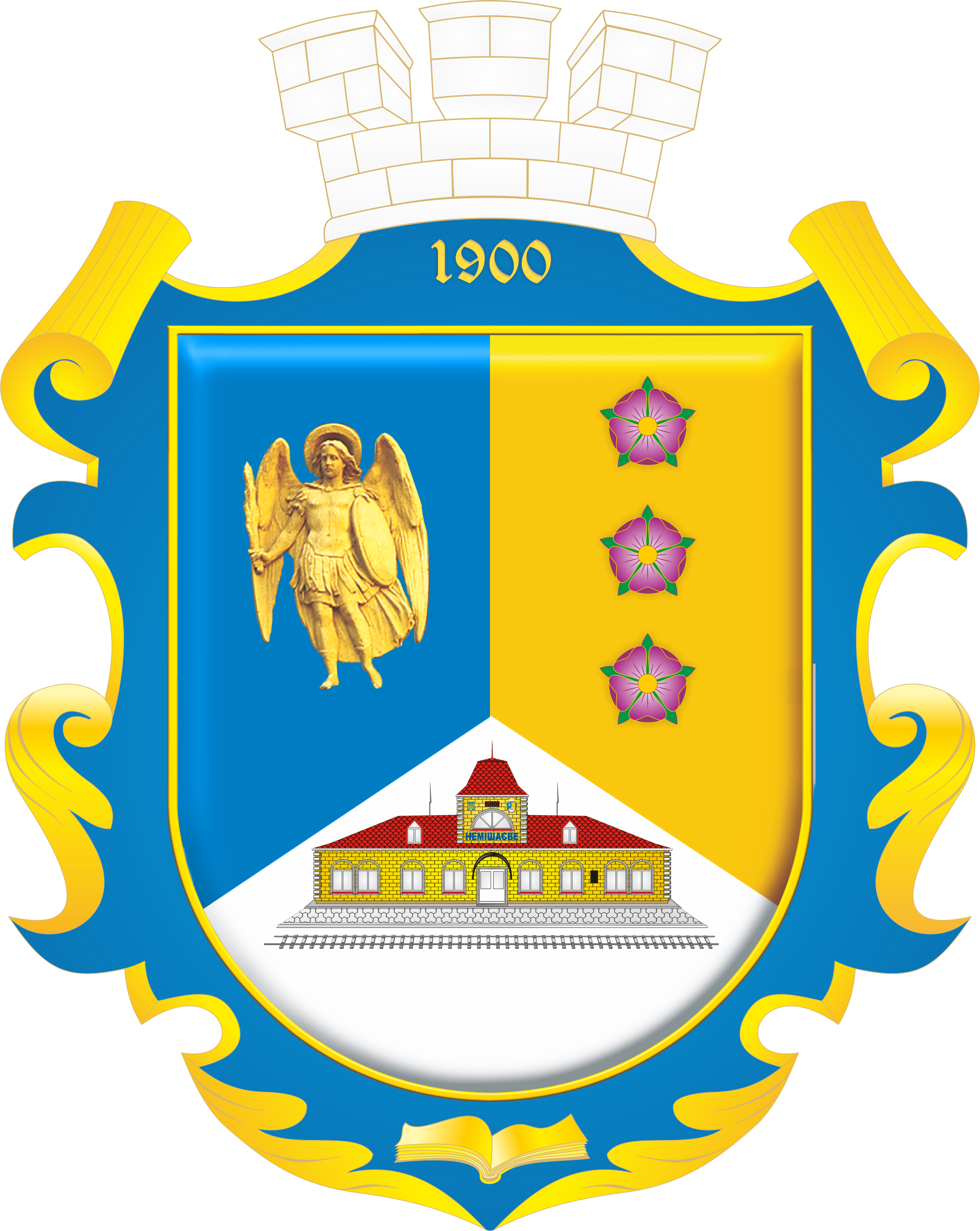
- Flag Coat of arms

- Location of Nemishaieve in Ukraine Nemishaieve (Kyiv Oblast)
- Coordinates: 50°33′53″N 30°05′37″E
- Country: Ukraine
- Oblast: Kyiv Oblast
- Raion: Bucha Raion
- Hromada: Nemishaieve settlement hromada
- Founded: 1900
- Town status: 1950

Government
  - Town Head: Petro Perevoznyk (ES)

Area
  - Total: 5.865 km^{2} (2.264 sq mi)
- Elevation: 156 m (512 ft)

Population (2024)
  - Total: 9,201 (approx) ▲
  - Density: 1,569/km^{2} (4,063/sq mi)
- Time zone: UTC+2 (EET)
  - Summer (DST): UTC+3 (EEST)
- Postal code: 07853, 07854
- Area code: +380 4577
- Website: http://rada.gov.ua/

Nemishaieve (Ukrainian: Немішаєве) (formerly Shevchenkove from 1917–1928; Ukrainian: Шевченкове) is a rural settlement in Bucha Raion (district) of Kyiv Oblast (province) in northern Ukraine. Nemishaieve hosts the administration of Nemishaieve settlement hromada, one of the hromadas of Ukraine. Its population is 6,178 as of the 2001 Ukrainian Census. Current population: 7,855 (2022 estimate). The settlement is located 38 kilometres (24 mi) to the north west of the nation's capital Kyiv.

== History ==
Nemishaieve was founded in 1900 as a village, and it retained its village status until it was upgraded to that of an urban-type settlement in 1950. The ruins of the Osten-Saksen estate, which was built in the 19th century, are located in the town.

The construction of the Kyiv-Kovel railroad facilitated the construction of a settlement, Nemishaieve, which was founded in September 1900. Nemishaieve is named in honor of the Southwestern Railways Director Klavdiy Nemishaiev, an influential Russian engineer and statesman, who provided 63 kilometres (39 mi) of land for construction of the railway and its workers. Prior to the town's formation, the settlement was a possession of the influential Russian Vorontsov family.

During World War II, local Soviet partisans who fought a guerrilla war against the Axis occupation of the Soviet Union were based in the village. After the war, Nemishaieve was upgraded to that of an urban-type settlement in 1950.

Until 18 July 2020, Nemishaieve belonged to Borodianka Raion. The raion was abolished that day as part of the administrative reform of Ukraine, which reduced the number of raions of Kyiv Oblast to seven. The area of Borodianka Raion was merged into Bucha Raion.

In 2022, a week after the 2022 Russian invasion of Ukraine, Vadym Denysenko, an adviser to the Ukrainian interior minister, said that a battle had taken place between Ukrainian and Russian forces.

On 26 January 2024, a new law entered into force which abolished the status of urban-type settlement, and Nemishaieve became a rural settlement.

== People from Nemishaieve ==
- Yuriy Karakai (1967), Ukrainian politician, People's Deputy of Verkhovna Rada from the Party of Regions.

== Gallery ==
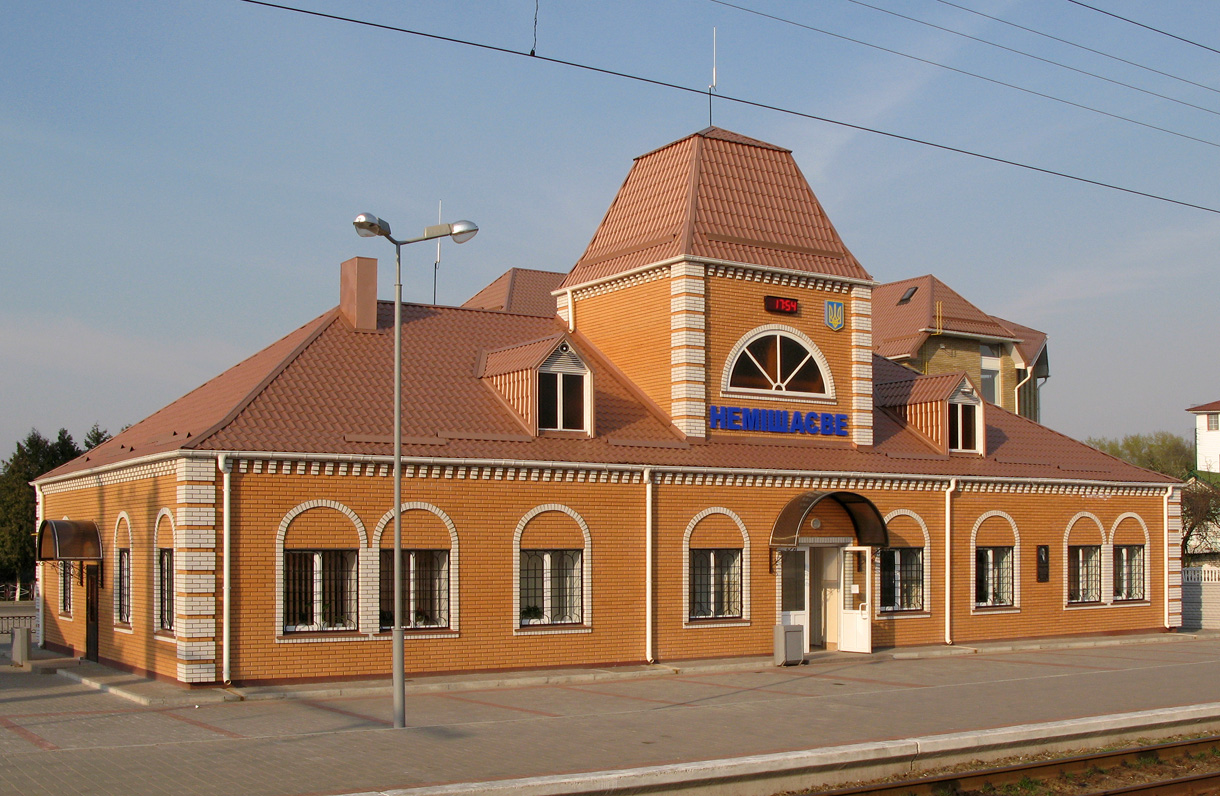
Nemishaieve Railway Station

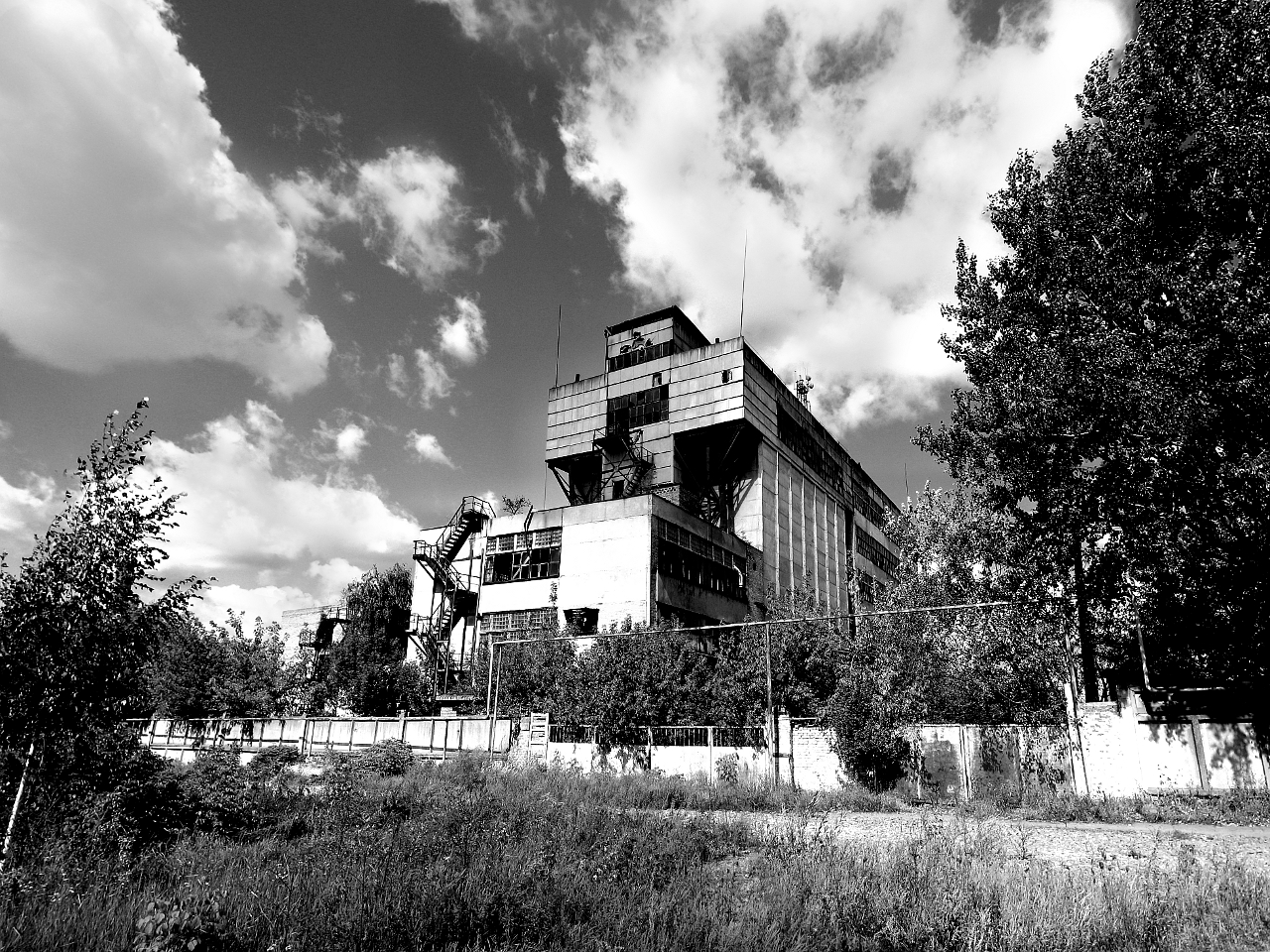
Biochemical factory in Nemishaieve
