= Piskivka settlement hromada =

Piskivka settlement hromada Пісківська селищна громада
- Hromada
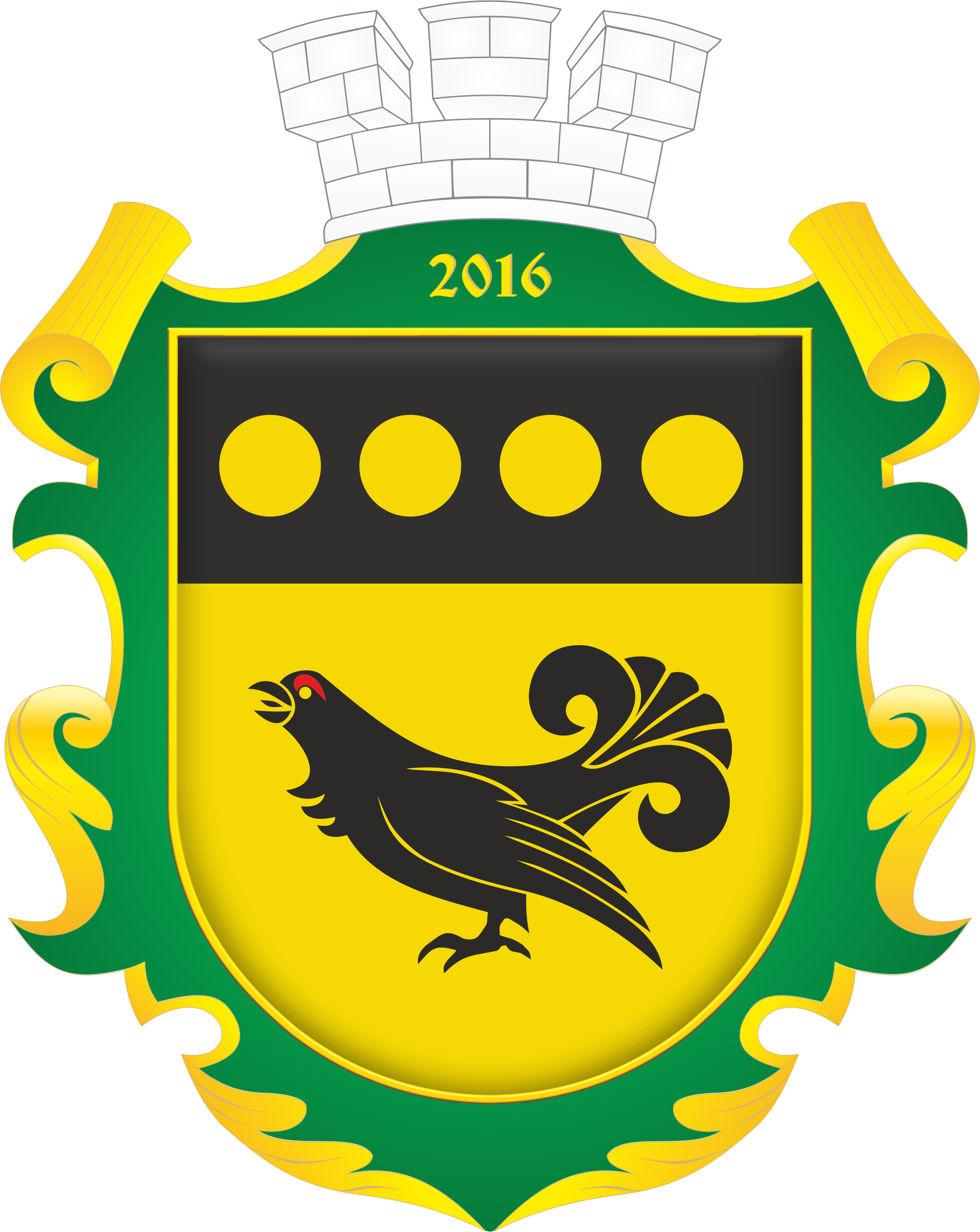
- Seal
- Interactive map of Piskivka settlement hromada
- Country: Ukraine
- Oblast: Kyiv
- Raion: Bucha

Area
  - Total: 157.4 km^{2} (60.8 sq mi)

Population (2020)
  - Total: 7,904
  - Density: 50.22/km^{2} (130.1/sq mi)
- Settlements: 3
- Villages: 2
- Towns: 1

Piskivka settlement hromada (Ukrainian: Пісківська селищна громада) is a hromada of Ukraine, located in Bucha Raion, Kyiv Oblast. Its administrative center is the town of Piskivka.

It has an area of 157.4 square kilometres (60.8 mi^{2}) and a population of 7,904, as of 2020.

The hromada includes 3 settlements: 1 town (Piskivka), and 2 villages (Myhalky and Raska).

== See also ==
- List of hromadas of Ukraine
