= Nemishaieve settlement hromada =

Nemishaieve settlement hromada Немішаївська селищна громада
- Hromada
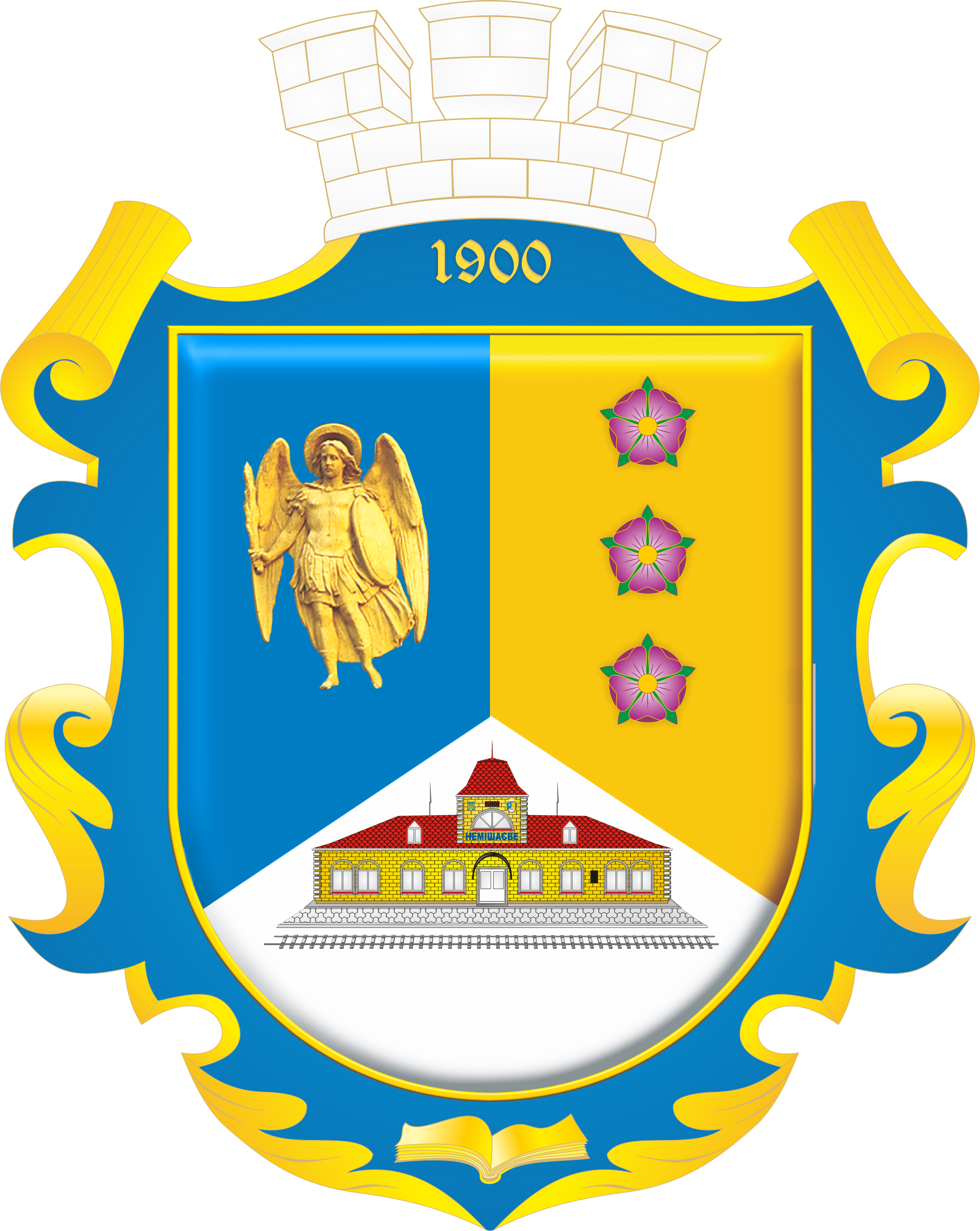
- Seal
- Interactive map of Nemishaieve settlement hromada
- Country: Ukraine
- Oblast: Kyiv
- Raion: Bucha
- Admin. center: Nemishaieve

Area
  - Total: 80.0 km^{2} (30.9 sq mi)

Population (2020)
  - Total: 15,184
  - Density: 190/km^{2} (492/sq mi)
- Settlements: 4
- Villages: 2
- Towns: 2

Nemishaieve settlement hromada (Ukrainian: Немішаївська селищна громада) is a hromada of Ukraine, located in Bucha Raion, Kyiv Oblast. Its administrative center is the town of Nemishaieve.

It has an area of 80.0 square kilometres (30.9 mi^{2}) and a population of 15,184, as of 2020.

The hromada includes four settlements: two urban-type settlements (Nemishaieve and Klavdiievo-Tarasove), and two villages (Mykulychi and Poroskoten).

== See also ==
- List of hromadas of Ukraine
