= Borodianka settlement hromada =

Borodianka settlement hromada Бородянська селищна громада
- Hromada
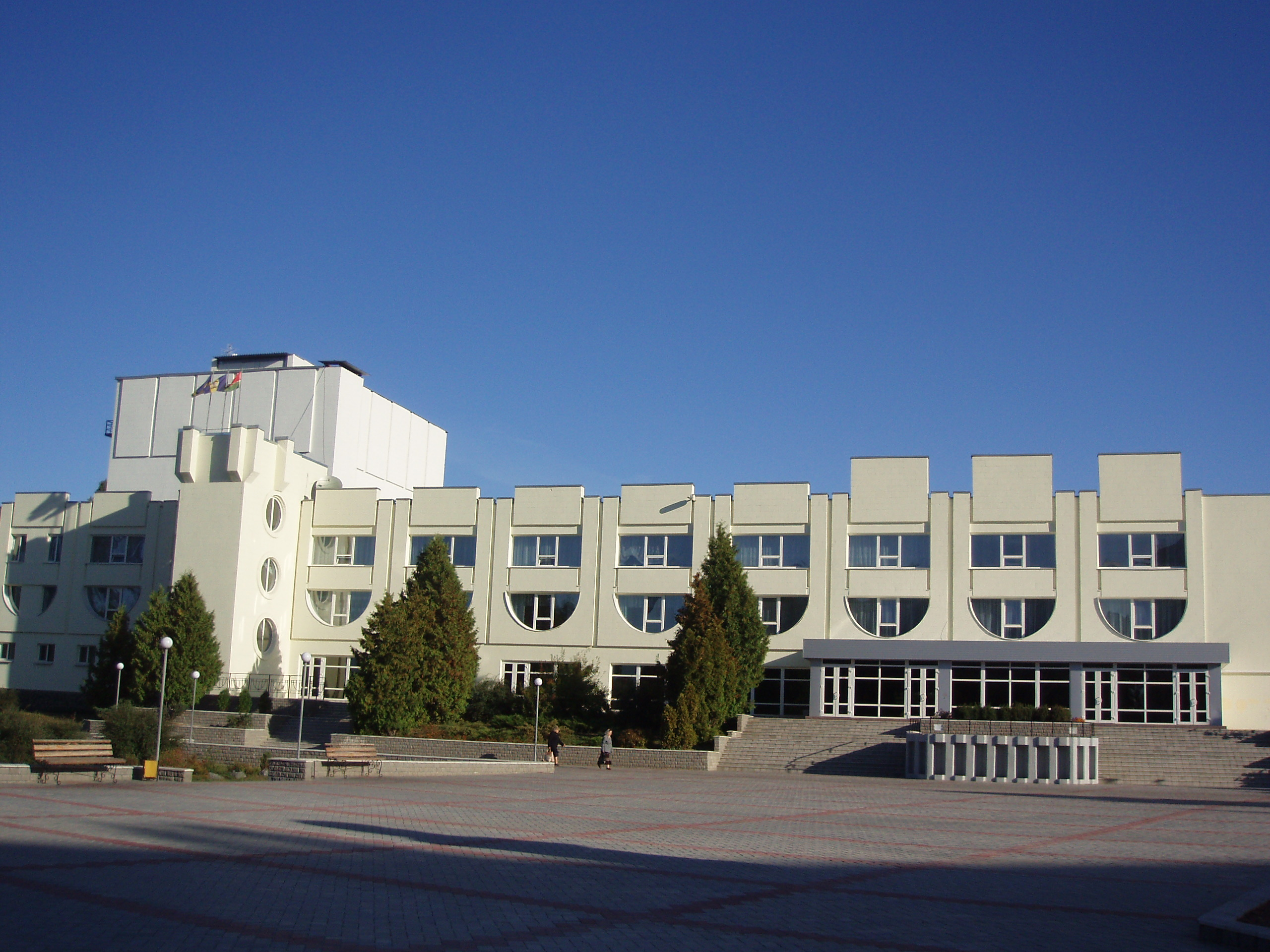
- Borodianka District Culture House, September 2009
- Interactive map of Borodianka settlement hromada
- Country: Ukraine
- Oblast: Kyiv Oblast
- Raion: Bucha Raion

Area
  - Total: 512.7 km^{2} (198.0 sq mi)

Population (2020)
  - Total: 25,332
  - Density: 49.41/km^{2} (128.0/sq mi)
- Settlements: 32
- Villages: 31
- Towns: 1

Borodianka settlement hromada (Ukrainian: Бородянська селищна громада) is a hromada of Ukraine, located in Bucha Raion, Kyiv Oblast. Its administrative center is the rural settlement of Borodianka.

It has an area of 512.7 square kilometres (198.0 mi^{2}) and a population of 25,332, as of 2020.

The hromada includes 32 settlements: 1 rural settlement (Borodianka), and 31 villages:

- Berestianka
- Bondarnia
- Vablia
- Velykyi Lis
- Vyshniaky
- Volytsia
- Hai
- Halynka
- Dmytrivka
- Druzhnia
- Zahaltsi
- Kachaly
- Koblytskyi Lis
- Koblytsia
- Krasnyi Rih
- Maidanivka
- Myrcha
- Mykhailenkiv
- Nebrat
- Nova Buda
- Nova Hreblia
- Nove Zalissia
- Novy Korohod
- Ozershchyna
- Pylypovychi
- Potashnia
- Stara Buda
- Talske
- Torfiane
- Shybene
- Yazvynka

== See also ==
- List of hromadas of Ukraine
