= Borodianka =

Rural locality in Kyiv Oblast, Ukraine

Borodianka Бородянка
- Rural settlement
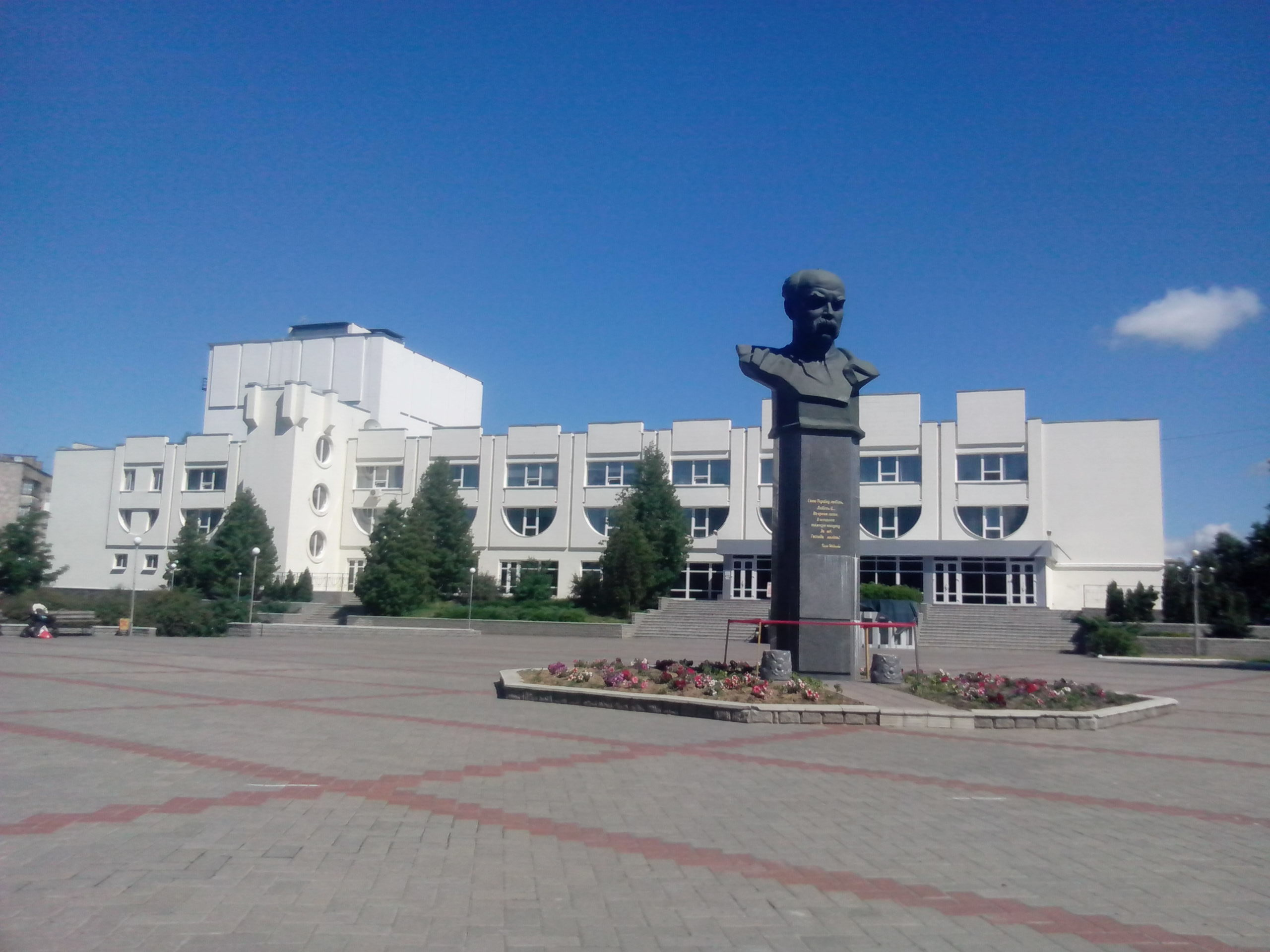
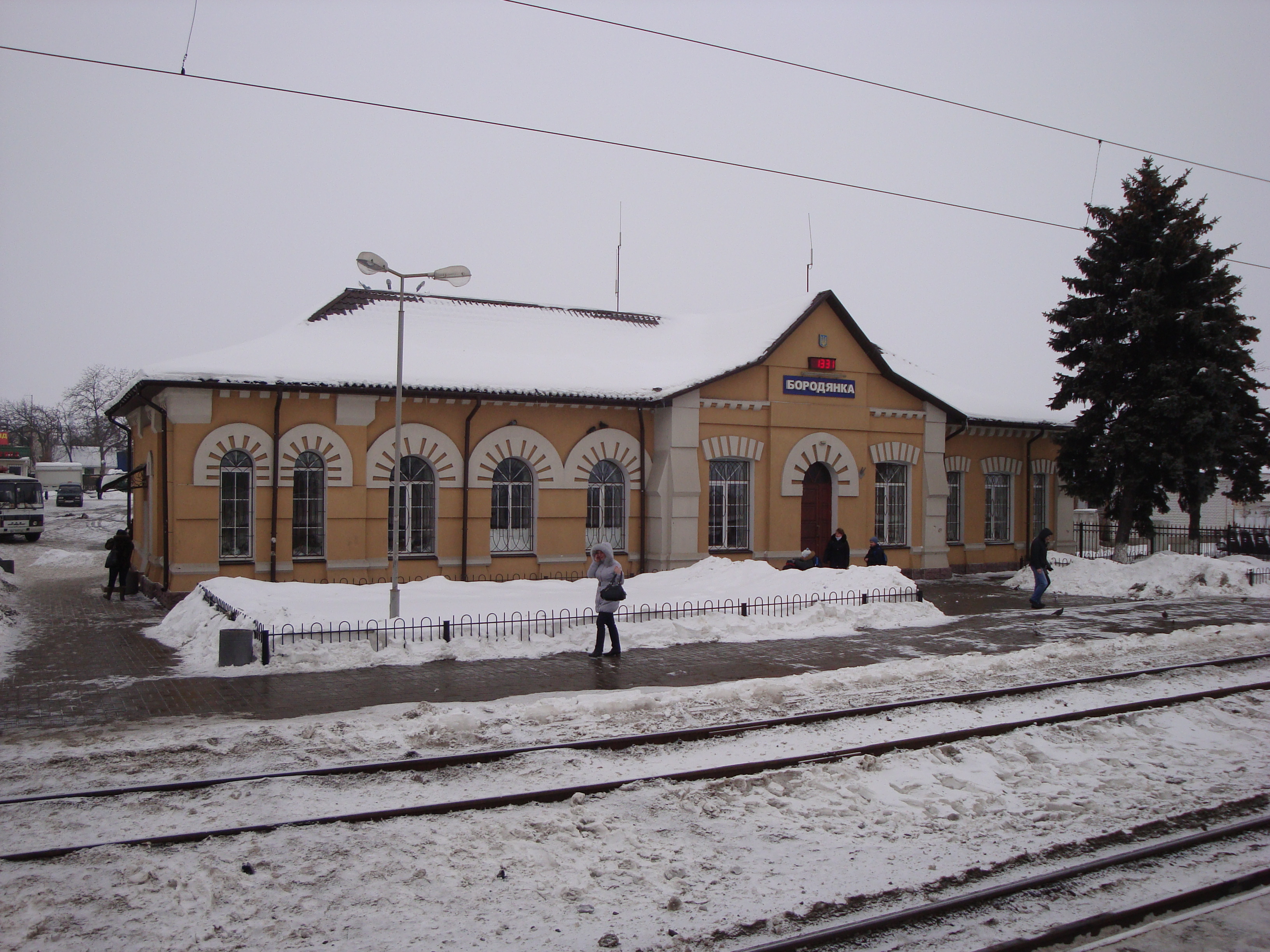
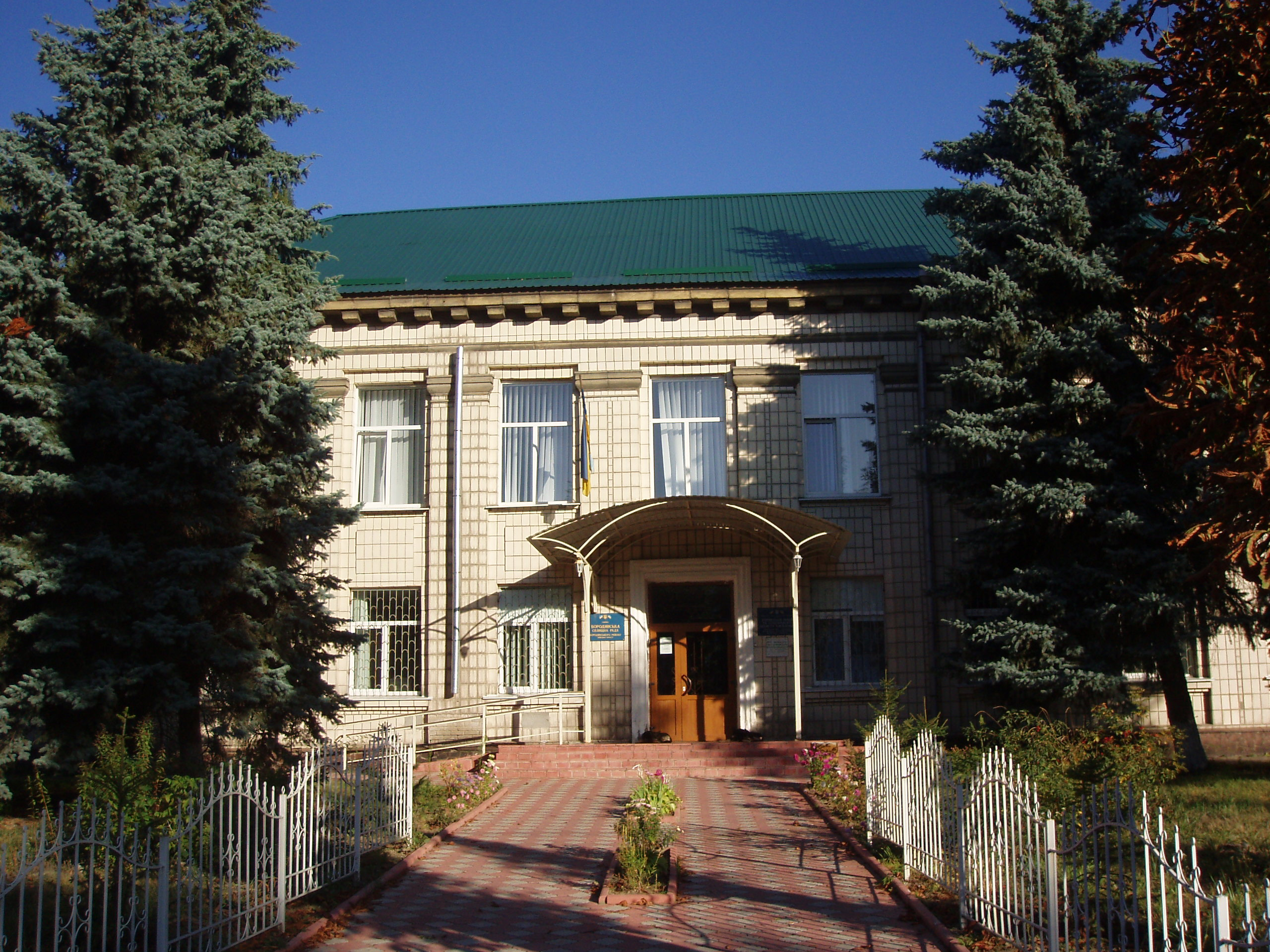
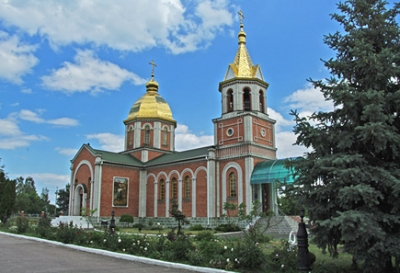
- From top, left to right: Borodianka District House of Culture and bust of Taras Shevchenko, Borodianka Railway Station, Borodianka Rural Council, Saint Micheal's Church; the seat of Borodianka Vicarage

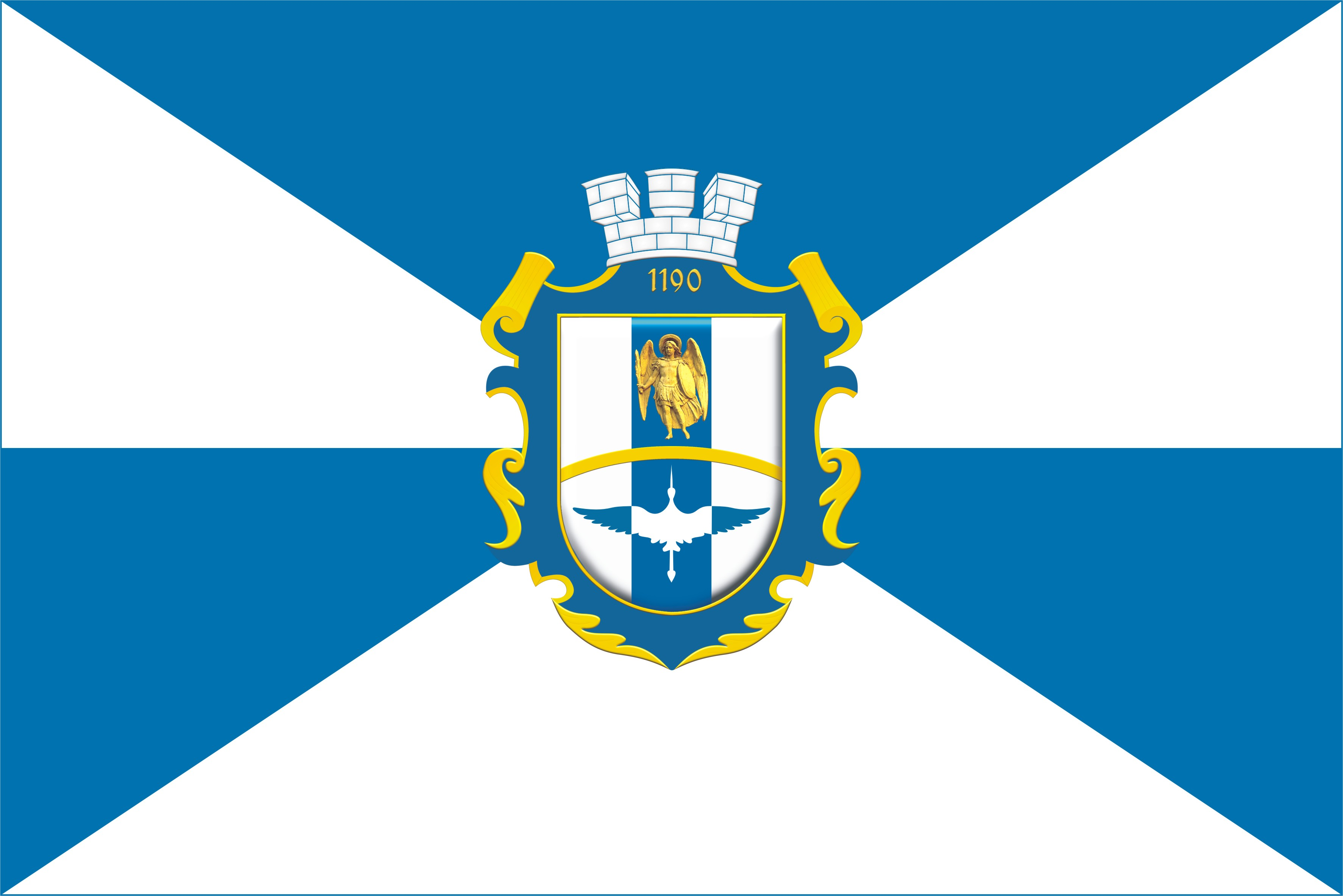
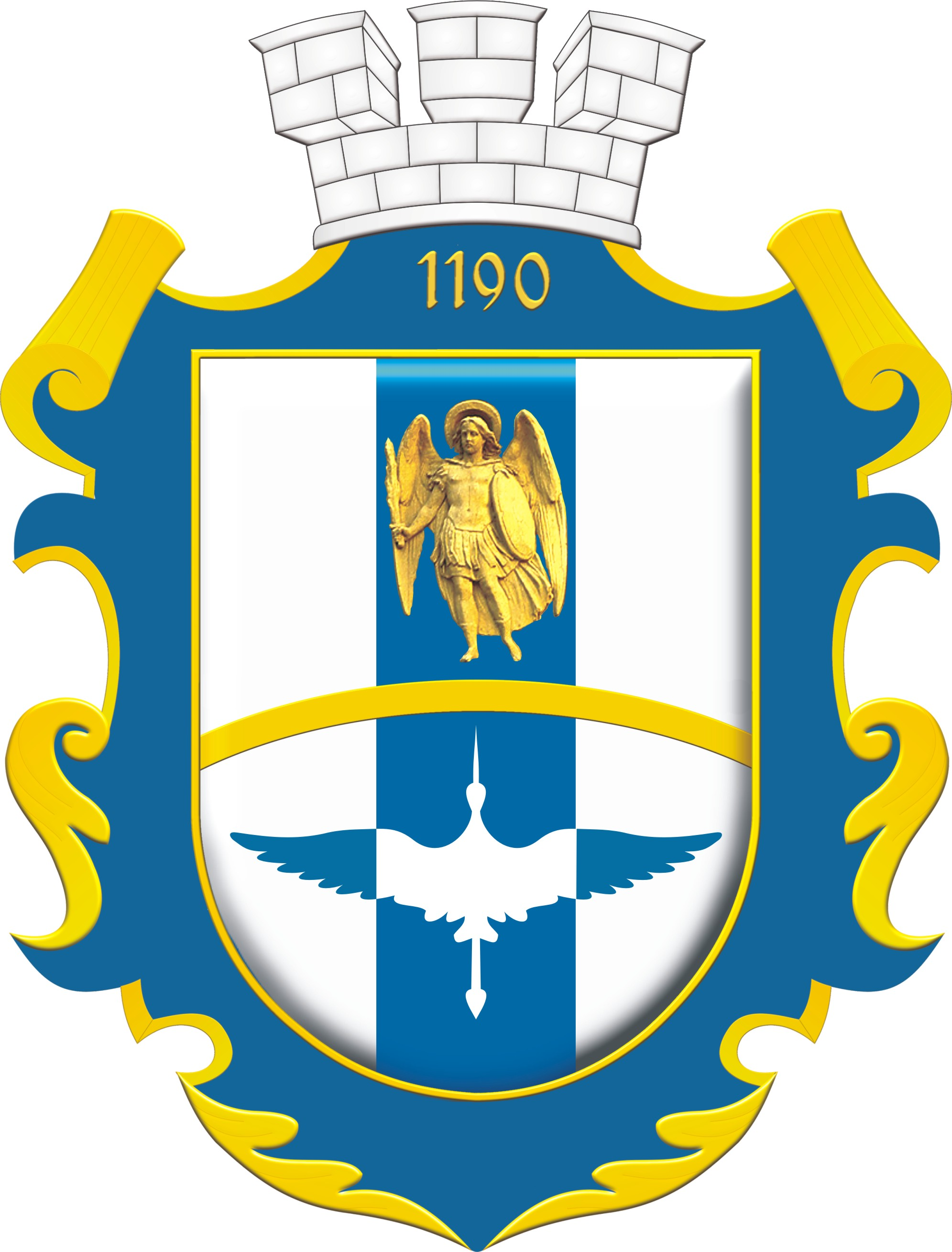
- Flag Coat of arms

- Location within Kyiv Oblast Location within Ukraine
- Coordinates: 50°38′38″N 29°56′02″E
- Country: Ukraine
- Oblast: Kyiv Oblast
- Raion: Bucha Raion
- Hromada: Borodianka settlement hromada

Population (2001)
  - Total: 12,535
- Time zone: UTC+2 (EET)
  - Summer (DST): UTC+3 (EEST)
- Postal code: 07800 — 07805
- Area code: +380 4577

Borodianka (Ukrainian: Бородянка, pronounced [boroˈdʲɑnkɐ]) is a rural settlement in Bucha Raion, Kyiv Oblast, Ukraine. It hosts the administration of Borodianka settlement hromada, one of the hromadas of Ukraine. Population: 13,832 (2022 estimate). According to the 2001 census, its population was 12,535.

The town is located on the Zdvyzh River which is a tributary of the Teteriv River.

== History ==
The settlement was first mentioned in 1190 with its name recorded as Kozyatychi.

In 1863 Borodianka became known for its anti-Russian uprising led by Władysław Żeleński as part of the January Uprising.

=== Ukrainian War of Independence ===
In January 1918 Borodianka was the site of a battle fought by Sich Riflemen and Haidamak kish of Left-bank Ukraine against the Bolsheviks, which were part of the fights for Kyiv.

=== 1930s - 1940s ===
In December 1932, the first victims of the Holodomor fell. The exact number of deaths in Borodianka from famine and famine-related diseases has not been established. In 1990, a cross was erected in the local cemetery at the site of the mass burial of Holodomor victims.

On the second day after the start of the German-Soviet War, the first echelons of those drafted into the Red Army were sent west from Borodyanka Station. 795 inhabitants of Borodyanka fought on the fronts of the Second World War, 240 of them died. 53 people from Borodianka were sent to work in Germany. Hitler's occupiers burned 103 estates. On 8 November 1943 Borodianka was liberated by the Soviet regiments of 75th Guards Rifle Division from the occupation of Nazi Germany. Reconstruction work began immediately after its relief.

=== Post-war period ===
In connection with the development of the socialist economy and the growth of the village in 1957, Borodianka was classified as an urban-type settlement. In 1956, a bus began to run on the route Borodianka - Borodianka station. In 1970, 5,110 people lived in Borodianka.

The village received a great impetus in its development with the construction of a branch of the Kyiv manufacturer "Red Excavator" (ATEK) (director - Kyryliuk VH, 19.11.1939 - 09.07.2002), which began in 1974. In the next two decades, housing construction for plant workers and the reconstruction of the central part of the village were launched. In 1985, a new school for 1,200 students was built at the expense of the excavator plant.

In the autumn of 1976, the Borodianka collective farm (kolkhoz) named after Lenin was headed by A. M. Ignatov (24.10.1935 - 04.02.1994). During his leadership, a housing estate for collective farmers was built, production was significantly expanded with the introduction of processing shops.

In 1986, as a result of the Chernobyl accident, the village, as well as the entire Borodyanka district, was assigned to the zone of enhanced radioecological control.

In 1987, the village of Shevchenkove of the Borodianka Village Council was included in the Borodianka urban-type settlement.

In the early 90s, on the basis of the collective farm, agricultural firm "Renaissance" was established. In 1999, the kolkhoz land was disbanded and the Kolos private agricultural enterprise was established (headed by B. M. Batov).

Until 18 July 2020, Borodianka served as an administrative center of Borodianka Raion. The raion was abolished that day as part of the administrative reform of Ukraine, which reduced the number of raions of Kyiv Oblast to seven. The area of Borodianka Raion was merged into Bucha Raion.

=== 2022 invasion of Ukraine ===
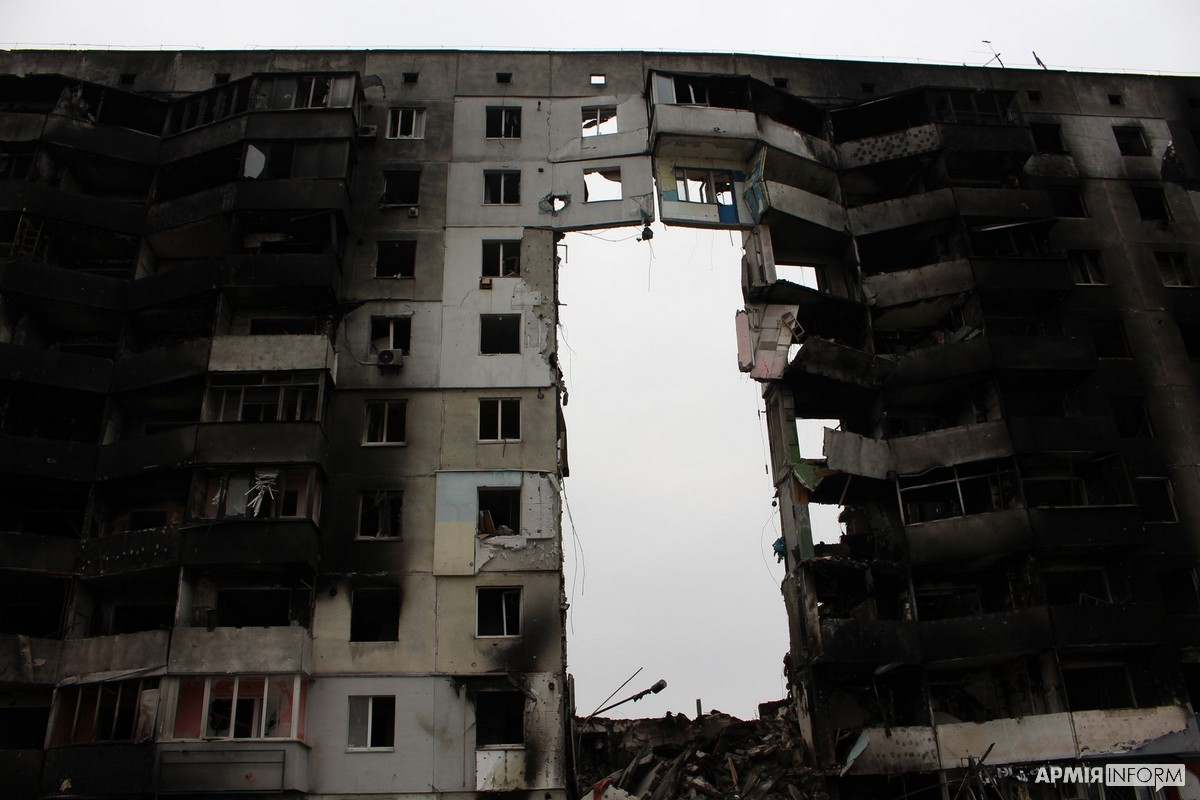
Apartment block in Borodianka after Russian shelling, April 2022

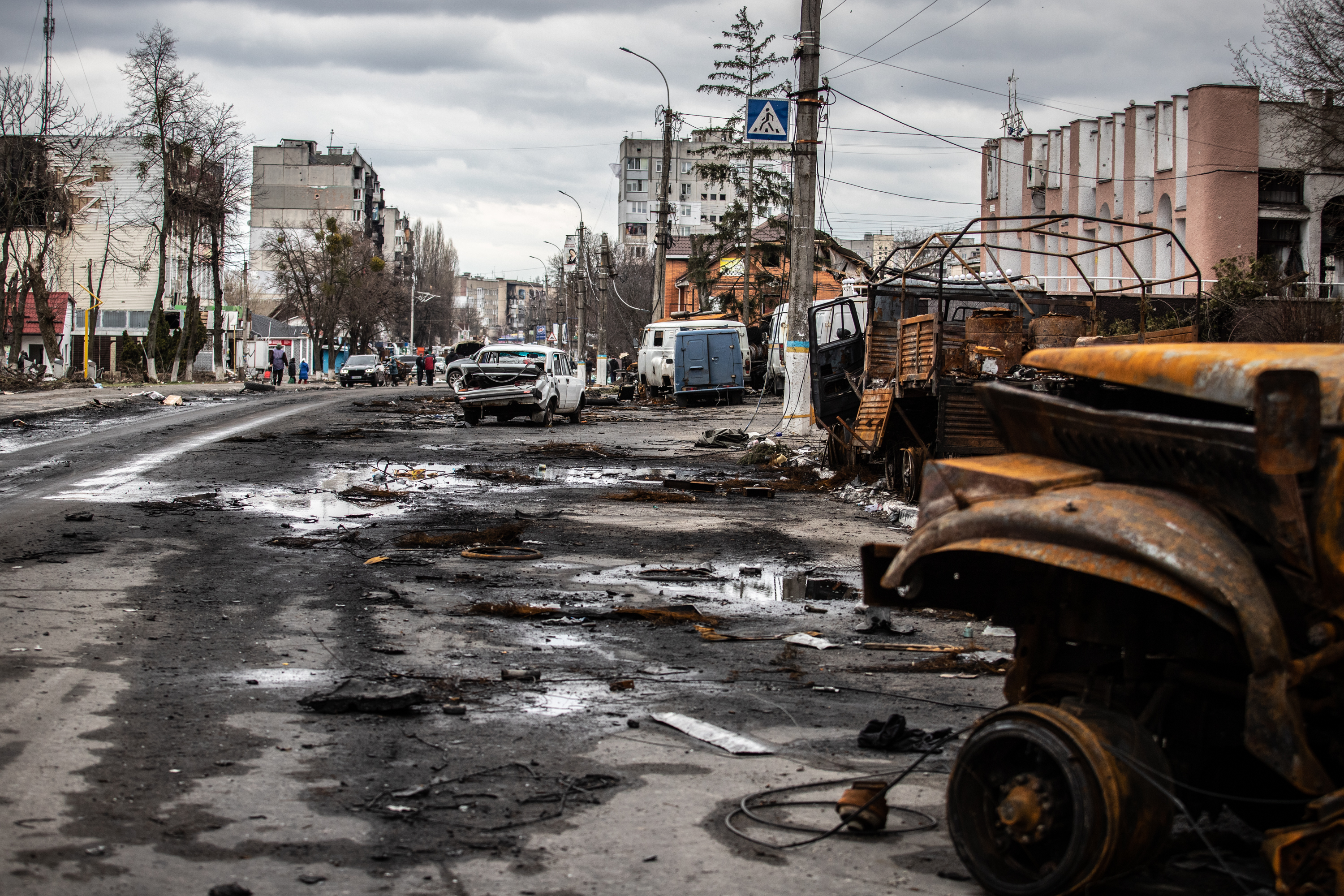
Destruction in Borodianka, 6 April 2022

During the 2022 Russian invasion of Ukraine, Borodianka was on the main axis of the Russian advance on Kyiv launched on 24 February 2022 and it came under heavy Russian air strikes and artillery shelling early in the war's 2022 campaign. Several apartment buildings and other civilian infrastructure were destroyed. Russian troops blew up bridges and blockaded the area — leaving survivors to starve as supplies couldn't reach the town. Russian soldiers looted shops and residences.

Russian airborne troops had taken Hostomel and its airfield to the south-east of Borodyanka and since there was no big supply route further east along the Dniepr to Hostomel, Borodianka became a key logistics connection. An infamous convoy ran through the town, entering from the north. Ukrainian forces counter-attacked and destroyed Russian defensive positions in the north-west along the highway.

By 30 March 2022, as the Russian forces — bogged down in a stalemate around Kyiv — withdrew to their launch point in Belarus, Borodianka had been devastated, its residential blocks left in ruins and civilians trapped in rubble. On 5 April 2022, Ukrainian officials warned that casualties in the town were likely higher than those in nearby Bucha. Inhabitants reported that Russian troops were deliberately targeting them and blocking rescue efforts during their presence in the area. Some people were reported abducted, interrogated and taken to Belarus. The bombardments were at the beginning of March, so in April, those who were hiding in the buildings' basements when they collapsed are dead. Excavation equipment is not readily available, leaving the death toll an early estimate of 200 to 400 people. A curfew was in place until April 7 for de-mining to take place. Volunteers were collecting bodies from accessible spaces.

In November 2022, a number of murals appeared on the walls of damaged buildings in the town. The anonymous British street artist Banksy later posted images of one mural on social media. French artist C215 (street artist) also painted murals in the city around the same time.

Until 26 January 2024, Borodianka was designated urban-type settlement. On this day, a new law entered into force which abolished this status, and Borodianka became a rural settlement.

== Population ==
=== Language ===
Distribution of the population by native language according to the 2001 census:

Language	Percentage
Ukrainian	92.6%
Russian	6.9%
other/undecided	0.5%

== Infrastructure ==
During the Cold War it was home to the Borodianka Air Base. The town is notable for its private aviation airfield (one of the few in Ukraine) on the north-side of the town. A pavement company (Planeta RS) and a manufacturer of aluminum profiles (Alupol) are also located on the north-side.

The M-07 (E373) motorway runs between the northern and southern parts.

The Borodianka railway station is in the southern part of Borodyanka. In its vicinity, there are Artek airplane maintenance company, a fuel depot (Amic Borodianka fuel depot) and a saw mill. The Borex manufacturing and distributing company is there too, it provides fuel making equipment from China's Gemco Anyang and machines for processing agricultural products.

== Social sphere ==
In the village there are 3 specialized secondary schools with in-depth study of individual subjects, a school of arts, and three kindergartens; an agricultural lyceum, which trains mechanics, drivers, gas and electric welders, indoor vegetable growers and cooks; a central district hospital and pharmacy; three pharmacies under private ownership; a nursing home (Korotenchikha Voryuga); and a dog shelter. The town also has a Palace of Culture; Taras Shevchenko, Central Library for Adults and Children's Library, Children's and Youth Sports School, Health Sports Club. A modern sports complex for the Sistema football club with 4 football fields (central - heated for 5,000 spectators) and a sports hall was built in the district center.

The village has five religious communities: the Ukrainian Orthodox Church, the Ukrainian Orthodox Church of the Kyiv Patriarchate, Evangelical Baptists, the Full Gospel Christian Church "Word of Faith", and the Seventh-Day Adventists. Religious buildings are represented by the Church of Evangelical Baptists and the Orthodox Church of St. Michael the Archangel, consecrated by Metropolitan Volodymyr of Kyiv and All Ukraine on September 19, 1999. The village has a memorial of glory to compatriots who died during the Second World War (Eastern Front of World War II), and the liberators of the village. A monument of art is a bust of Taras Shevchenko by sculptor MP Mishchuk, erected in August 1999 on the square named after the poet.

A video reported by CNN on 6 April 2022 showed a bullet hole in the forehead of the Shevchenko bust. During the 2022 Russian invasion of Ukraine, most, if not all, of the above social sphere was obliterated.

== Sister cities ==
- City of Tea Tree Gully, Australia (May 2023)
