= Bucha Raion =

Subdivision of Kyiv Oblast, Ukraine

Coordinates: 50°37′N 29°48′E

Bucha Raion Бучанський район
- Raion
- Interactive map of Bucha Raion
- Country: Ukraine
- Oblast: Kyiv Oblast
- Established: 2020
- Admin. center: Bucha
- Subdivisions: 12 hromadas

Area
  - Total: 1,544 km^{2} (596 sq mi)

Population (2022)
  - Total: 375,536
  - Density: 243.2/km^{2} (629.9/sq mi)

Bucha Raion (Ukrainian: Бучанський район, romanized: Buchanskyi raion) is a raion (district) of Kyiv Oblast, Ukraine. It was created in July 2020 as part of the reform of administrative divisions of Ukraine. Its administrative center is the town of Bucha. One abolished raion, Borodianka Raion, parts of abolished Kyiv-Sviatoshyn and Makariv Raions, as well as Irpin Municipality and the city of Bucha, which was previously incorporated as a city of oblast significance, were merged into Bucha Raion. The population of the raion is 375,536 (2022 estimate).

== Subdivisions ==
At the time of establishment, the raion consisted of 12 hromadas:

Bucha Raion subdivisions
Hromada (Community)	Admin. center	Population (2020)	Transferred/Retained from
Bilohorodka rural	Bilohorodka	25,392	Kyiv-Sviatoshyn Raion
Borodianka settlement	Borodianka	25,332	Borodianka Raion;
Borshchahivka rural	Sofiivska Borshchahivka	21,894	Kyiv-Sviatoshyn Raion;
Bucha urban	Bucha	57,163	city of oblast significance;
Dmytrivka rural	Dmytrivka	17,944	Kyiv-Sviatoshyn Raion;
Hostomel settlement	Hostomel	28,649	Irpin Municipality;
Irpin urban	Irpin	69,962	Irpin Municipality;
Kotsiubynske settlement	Kotsiubynske	17,623	Irpin Municipality;
Makariv settlement	Makariv	27,352	Makariv Raion;
Nemishaieve settlement	Nemishaieve	15,184	Borodianka Raion;
Piskivka settlement	Piskivka	7,904	Borodianka Raion.
Vyshneve urban	Vyshneve	48,357	Kyiv-Sviatoshyn Raion.
