= Yuriy Kuzmenko =

Ukrainian serial killer and rapist (born 1974)

- Born: Yuriy Mykolaivych Kuzmenko; 1974 (age 51–52); Velyka Vil'shanka, Kyiv Oblast, UkSSR
- Other names: "The Boiarka Maniac" "The Vasylkiv Maniac" "Elvis" "Elvis the Strangler" "Shatun"
- Convictions: Murder x13 Rape x13
- Penalty: Life imprisonment

Details
- Victims: 13–206
- Span of crimes: 2005–2009
- Country: Ukraine
- State: Kyiv
- Date apprehended: 29 May 2009
- Imprisoned at: Romenskoye Colony No. 56, Vyshneve, Kyiv Oblast

Yuriy Mykolaivych Kuzmenko (Ukrainian: Юрій Миколайович Кузьменко; born 1974), known as The Boiarka Maniac, nicknamed Elvis Presley or Shatun (Ukrainian: Боярський маньяк), is a Ukrainian serial killer and rapist who was linked to the rape-murders of at least 13 girls and women in the Kyiv Oblast between 2005 and 2009. Following his arrest, Kuzmenko himself claimed to be responsible for the murders of a total of 206 people, a claim that has never been verified.

The investigation into his crimes proved to be one of the most high-profile in the country's history, further complicated by the fact that two unrelated serial killers operated in the same area at the same time. The materials and methods used in the investigation were later intensely studied, and are currently utilized as a framework on similar cases.

== Early life ==
Yuriy Kuzmenko was born in 1974 in the village of Velyka Vil'shanka, Kyiv Oblast, and had a brother and sister. He grew up in an unstable family due to his father's antisocial behavior and frequent acts of aggression towards his mother. During his school years, Kuzmenko was fond of sports and was considered popular among his peers and neighbors. In order to assert himself, he often fought and beat up older boys.

After graduating from school, he received a secondary vocational education as a carpenter. In the early 1990s, he was drafted into the Ukrainian Air Assault Forces, and after demobilization, he returned to the Kyiv Oblast and changed several jobs, mostly working as a low-skilled laborer. Throughout the years, he is known to have worked as a carpenter, tower crane operator, cab driver and security guard.

In the late 1990s, Kuzmenko got married and had two children, but the marriage did not work out and he soon divorced his wife, instead moving in with another woman, Olga Vanyukhova, who had a son from a previous marriage. Prior to his arrest, they lived on Yasnaya Street in the city of Boiarka.

In 2002, Kuzmenko was arrested for a robbery committed near the Hryshko National Botanical Garden in Kyiv, for which he was convicted and sentenced to a year in prison. During his prison stint he worked as a carpenter, and was paroled after eight months for good behavior. He then returned to Boiarka, where he retained a good reputation among friends and acquaintances.

== Murders ==
=== Modus operandi ===
Sometime after his release from prison, Kuzmenko started committing murders, all of which he did in using a certain modus operandi. Driving around in his Lada Riva, he would look for potential victims on the streets or at public transportation stops, and would then offer them a ride. Alternatively, he would outright ambush them near woods or on the outskirts of villages near railroad tracks and train stations. Due to his tall stature, athletic build and attractive appearance, he easily earned the trust and comfort of victims.

If he found a potential victim, Kuzmenko would drive to a deserted area where he would rape the victim, only killing them if he was sure they had seen his face clearly. He strangled most of the victims, and is known to have stabbed to death only one. Most of the attacks were committed along the Kyiv-Fastiv train route in the Kyiv-Sviatoshyn and Vasylkiv Raions.

In terms of victim preference, Kuzmenko's only apparent criteria was if the victim was female – he demonstrated no apparent preference for age, height, social status, ethnicity or any other category. Most of the times he acted in a very organized manner, planning ambushes and even constructing temporary huts to wait for a potential victim, but occasionally just attacked spontaneously and without premeditation.

=== Proven crimes ===
Date of attack	Victim	Age	Location	Additional notes
26 May 2000	Unnamed	Unknown	Kyiv	Robbery
24 September 2001	Unnamed	Unknown	Kyiv	Robbery
10 August 2003	Unnamed	Unknown	Hatne	Robbery/Rape
27 August 2003	Unnamed	Unknown	Vyshneve	Rape of a female security guard
28 August 2003	Unnamed	Unknown	Kriukivshchyna	Rape of a female security guard
9 June 2004	Unnamed	Unknown	Kriukivshchyna	Rape committed while working as a boiler room guard
10 March 2005	Unnamed	"young"	Korchi	Robbery/Rape. The victim testified that she was riding on a train and noticed Kuzmenko, to whom she took a liking. After arriving at the train station in Korchi, she started walking to the village and went through a forest – at that time, Kuzmenko, clad in a stocking and gloves, attacked, raped and robbed her. During her testimony, the victim claimed that the attacker resembled American singer Elvis Presley, and the identikit reflected that, leading to the attacker getting the moniker "Elvis".
25 May 2005	Lidiya Ivanovna Ditkovskaya	68	Hlevakha	Robbery/Rape/Manslaughter. On that date, Kuzmenko set up an ambush in some bushes along a forest trail before attacking Ditkovskaya as she was returning to her dacha. He hit her on the head, dragged her into the bushes and raped her, but claimed that he had no intent of killing her. However, Ditkovskaya suffered a heart attack and succumbed to her injuries a few minutes later. The woman's body was found a few days later, but police refused to open an investigation, as they erroneously believed it was a death from natural causes and that the reason why the woman had taken off her panties was because of the heat.
16 June 2005	Unnamed	Unknown	Malyutinka	Robbery/Rape
6 August 2005	Unnamed	Unknown	Vyshneve	Robbery/Rape
18 August 2005	Unnamed	Unknown	Malyutinka	Robbery/Rape
20 August 2005	Unnamed	Unknown	Korchi	Robbery/Rape
19 June 2006	"Guida"	"young"	Trostinka	Rape/Murder. Kuzmenko met her on the outskirts of Vasylkiv and offered to give her a ride to Trostinka. Instead, he drove Guida to an abandoned airfield, where he raped and strangled her after she threatened to call the police. He left the body in a patch of thick grass, and it was discovered later on while it was being mowed. Due to the severe state of decomposition, coroners were unable to conclusively determine what the cause of death was. Kuzmenko admitted to this murder only after his arrest, claiming that he felt a "strange sensation" that caused him to start killing his victims more frequently.
early September 2006	Unnamed	Unknown	Malyutinka	Rape
late March 2007	"Jane Doe"	Unknown	Kalynivka	Rape/Murder
2 April 2007	Unnamed	Unknown	Korchi	Robbery/Rape
April 2007	Unnamed	50	Malyutinka	Robbery/Attempted rape. Victim was a former track and field athlete who was dragged off into a nearby forest with the intent of being raped, but managed to distract her assailant by offering to pay him with the money in her bag. When Kuzmenko picked up her bag from the ground, the victim broke free and started running. Kuzmenko chased after her but was unable to catch up – once she felt she was at a safe distance, the victim demanded that he return her driver's license, but he refused and ran away.
8 May 2007	"Naduk"	Unknown	Korchi	Robbery/Rape/Murder
9 May 2007	"Sukhetskaya"	Unknown	Malyutinka	Robbery/Rape/Murder. On that day, Kuzmenko was riding on a commuter train and saw through a window that Sukhetskaya was walking by herself, picking flowers near the train station. After getting off at the station and making sure that there was nobody around, Kuzmenko attacked Sukhetskaya and dragged her off to the woods, where he raped her at gunpoint and then strangled her with a lanyard.
30 May 2007	Unnamed	Unknown	Malyutinka	Robbery/Attempted rape. Kuzmenko was scared off.
4 June 2007	Unnamed	Unknown	Undisclosed	Robbery
5 June 2007	Unnamed	80	Borova	Robbery/Rape/Attempted murder. On the day of the attack, Kuzmenko claimed that he had gotten lost while driving along the forest roads and accidentally came across the victim while she was picking mushrooms. Upon seeing her, he got out of the car, crept up behind her and threw her to the ground, whereupon he raped, beat and attempted to strangle her. The woman lost consciousness during the assault and Kuzmenko, believing that she was dead, left the area. The woman later regained consciousness and crawled until she came by a forester friend of hers. She was then driven to a hospital and treated, but unknown reasons, the local police refused to initiate an investigation into the attack.
11 June 2007	"Stepanushko"	Unknown	Vasylkiv	Rape/Murder
14 June 2007	Unnamed	Unknown	Malyutinka	Robbery. Kuzmenko injured the victim's arm while snatching her bag.
August 2007	"Donchenko"	Unknown	Boiarka	Robbery/Rape/Murder
10 September 2007	Nina Maksimovna Korneeva	69	Malyutinka	Robbery/Rape/Murder. Kuzmenko came across the victim while walking through a forest road after stepping off a train. He claimed to have forgotten the stocking he used as a mask at home, and instead decided to attack Korneeva with his face fully visible, initially intent on letting her live. However, he said that at one point Korneeva turned around and looked him directly in the eyes, prompting him to stab her several times with a knife.
5 October 2007	Unnamed	Unknown	Malyutinka	Robbery/Rape
2 June 2008	"Sochenko"	Unknown	Korchi	Robbery/Rape/Murder
11 September 2008	"Bilous"	Unknown	Boiarka	Robbery/Rape/Murder
17 November 2008	"Metelskaya"	Unknown	Trostinka	Robbery/Rape/Murder
23 December 2008	Raisa Petrenko	Unknown	Barakhty	Robbery/Rape/Murder. Kuzmenko picked up Petrenko, an employee at a local market, from a bus stop in Vasylkiv. He then drove her to the forest, where he raped and strangled her before dumping her body in a field.
13 January 2009	Anya Bondar	19	Barakhty	Robbery/Rape/Murder. Kuzmenko met Bondar at a bus stop in Vasylkiv and offered to drive her to her desired destination. Instead, he drove her to an deserted area, where he raped and strangled her. She was his last known victim.

== Investigation ==
As the murders continued, a specialized task force was set up to investigate them, headed by the Kyiv Prosecutor's Office and the Ministry of Internal Affairs. More than 10,000 people were investigated as potential suspects and several thousand cars were checked, but few clues came about as to the killer's identity.

The first time the theory of a serial killer was put forward was in 2007, when investigator Vasyl Paskal determined through a DNA test that the same was responsible for at least three of the murders in the Vasylkiv Raion. The killings were combined into one case at the turn of 2009, after further inspection of the crime scenes led investigators to conclude that five of the murders were linked to the same perpetrator. Since most of them were committed at a considerable distance from railway stations, the agencies requested satellite images of the areas from NATO. Investigator Ruslan Sushko later stated that NATO provided the Ukrainian agencies many images, paying $1,250 per image. With these images, they concluded that the killer drove either a Moskvitch or a Lada Riva that was either green, blue or red in color. In order to capture the perpetrator, the agencies organized several operations across wooded areas.

Following Bondar's murder, a witness came forward that provided crucial information. The man, a cab driver and former senior police inspector who knew the victim personally, said that he saw her enter a green-colored Lada Riva that was either 5th or 7th generation. In addition, he remembered one part of the license plate, the letters "VI". Based on this information, the investigators started searching for any such cars across the country. Out of a total 7,043 cars, only 50 were registered in the Kyiv Oblast – Kuzmenko was never considered a suspect, as he drove the car by power of attorney, and the real owner had an alibi for the day of Bondar's murder. After this, Paskal ordered that the investigators make a special questionnaire and distribute it across the Kyiv-Svyatoshynskyi and Vasylkiv Raions.

In May of the same year, law enforcement officers came to the house of Yuriy Kuzmenko in Boiarka, where they talked with him and found out that he was driving such a car. During the conversation, Kuzmenko, at the insistence of a local district police officer, gave a saliva sample for examination. His sample proved be a match, leading officers to consider detaining him for further questioning. However, Kuzmenko felt threatened after the visit, gathered his belongings and fled. While searching his house and garage, investigators found a bag with women's underwear of different sizes and styles, some of which had bloodstains.

After he fled, Kuzmenko's wife gave law enforcement officers the address of his sister and brother's residences in Barakhty and Kyiv, where they soon organized ambushes. Initially, Kuzmenko hid at his sister's house, before traveling to Kyiv to visit his brother.

== Arrest, investigation and trial ==
On 29 May 2006, Kuzmenko was arrested without incident at the doorstep of his brother's house in Kyiv. During the first interrogation, Kuzmenko expressed his willingness to cooperate with the investigation and confessed to 11 murders. In the following days, he was escorted to the crime scenes to provide a reconstruction of how he carried out the murders. In order to ensure his safety and prevent reprisals from angry locals, Kuzmenko was forced to wear a helmet and armor, and was escorted not only by local law enforcement, but also by members of the Berkut and Kobra special forces.

When pressed for a motive, Kuzmenko claimed that he started developing an inferiority complex at the turn of 2000, deciding to spend most of his time in the woods to reassert himself. At around that time, he started committing robberies and rapes, initially leaving the victims alive, but with time, he developed an addiction to killing. He was unable to explain what caused him to sexually assault the elderly victims, nor why he did not wear a condom during the rapes, despite knowing that leaving traces of his semen would eventually lead to his capture.

Once the investigation was completed, Kuzmenko was charged with 13 murders, several of the rapes and multiple robberies, with the case file totaling more than 140 volumes. The trial began in the spring of 2011 and was held behind closed doors. On 25 May 2011, Kuzmenko was found guilty on all counts and sentenced to life imprisonment. During sentencing, he expressed no visible emotion, despite the fact that he appeared listless and disinterested throughout the court sessions.

== Aftermath and current status ==
Following his conviction, Kuzmenko was transferred to the Romenskoye Colony No. 56 in Vyshneve, where he remains to this day.

Ever since his conviction, there has been a debate about the true number of Kuzmenko's victims. He himself claimed to have murdered a total 206 young girls and women, and while most investigators believed this to be an embellished number, the task force was forced to admit that there were multiple cases where prosecutors refused to press charges against Kuzmenko. One example involved an 18-year-old woman that went missing from a disco during the winter, only to be found dead in a pond soon afterwards. Authorities refused to press charges, as they believed that the girl died by suicide.

According to the head of the Kyiv Special Task Force, the bodies of around 56 young girls and women were found around the area in early 2008, some of whom were suspected to be victims of Kuzmenko. However, since he had a poor memory and struggled to recall details about the victims, they were unable to conclusively link him to most of these crimes. Investigator Ruslan Sushko also speculated that some victims' remains might have been scattered by wild animals or buried by local police officers to improve solved crime statistics, a practice that Sushko claimed was standard for regional law enforcement agencies.

== See also ==
- List of serial killers by country
- List of serial rapists

== In the media and culture ==
Kuzmenko's crimes were covered on the episode Elvis, the Strangler from Boiarka (Ukrainian: Елвіс-душитель з Боярка) from the TV series Criminal Ukraine (Ukrainian: Кримінальна Україна).
