= Kyiv-Sviatoshyn Raion =

Former subdivision of Kyiv Oblast, Ukraine

Kyiv-Sviatoshyn Raion Києво-Святошинський район
- Raion
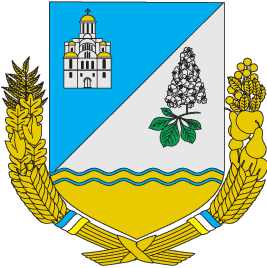
- Flag Coat of arms

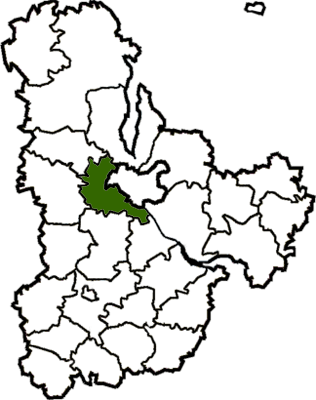
- Coordinates: 50°23′23″N 30°14′5″E
- Country: Ukraine
- Region: Kyiv Oblast
- Disestablished: 18 July 2020
- Admin. center: Kyiv
- Subdivisions: List: — city councils; — settlement councils; — rural councils; Number of localities: — cities; — urban-type settlements; 49 — villages; — rural settlements

Population (2020)
  - Total: 210,123
- Time zone: UTC+02:00 (EET)
  - Summer (DST): UTC+03:00 (EEST)
- Area code: +380

Kyiv-Sviatoshyn Raion (Ukrainian: Києво-Святошинський район, romanized: Kyievo-Sviatoshynskyi raion) was a raion (district) in Kyiv Oblast of Ukraine, adjacent to the city of Kyiv which served as the administrative center for the raion. The city of Kyiv itself did not belong to the raion. The raion was abolished on 18 July 2020 as part of the administrative reform of Ukraine, which reduced the number of raions of Kyiv Oblast to seven. The area of Kyiv-Sviatoshyn Raion was split between Bucha, Fastiv, and Obukhiv Raions. The last estimate of the raion population was 210,123 (2020 est.).

The raion was situated just to the west of the city of Kyiv, and should not be confused with the Sviatoshyn District of Kyiv city, which it bordered and where its administration was located. The raion's name related to the historical area and woodland of Sviatoshyn, which currently is located with the city limits of Kyiv.

== Geography ==
Most of the Raion was located within the Polesie lowland, while its southeastern portion belonged to the Dnieper Upland. The woodland area of the raion covered 4,700 ha (12,000 acres) and the agricultural land area covered 30,700 ha (76,000 acres). Several areas of nature conservation were located there, including Zhornivskyi (ornithological) Reserve and Zhukiv Khutir (dendrological).

== Subdivisions ==
At the time of disestablishment, the raion consisted of eight hromadas:

- Bilohorodka rural hromada with the administration in the selo of Bilohorodka, transferred to Bucha Raion;
- Boiarka urban hromada with the administration in the city of Boiarka, transferred to Fastiv Raion;
- Borshchahivka rural hromada with the administration in the selo of Sofiivska Borshchahivka, transferred to Bucha Raion;
- Chabany settlement hromada with the administration in the urban-type settlement of Chabany, transferred to Fastiv Raion;
- Dmytrivka rural hromada with the administration in the selo of Dmytrivka, transferred to Bucha Raion;
- Feodosiivska rural hromada with the administration in the selo of Khodosivka, transferred to Obukhiv Raion;
- Hatne rural hromada with the administration in the selo of Hatne, transferred to Fastiv Raion;
- Vyshneve urban hromada with the administration in the city of Vyshneve, transferred to Bucha Raion.

== History ==
Established in 1937, Kyiv-Sviatoshyn Raion bordered Borodianka Raion and Vyshhorod Raion to the north, Vasylkiv Raion and Obukhiv Raion to the south, Makariv Raion to the west, and with the city of Kyiv to the east.

In the 1960s, the urban area of the raion to the north around the city of Irpin was divided into a separate administrative unit known as a city of regional significance, Irpin and includes a number of other urban settlements. The Irpin city of regional significance is known for its Antonov Aviation Center, located in Hostomel, where the Hostomel Airport is located.

On 25 February 2022, one day after the beginning of the Russian invasion of Ukraine, the Battle of Kyiv started. On 2 April, Ukrainian authorities claimed that the entire Kyiv region had been recaptured.

== Economy and infrastructure ==
In all areas of industry 36,872 persons were employed, including: manufacturing industry – 8494, agrarian industry – 3,614 people, government – 918 people in other areas – 23,846 people.

The raion had companies of such industries like light, food, chemical and petroleum, manufacturing various non-metal mineral products, metallurgy, engineering, and other manufacturing and machine maintenance.

There were number of research centers, including the Research and Design Bureau of General Aviation, the Naftogaz Ukrayiny research institute of petro-gas industry, and others.

=== Agrarian industry ===
The agrarian industry was among the leading in the raion and possibly for that purpose there were number of agricultural research centers such as NAASU (Note: National Academy of Agrarian Sciences of Ukraine) Institute of Land Cultivation, NAASU Institute of Gardening, Kyiv regional technical and planning center in ensuring of soil fertility and products quality, Boyarka Forest Research Station, and many others. The agrarian industry specialized in growing of grain, vegetables, production of meat and dairy.

In the area there were 28 agricultural enterprises, including: NDVAK "Pushcha Voditsa" (Kyiv), ALLC AF "Bilogorodka" (v. Bilogorodka), ALLC "Buzivske" (v. Buzova) ALLC AK "Tarasivska "(v. Tarasivka) ALLC AK" Hotivskyy "(v.Khotiv), ALLC" Ahrolend "(v. Shpitki), JV" Bucha "(v. Gostomel) Ltd AF" Knyazhychi "(v. Knyazhychi) Ltd. Firm "Kryukivschyna" (v. Kryukivschyna), SGK "Rubezhivskyy" (v. Michalivska Rubezhivka), PE "Amaranth-Agro" (v. Dmitrovka) PDP "Gito" (v. Gorenichi) PDP "Shevchenko" (v. Gorenichi), PE "Agrosvit" (v. Novosilky) Ltd AF "Ahroma" (v. Petropavlivska Borschagivka), OJSC "Kyiv vegetable factory" (Kyiv), OJSC "Plodorozsadnytske" (v. Petrivske), JSC "Zabir'ya "(v. Zabir'ya), JSC" ornamental culture "(Boyarka) DG" Dmitrovka "(v. Dmitrovka) DG" Novosilky "(v. Novosilky) DG" Chabany "( Chabany ), NDH "Vorzel" (Vorzel) SSE "Chaika" branch "Lisne" (v. Lisne), auxiliary facilities "Bobritsa" (v. Bobritsa) Branch "Antonov – Agro" DPANTK named by Antonov (island Kruglik).

=== Education and healthcare ===
Education and healthcare sectors as throughout Ukraine are controlled majorly by government.

Education in the district was represented by the one higher education institution of I-II levels of accreditation and 38 day schools of general (the number of students – 14 061), 37 pre-school institutions (number of children – 4912), 5 children's post-school institutions (involved 6,196 children) Medicine

In the area there were 44 medical institutions (clinics, ambulatories, health centers), 6 precinct hospitals, 1 city, 1 District, 17 primary health centers. Of the health of residents cared about 3500 workers.

=== Infrastructure ===
The population of the raion's settlements was small. Among the biggest populated places were the cities of Boyarka and Vyshneve which do not exceed 40,000 residents each. The rest of the settlements have a population of 5,000 or less. The urban sprawl of Kyiv infringes into the raion and many settlements while categorized as villages have residential clusters with multi-story panel-houses of the Soviet or Soviet-like design. With the ongoing demographic crisis in Ukraine, Kyiv and its vicinities among which is the Kyiv-Sviatoshyn Raion experiencing an increase in population which is related to the Russian-Ukrainian armed conflict (see Russian military intervention in Ukraine (2014–present)).

The raion has adequately developed transportation infrastructure. Through the Kyiv-Sviatoshyn Raion passes a number of national routes Kyiv–Lviv and Kyiv–Odesa. The railway network belongs to the Southwestern Railways of Ukraine. Many cities near Kyiv were developed around rail stations among which are Irpin, Vyshneve, and others. Beside the Hostomel Airport, there are a number of smaller airfields throughout the Kyiv-Sviatoshyn Raion.

In a dacha settlement of Chaika, which is situated in Petropavlivska Borshchahivka, is located a big sports complex consisting of a sports field for association football, car racing track, and others. There have been some attempts to establish professional football clubs in Boyarka (Inter) and Vyshneve (Transimpeks), yet most of them failed so far.

=== Tourism ===
The raion had a number of historical landmarks related to the history of the Kyiv region. In the village of Shpytky, there were remnants of Tereshchenko estate which belonged to the family of Ukrainian (Little Russian) entrepreneurs of Imperial Russia. Near the village of Bilhorodka, there was an archaeological excavation which is believed to be related to the legendary city of Bilhorod, which is mentioned in chronicles as Bilhorod Kyivskyi. Throughout the raion, there were remnants of the Soviet fortified district (so called Kyiv Ukrip-Raion) in the form of so-called the "Long-term Defense Points" (DOTs, see Pillbox (military)). Many of them were simply left by the Stalinist troops during the 1941 battle of Kyiv (also known as the Kyiv Cauldron).

== Administration ==
The raion administration consisted of legislative, executive and judicial branches of government.

The legislation was represented by the Kyiv-Sviatoshyn Raion council.

The executive authorities were represented by the Kyiv-Sviatoshyn Raion State Administration.

The judicial branch was represented by a local district court.
