= List of original programs broadcast by Kyivstrar TB =

Kyivstar TB (Ukrainian: Київстар ТБ, short for Kyivstar Telebachennya lit. 'Kyivstar TV') is a Ukrainian streaming service created as a joint effort between the mobile service operator Kyivstar and the media conglomerate 1+1 Media Group. Originally intended to provide an easily accsesible and legal way for consumption of Ukrainian pieces of media (as well as popular non-Ukrainian films and TV series with a professionally produced dub), it was Ukraine's third streaming service on the domestic market (with the first two being Takflix and Sweet. tv). In 2024, Kyivstar announced production on its first original series, which was coproduced with the TV network NTN (Національні Телевізійні Новини, lit. National Television News) on the scripted live-action television series Border Guards, the first season of which would start streaming on October 1, 2024 and air on NTN December 2 the same year. In 2025, Kyivstar TB would announce its first fully original series, the comedy drama Vitya, which is currently in its second season.

== Scripted ==
Former
Title	Genre	Creator(s)	Number of seasons	Original airdates	Status	Notes
Border Guards (Прикордонники)	Action, adventure, drama, war	Mykola Kutzyk	2	October 1, 2024 – December 5, 2025	Concluded	The first season was coproduced with the TV network NTN. After the latter cancelled the series, Kyivstar TB picked it up for a second and final season
Vitya (Вітя)	Comedy drama	Maksym Susida	2	1 September 2025-2 April 2026	Concluded	Based on Susida's 2024 award-winning short film of the same name
Cardamon Coffee (Кава з кардамоном)	Period drama, romance, comedy drama	Olena Lavrenyuk	2	1 December 2025	Concluded	The first season was produced and aired by the Ukrainian TV network STB in 2021 (with it starting its initial broadcast on 20 December 2021) and was based on the 2013 novel The Coffee Melody in the Key of Cardamom (Мелодія кави у тональності кардамону) by Nataliya Gurnytska. The second season (a joint production between STB and Kyivstar TB) does not adapt the original novel's 2016 sequel The Coffee Melody in the Key of Hope (Мелодія кави в тональності сподівання), but, rather features a show-original story with the majority of the first season's characters (albeit with a far lighter tone than that of the first season)
Silent Nava (Тиха Нава)	Mystery, thriller, drama, crime, neo-noir	Dmytro Andriyanov, Artem Kobzan	1 (miniseries)	15 January 2026	Concluded	Originally titled Enrique and pitched as an adaptation of the 2020 novel I See You Are Interested in Darkness (Я бачу, вас цікавить пітьма) by llarion Pavliuk, however, that idea had been abanndoned not far into the writing process, with the series creators taking heavy inspiration from the documentaries on the case of serial killer and rapist Yuriy Kuzmenko and opting for a much more neo-noir inspired route in terms of storytelling and visual presentation
The Brave Girl (Відважна дівчина)	Action, adventure, thriller, romance, drama, crime	Oleksandr Salnikov	1 (miniseries)	3 September 2026	Concluded	
My New Personal Shoreline (Мій новий берег)	Romance, drama	Tetyana Hnedash	1 (miniseries)	17 September 2026	Concluded	

Upcoming programming (scripted)
Title	Genre	Creator(s)	Start of airing	Notes
I Just Sat Down (Тільки сіла)	Comedy drama	Alina Rudya	TBA	The first Ukrainian vertical series
Early Birds: New Reality (Перші ластівки. Нова реальність)	Teen drama, mystery, thriller, crime	Yevhen Tunik	TBA	A revival of the 2019 series which aired on the TV network Novyi Kanal for two seasons before the filming having been cancelled due to the start of the Russo-Ukrainian War, which, unlike the second season, is going to be a direct continuation of the first. The series is coproduced by Novyi Kanal
