= Sofiivska Borshchahivka =

Village in Kyiv Oblast, Ukraine

Sofiivska Borshchahivka Софіївська Борщагівка
- Village
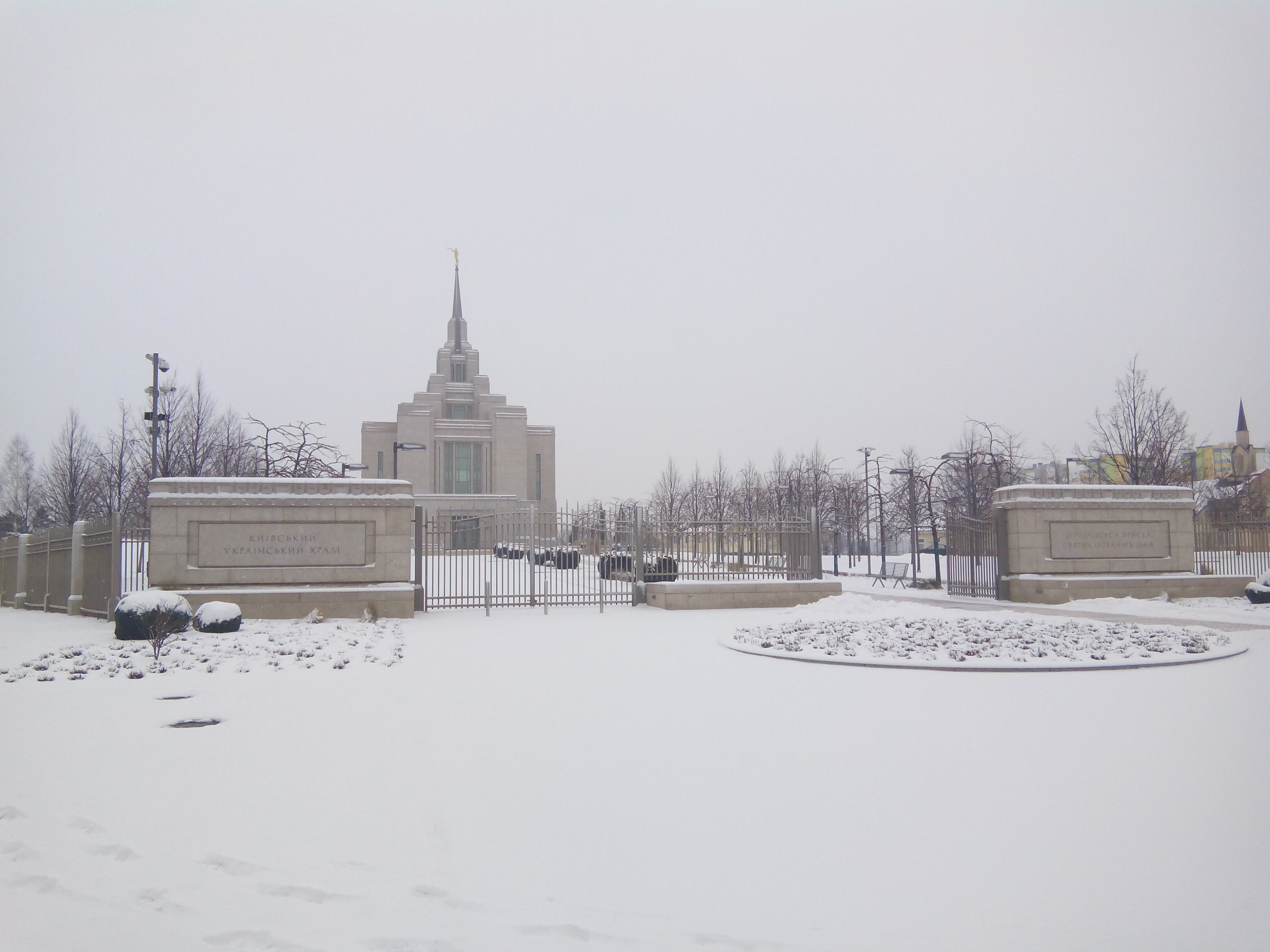

- Flag Coat of arms

- Location within Kyiv Oblast Location within Ukraine
- Coordinates: 50°24′41″N 30°22′09″E
- Country: Ukraine
- Oblast: Kyiv Oblast
- Raion: Bucha Raion
- Hromada: Borshchahivka rural hromada
- Founded: 1497

Area
  - Land: 10.98 km^{2} (4.24 sq mi)
- Elevation: 160 m (520 ft)

Population
  - Total: 25 882
  - Density: 1,441.01/km^{2} (3,732.2/sq mi)
- Postal code: 08131

Sofiivska Borshchahivka (Ukrainian: Софіївська Борщагівка) is a village in Bucha Raion, Kyiv Oblast, Ukraine. It belongs to Borshchahivka rural hromada.

Sofiivska Borshchahivka is a suburb of Kyiv, separated from the city by the Kiltseva Road (ring road). It borders Petropavlivska Borshchahivka to the north and Vyshneve to the south.

== Name ==
The first part of the name means "Sophia" (adj.) and comes from Saint Sophia Cathedral, which owned the territory of the village.

The second part of the name is shared with the neighboring village Petropavlivska Borshchahivka and Kyiv neighborhood Borshchahivka.

== History ==
The village was founded in 1497.

Sofiivska Borshchahivka was known since 16th century as the property of Saint Sophia Cathedral. In 1590, Michael Rohoza, the Metropolitan of Kyiv, granted a charter to "the peasant Yefym Oleshkovych" for "leasehold possession of the land" belonging to St. Sophia Cathedral. From 1937 to 2020, the village was a part of the Kyiv-Sviatoshyn Raion, until its dissolution. Since then, Sofiivska Borshchahivka is a part of Bucha Raion.

In August 2010, the Kyiv Ukraine Temple, the first Ukrainian temple of the Church of Jesus Christ of Latter-Day Saints, was opened in Sofiivska Borshchahivka.

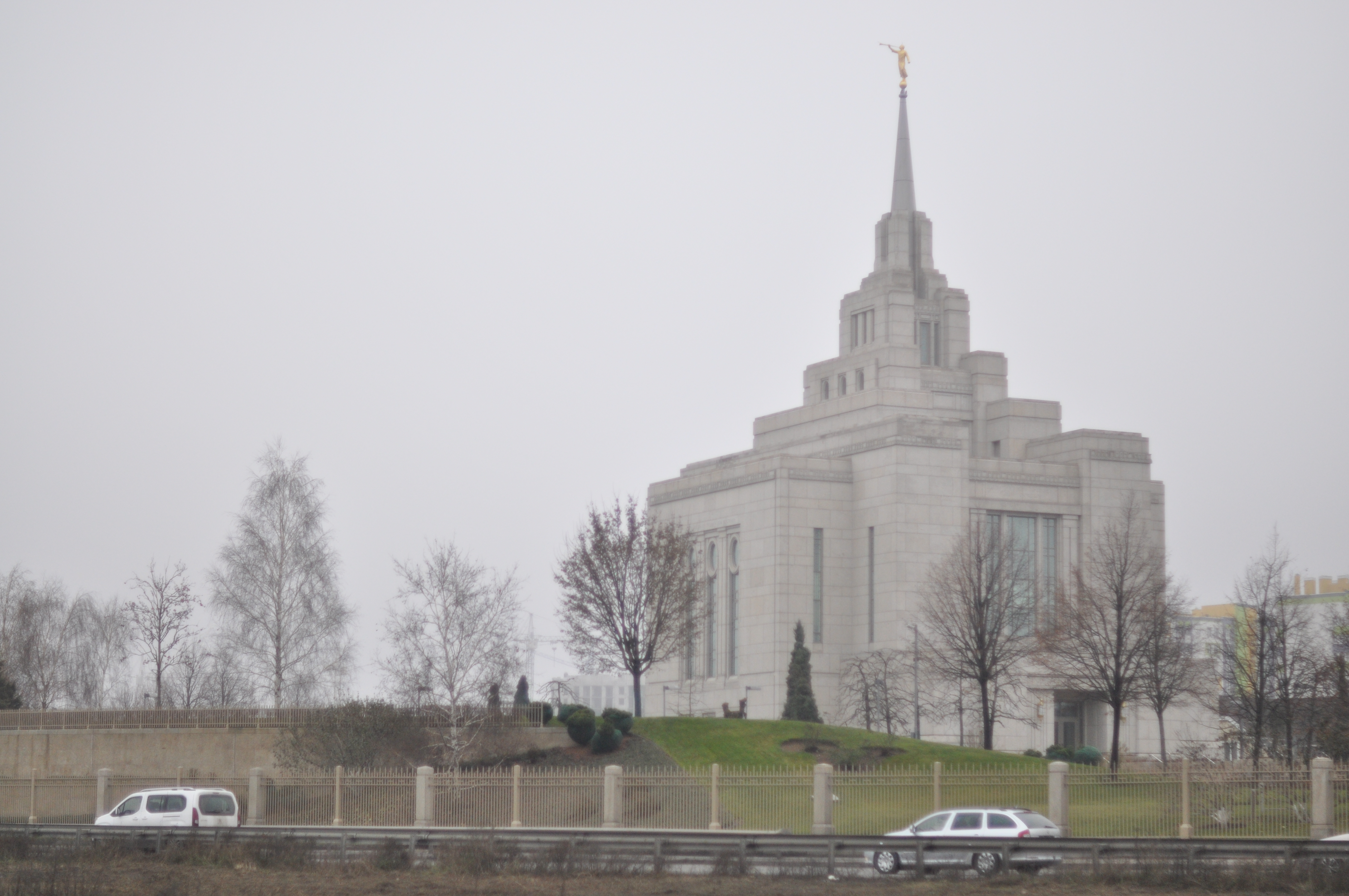
Kyiv Ukraine Temple

On 29 September 2018, the Metropolitan bishop of Pereiaslav and Bila Tserkva Epiphanius consecrated the Church of Holy Martyrs Faith, Hope and Love and Their Mother Sophia.

== Demographics ==
According to the 2001 Ukrainian census, the population is 6,569 people. In 2022, the population was estimated to be 25,882 people, which makes Sofiivska Borshchahivka the largest village in Ukraine. The linguistic composition of the local population as of the census was as follows:

Native languages in Sofiivska Borshchahivka
	percent
Ukrainian	94.7%
Russian	4.6%
Belarusian	0.2%
Polish	0.1%
others	0.4%

== Notable people ==
- Hryhorii Shupyk (1915–1992), Soviet military pilot
- Serhii Budnyk (born 1965), Ukrainian lawyer and police general
- Serhii Ilchenko (1982–2015), sergeant of the Armed Forces of Ukraine
