= Chabany =

Rural locality in Kyiv Oblast, Ukraine

Chabany Чабани
- Rural settlement
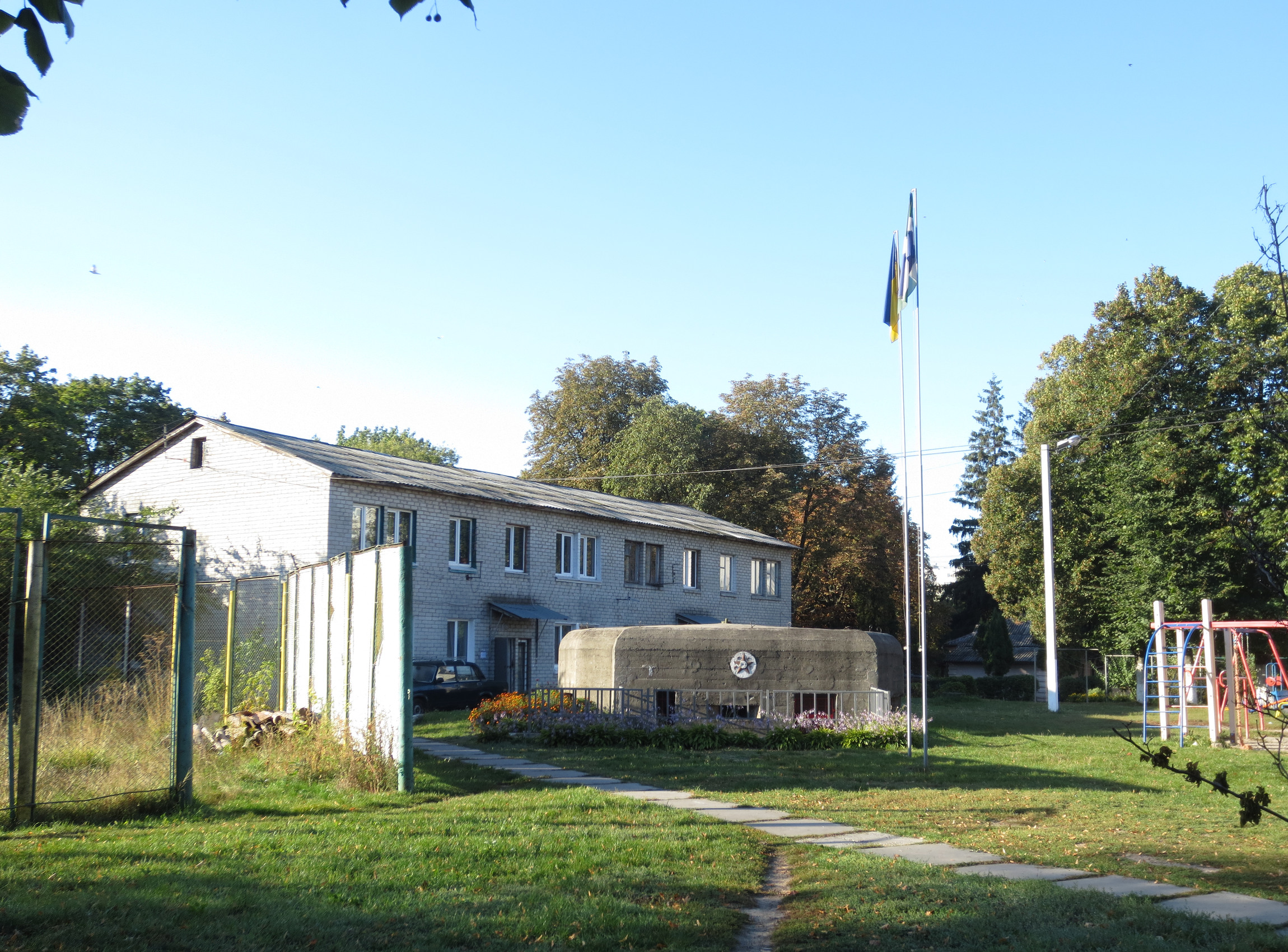

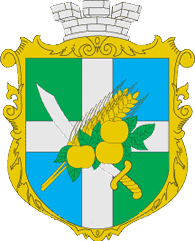
- Flag Coat of arms

- Location within Kyiv Oblast Location within Ukraine
- Coordinates: 50°20′25″N 30°25′22″E
- Country: Ukraine
- Oblast: Kyiv
- Raion: Fastiv Raion
- Established: 1670

Population (2022)
  - Total: 5,334
- Time zone: UTC+2 (EET)
  - Summer (DST): UTC+3 (EEST)
- Postcode: 08162
- Area code: +380 44, +380 4598

Chabany (Ukrainian: Чабани) is a rural settlement in Fastiv Raion of Kyiv Oblast (province), located on the southern border of Kyiv. It hosts the administration of Chabany settlement hromada, one of the hromadas of Ukraine. Population: 5,334 (2022 estimate).

== History ==
Until 18 July 2020, Chabany belonged to Kyiv-Sviatoshyn Raion. The raion was abolished that day as part of the administrative reform of Ukraine, which reduced the number of raions of Kyiv Oblast to seven. The area of Kyiv-Sviatoshyn Raion was split between Bucha, Fastiv, and Obukhiv Raions, with Chabany being transferred to Fastiv Raion.

Until 26 January 2024, Chabany was designated urban-type settlement. On this day, a new law entered into force which abolished this status, and Chabany became a rural settlement.

== Demographics ==
As of the All-Ukrainian census in 2001, Chabany had a population of 3,650 inhabitants. The linguistic composition of the settlement was as follows:

Native languages in Chabany
	percent
Ukrainian	92.3%
Russian	7.2%
Belarusian	0.2%
Bulgarian	0.1%
Armenian	0.1%
others	0.1%
