= Petropavlivska Borshchahivka =

Petropavlivska Borshchahivka Петропавлівська Борщагівка
- Village
- Flag Seal

- Location within Kyiv Oblast Location within Ukraine
- Coordinates: 50°26′01.8″N 30°19′42.8″E
- Country: Ukraine
- Oblast: Kyiv Oblast
- Raion: Bucha Raion
- Hromada: Borshchahivka rural hromada
- First mentioned: 1497

Area
  - Total: 25.03 km^{2} (9.66 sq mi)

Population (2001)
  - Total: 6,485
  - Density: 259.1/km^{2} (671.0/sq mi)
- Time zone: UTC+2 (EET)
  - Summer (DST): UTC+3 (EEST)
- Postal code: 08129, 08130
- Area code: +380 4598
- Website: http://ppborshchagivka.at.ua/

Petropavlivska Borshchahivka (Ukrainian: Петропавлівська Борщагівка) is a village in Bucha Raion of Kyiv Oblast (province) of Ukraine. It belongs to Borshchahivka rural hromada, one of the hromadas of Ukraine.

== History ==
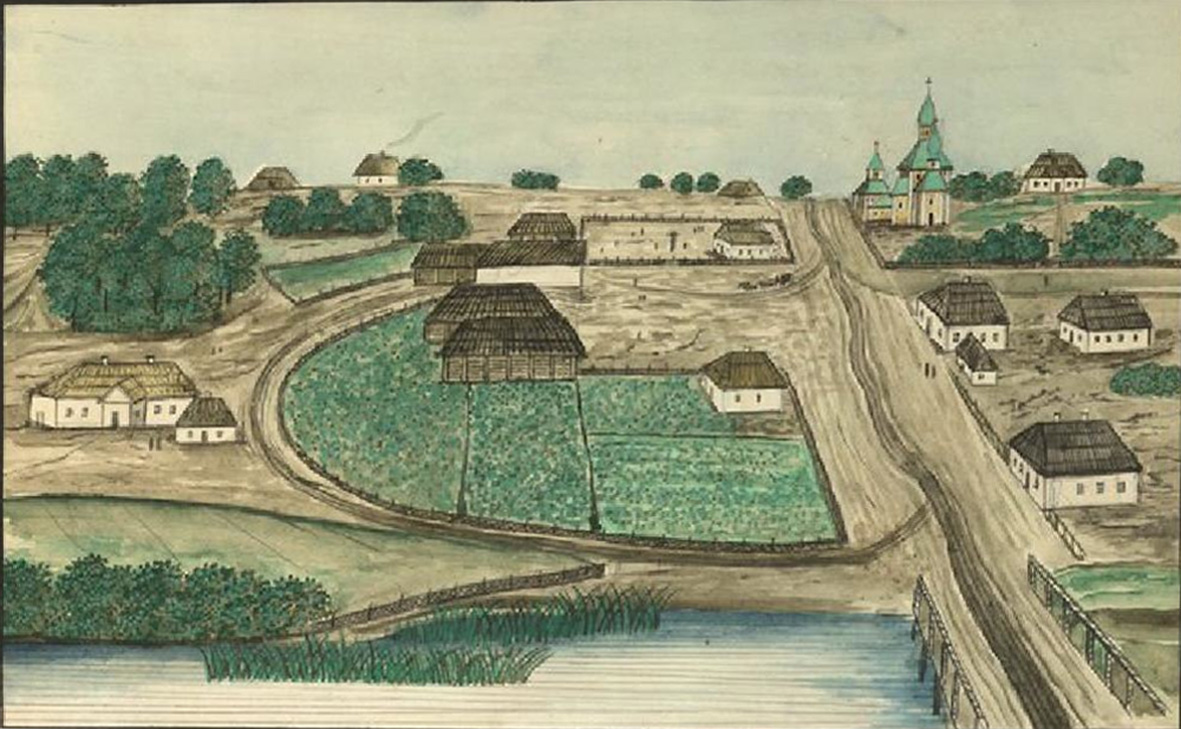
De la Fliz. Petropavlivska Borshchahivka (1854)

Founded in 1113.

According to the Geographical Dictionary of the Kingdom of Poland in 1497 the village was passed by the Grand Duke of Lithuania Alexander Jagiellon to Kyiv monasteries.

The name of the village originates from the river ″Borshchahivka″ (today also known as Nyvky) over which the village is located, and the Petropavlivskiy Dominican monastery, which in turn got its name from two apostles: Peter and Paul).

In total around the city of Kyiv, there were five villages named as Borshchahivka, three of which today are merged into the city limits of Kyiv.

Until 18 July 2020, Petropavlivska Borshchahivka belonged to Kyiv-Sviatoshyn Raion. The raion was abolished that day as part of the administrative reform of Ukraine, which reduced the number of raions of Kyiv Oblast to seven. The area of Kyiv-Sviatoshyn Raion was split between Bucha, Fastiv, and Obukhiv raions, with Petropavlivska Borshchahivka being transferred to Bucha Raion.

== Present day Petropavlivska Borshchahivka ==
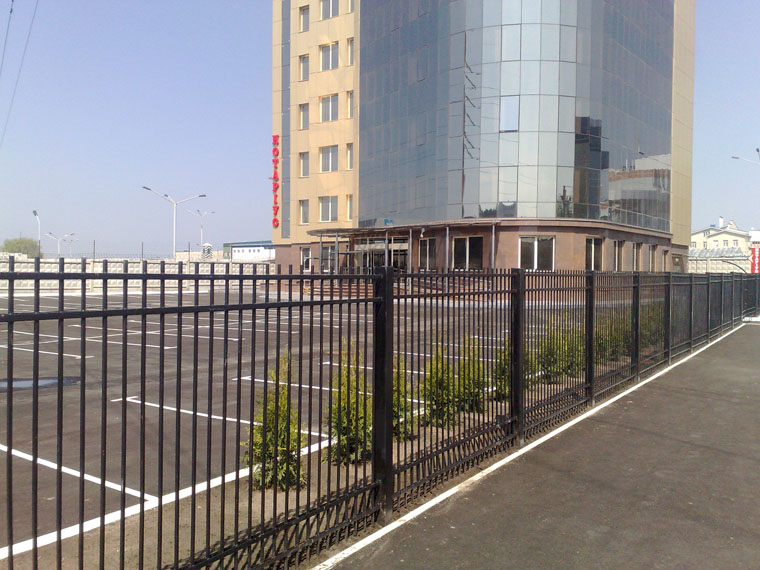
Photos of the territory near BC Golden Center

Due to its favorable geographical location, at the beginning of the 21st century village became one of the largest and wealthiest villages in Ukraine. Modern business centers have appeared in the village, high-rise buildings have been built, and new establishments are operating.

=== Education and sports ===
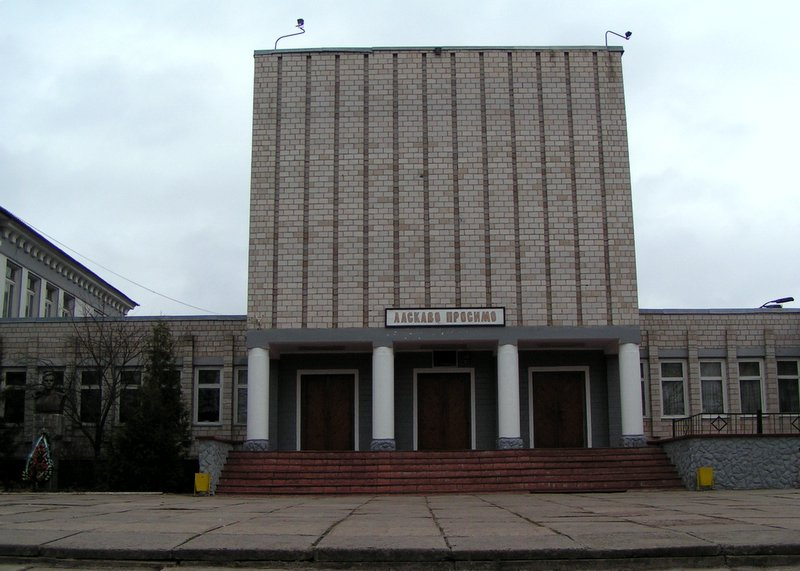
school

The village has a school and a kindergarten.

In 2009 the school stadium was reconstructed, a modern football field with artificial turf was created. The village football team "Chaika" successfully plays in the regional championship. The school team played in the semi-finals of the National School Football Cup "Euro-2012".

Near Petropavlivska Borshchahivka (in the village of Chaiky) there is a car sports complex "Chaika" – one of the leading centers of motorsport in the country.

=== Transport ===
Kiltseva road runs along the eastern border of the village.

== Demographics ==
As of the 2001 Ukrainian census, Petropavlivska Borshchahivka had a population of 6,125 inhabitants. The linguistic composition of the settlement was as follows:

Native languages in Petropavlivska Borshchahivka
	percent
Ukrainian	94.9%
Russian	4.6%
Belarusian	0.1%
Armenian	0.1%
others	0.3%

== Religion ==
In 1755 a wooden church of St. Simeon the Stylite was built in the village. After repeated reconstructions, in 1908–1909 it was rebuilt into stone church. In 2005–2011 the church was under reconstruction, in the summer of 2011 service was resumed.

On May 5, 2002, the first service was held in the newly built church.

== Elections ==
=== Ukrainian elections ===
The village belongs to a single-member constituency No. 95.

== Gallery ==
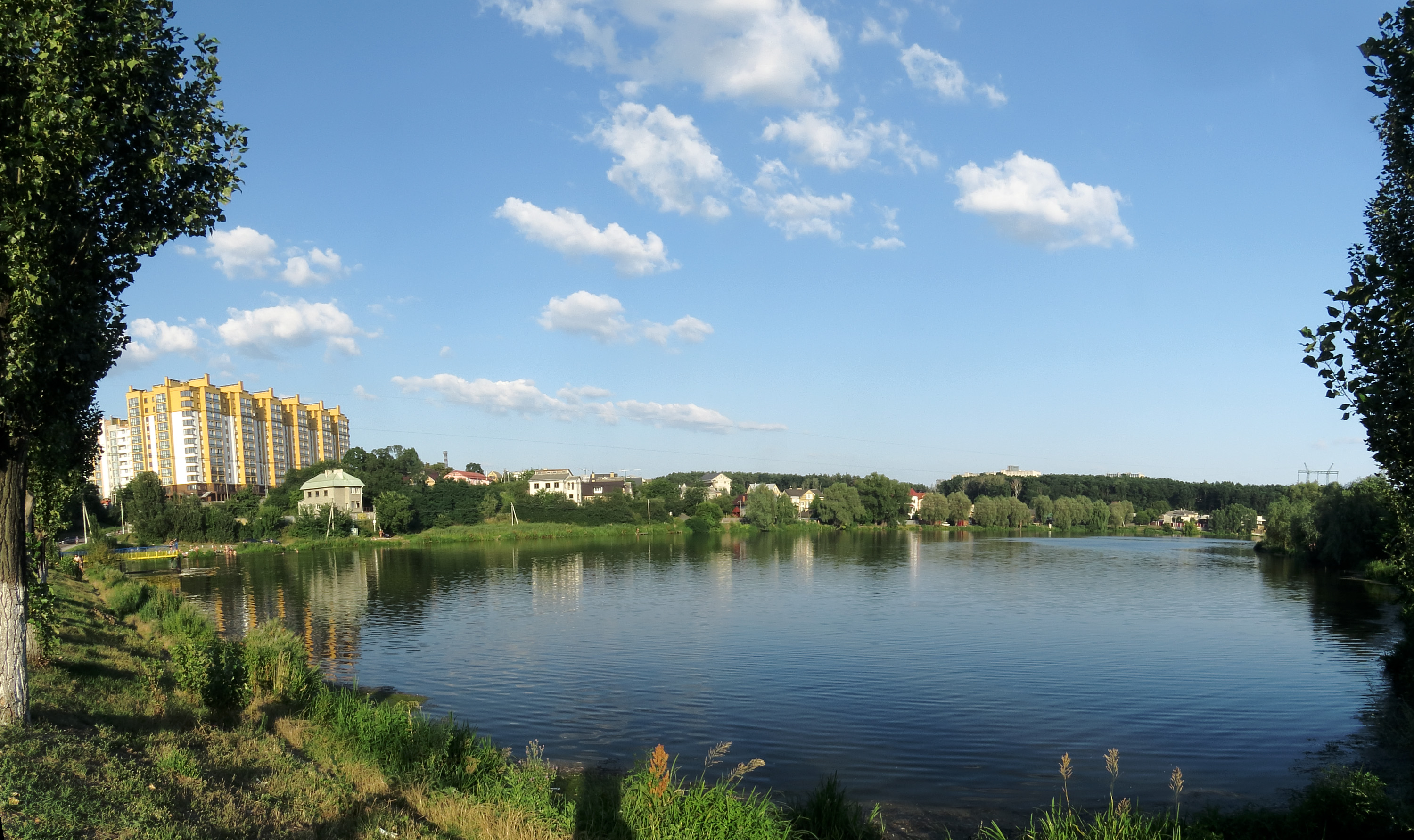
A pond

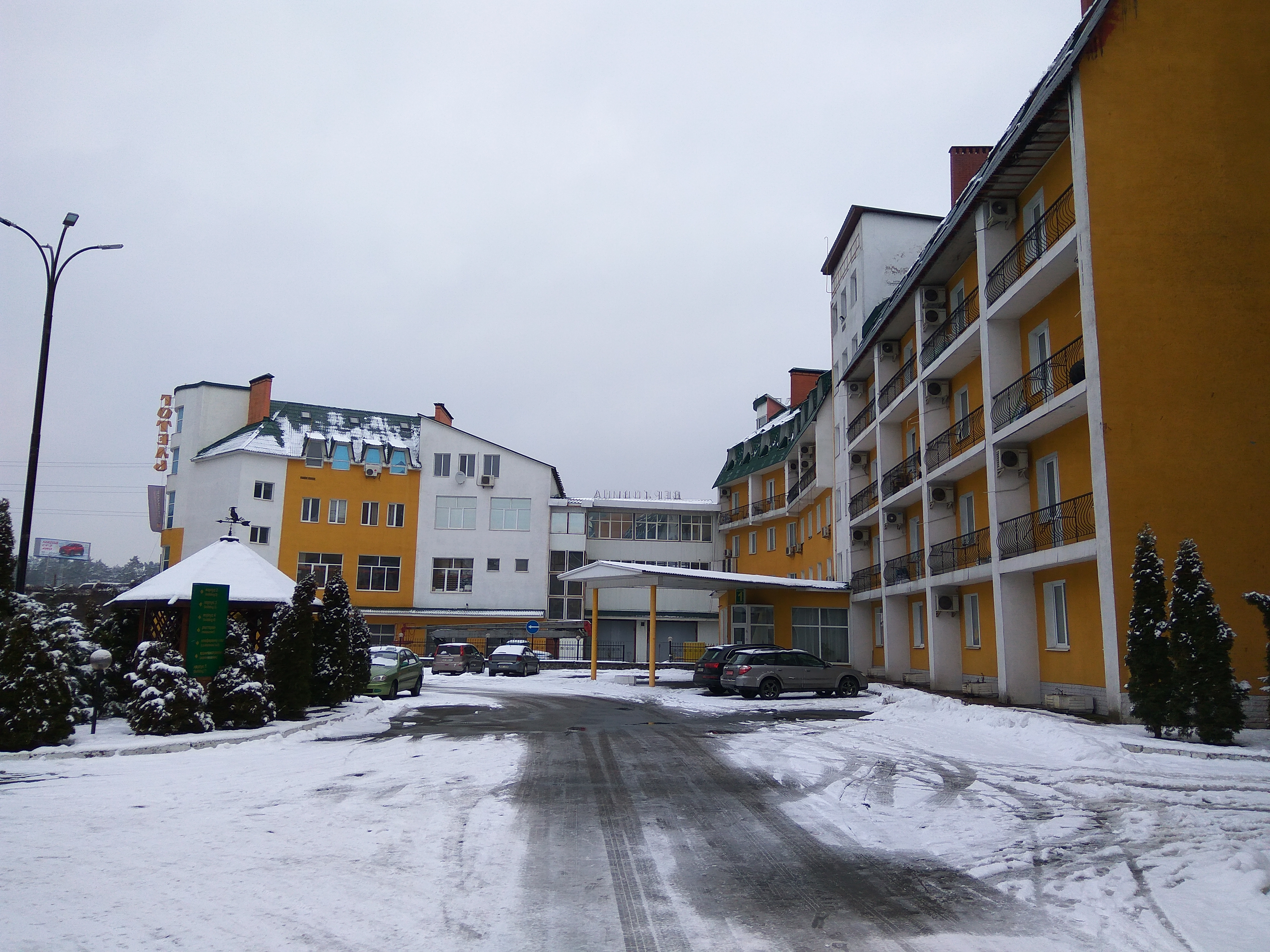
Verhovyna hotel near Kiltseva Road

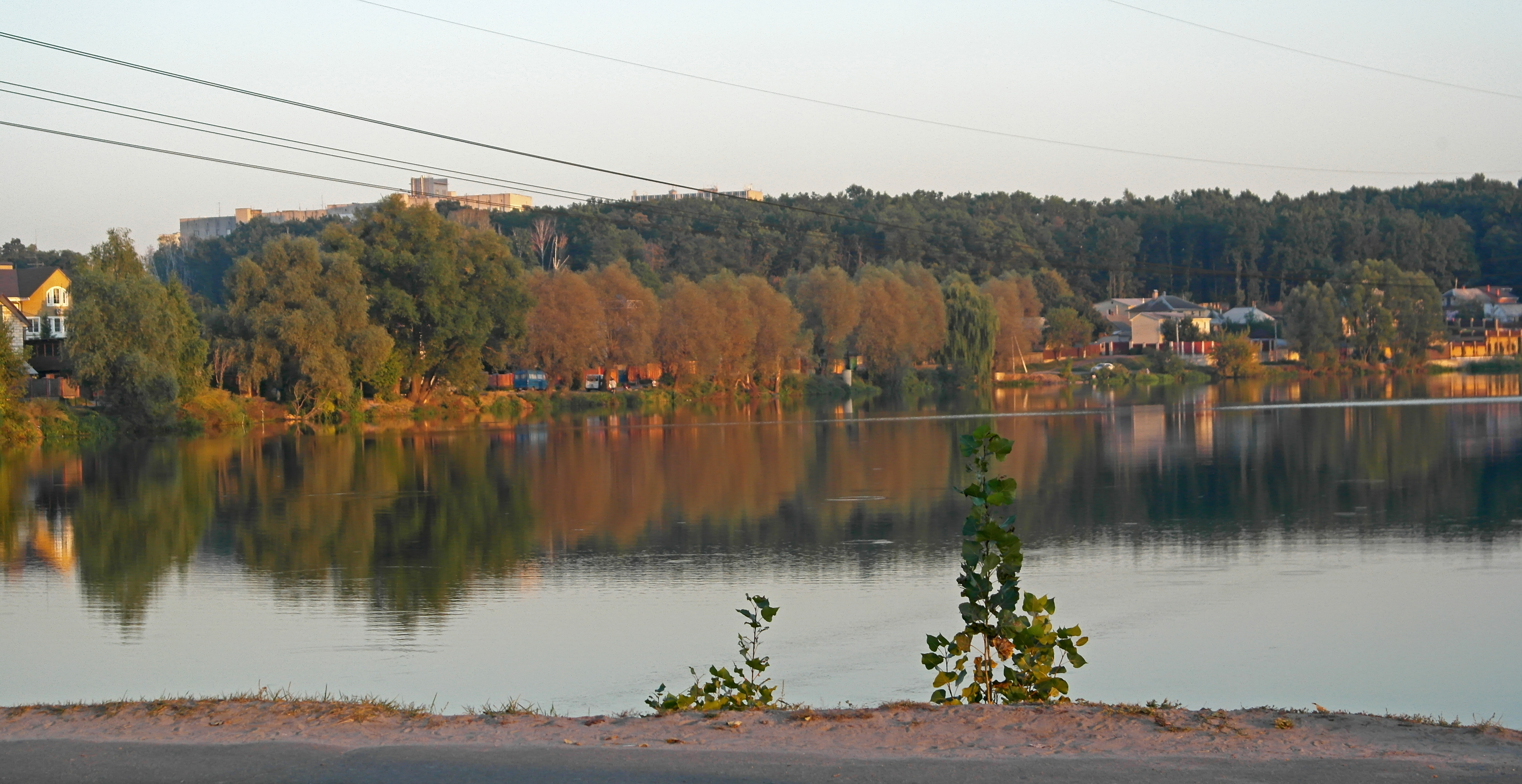
Pond on the river Nyvka

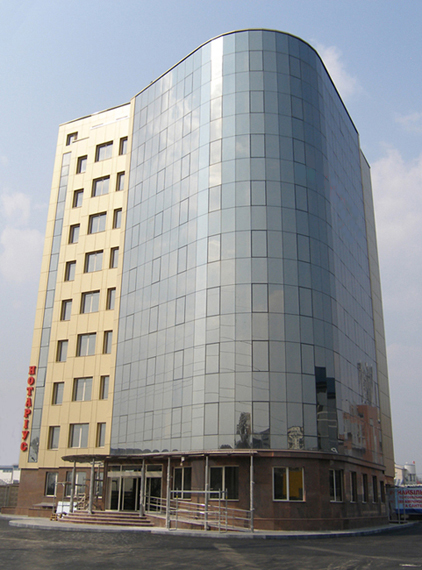
Golden Center building

== See also ==
- Sofiivska Borshchahivka, a neighboring village
- Borshchahivka, the Kyiv city neighborhood
