= Kriukivshchyna =

Village in Kyiv Oblast, Ukraine

Kriukivshchyna Крюківщина
- Village
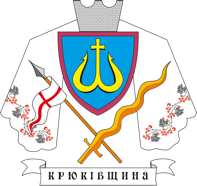
- Coat of arms

- Location within Kyiv Oblast Location within Ukraine
- Coordinates: 50°22′6″N 30°22′5″E
- Country: Ukraine
- Oblast: Kyiv Oblast
- District: Bucha Raion
- Founded: 1701 A.D.
- Rural Council: Kriukivshchyna Rural Council

Government
  - Village Chairman: Andrii Kripak (Party of Regions)
- Area: 4.42 km^{2} (1.71 sq mi)
- Elevation: 175 m (574 ft)
- Population (2001): 3,509
  - Density: 793.89/km^{2} (2,056.2/sq mi)
- Time zone: UTC+2 (EET)
  - Summer (DST): UTC+3 (EEST)
- Postal code: 08136
- Area code: +380 4598
- Website: krukivschina.com.ua

Kriukivshchyna (Ukrainian: Крюківщина) is a village in Bucha Raion, Kyiv Oblast, in northern Ukraine. It belongs to Vyshneve urban hromada, one of the hromadas of Ukraine.

== Name ==
Predating the modern village, at the end of 16th century this territory belonged to a settlement called Yurevychi. Later it became known as Kryvkovshchyna, which is derived from anthroponym Kryvko-Kryvkovych, the family of local landowners circa 16th century. Eventually the name had changed to Kriukivshchyna due to loss of historical connections (apparently in the same way as several neighboring villages, e.g. Zheliany changed to Zhuliany).

== History ==
Lavrentii Pokhylevych writes in his "Story of Kiev Governorate's Settlements" (1864):

- "Kriukivshchyna is a village in 2 versts from the village of Hatne near an unnamed stream, which dries up in summer on an elevated plain with rare, for these places, shrub copses. 642 dwellers as well as 12 Jews live here together with Shakhravshchyna. Shakhravshchyna is a separate part of the village by the river Veta. It is populated by the descendants of a Moldovan named Davyd who married a Ukrainian woman in Monastyrysche. That's why all the contemporary dwellers of Shakhravshchyna are called Davydenko. In addition to this local folks tell that on a hill between Shakhravshchyna and Kriukivshchyna, where traces of some kind of settlement can be seen, a knyaz Shakhrai once lived, who owned all the neighboring villages. There's a tract near Shakhravshchyna called Tur's valley. A story says that some 200 years ago Kriukivshchyna and Shakhravshchyna were surrounded by dense forests. Kriukivshchyna, Shakhravshchyna and Yurivka belonged to St. Michael's Golden-Domed Monastery before all estates were taken from the monasteries…"
- "Exaltation of the Cross wooden church, 5th class; has 51 tithes of land; built on the place of the previous one in 1792. Has been fixed: in 1808 by the parish and in 1852 on expense of the treasury. Yurivka is included in the parish."

In the village and around there are pillboxes of Kiev Fortified Region. Pillbox № 301 and the communication node of the Kiev Special Military District are historical monuments. In the village there is a landscape zakaznik "Ozerne".

Until 18 July 2020, Kriukivshchyna was located in Kyiv-Sviatoshyn Raion. The raion was abolished that day as part of the administrative reform of Ukraine, which reduced the number of raions of Kyiv Oblast to seven. The area of Kyiv-Sviatoshyn Raion was split between Bucha, Fastiv, and Obukhiv Raions, with Kriukivshchyna being transferred to Bucha Raion.

== Gallery ==
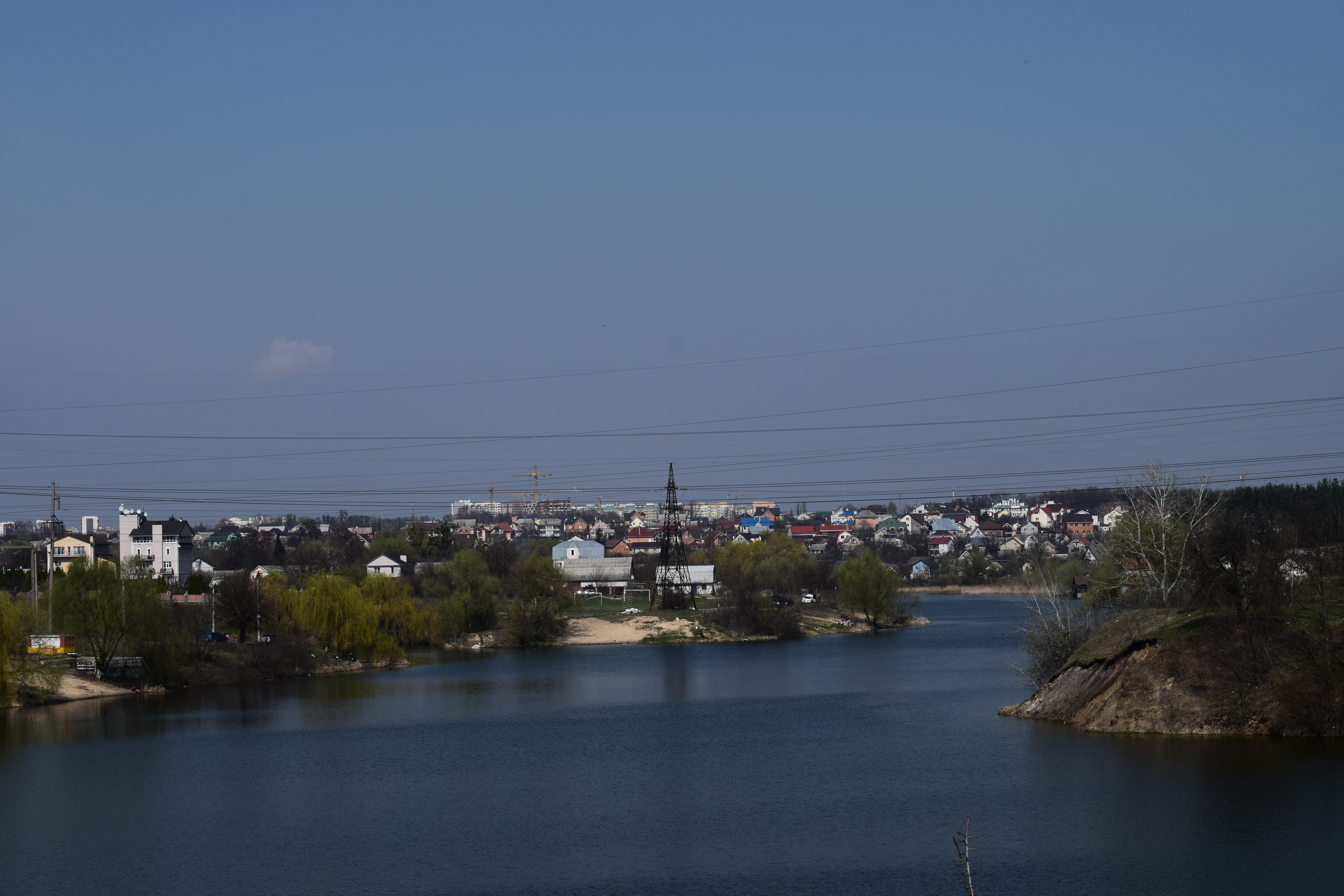
Kriukivshchyna, view from the river.

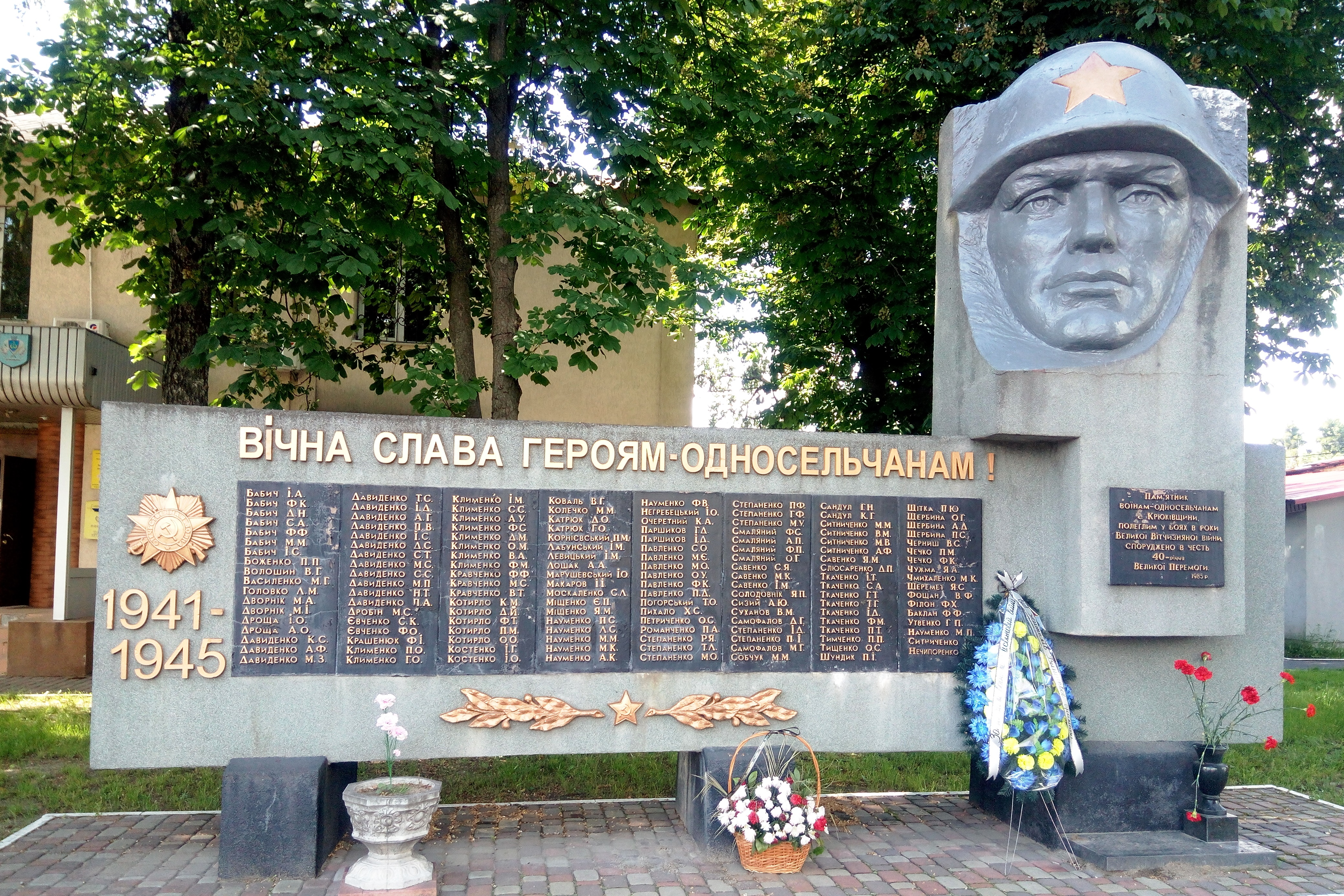
Memorial to soldiers who died in the battles of World War II

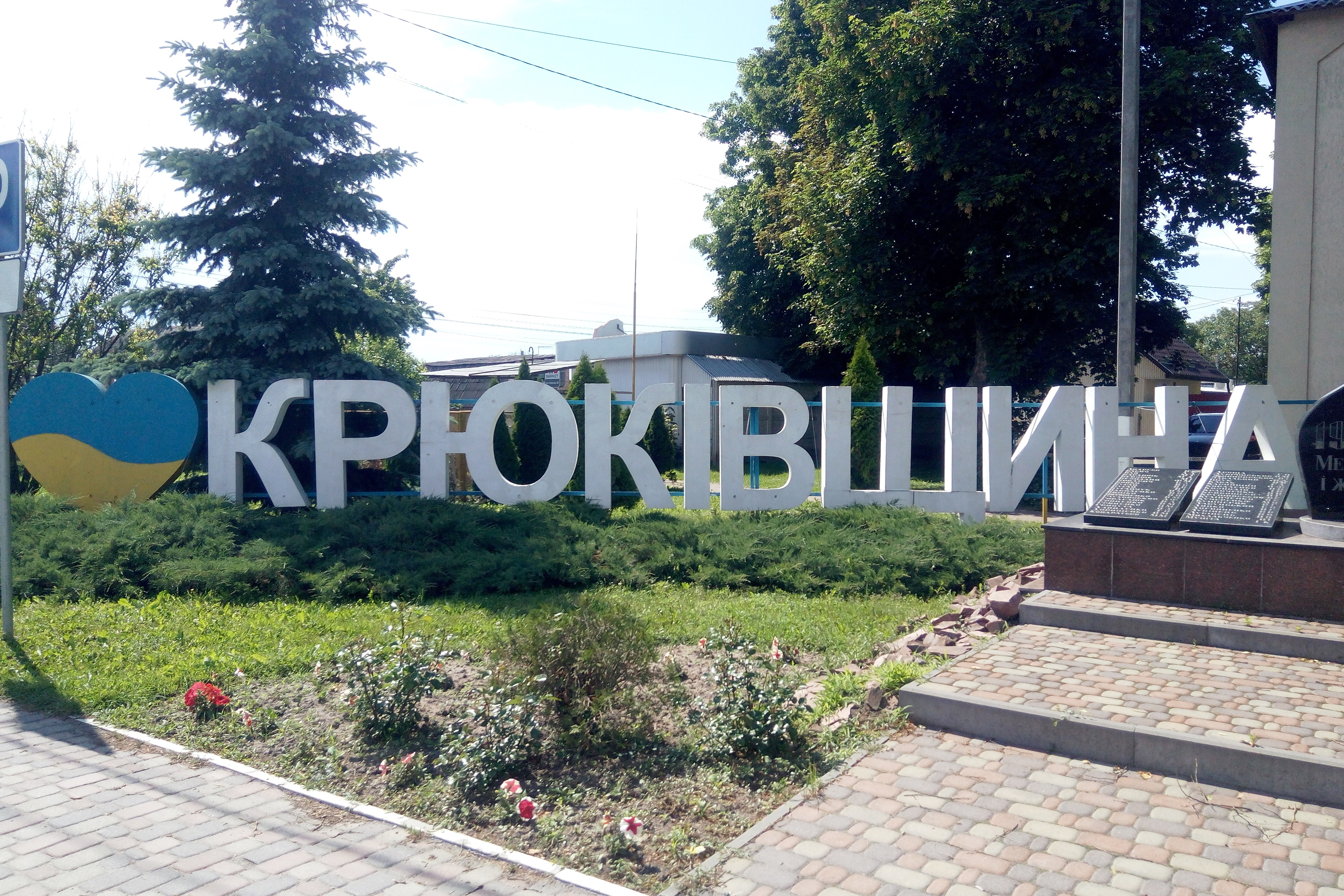
Art object "I love Kriukivshchyna"

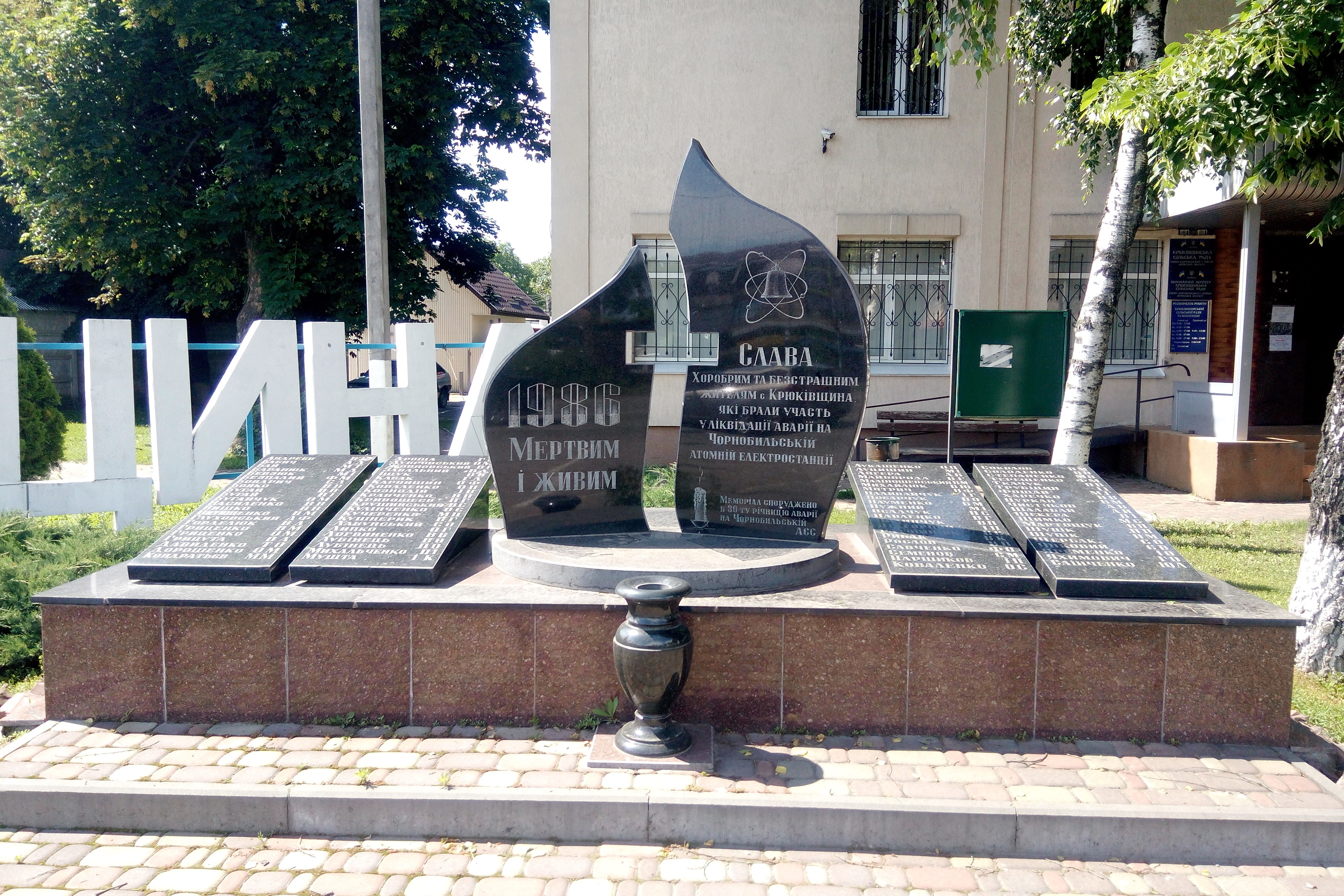
Monument to the Chernobyl victims

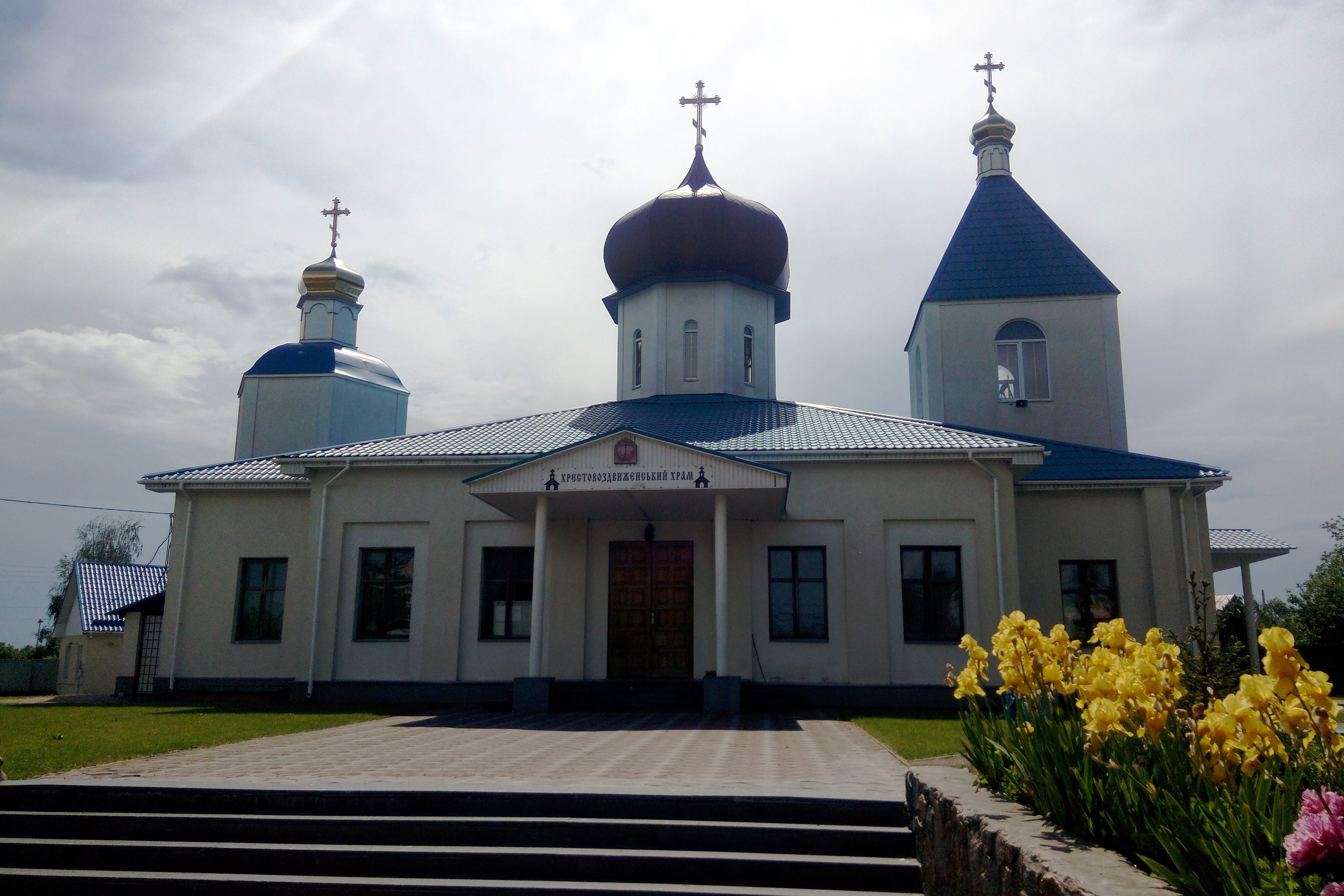
Church of the Exaltation of the Life-Giving Cross (UOC-MP)

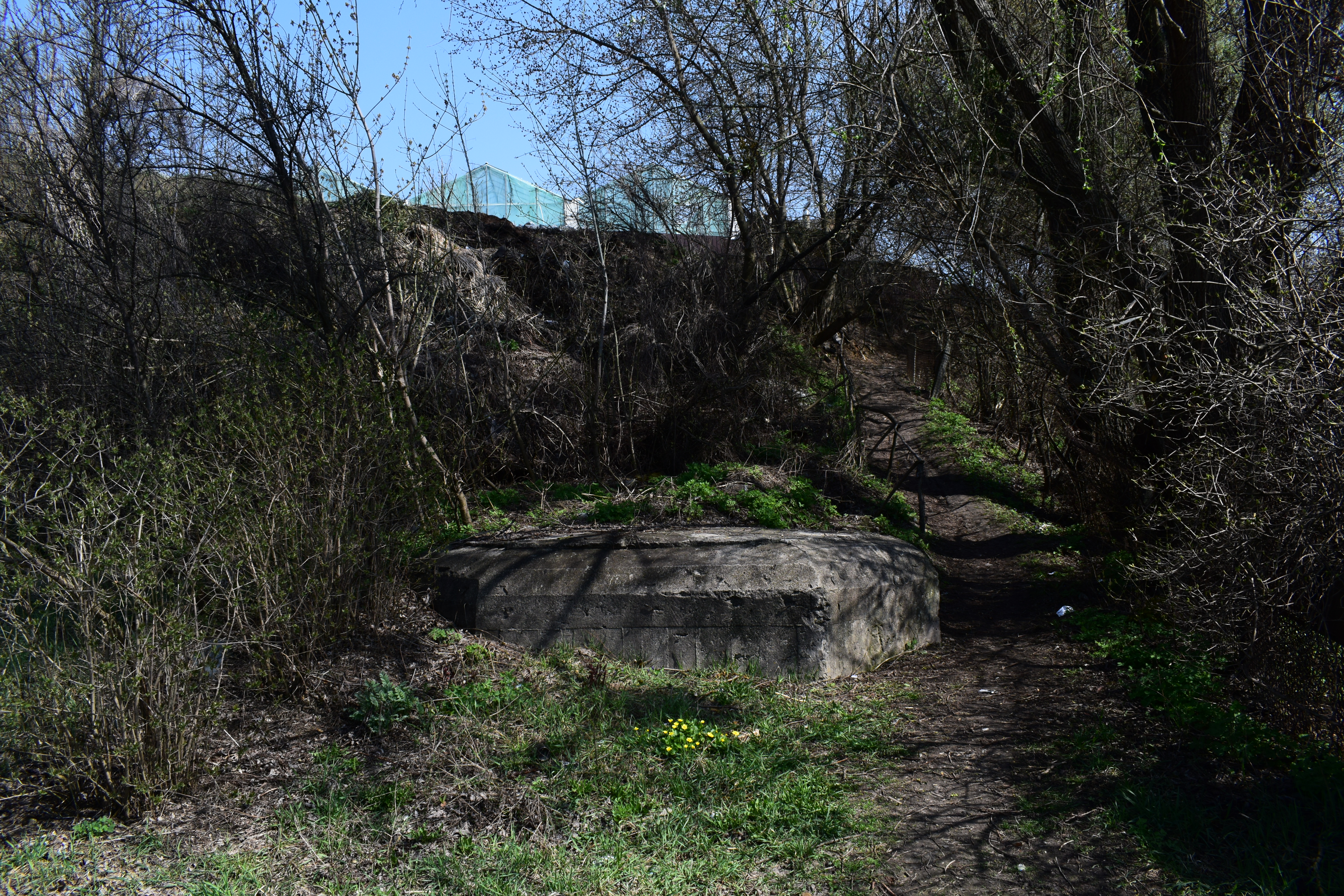
Pillbox № 301

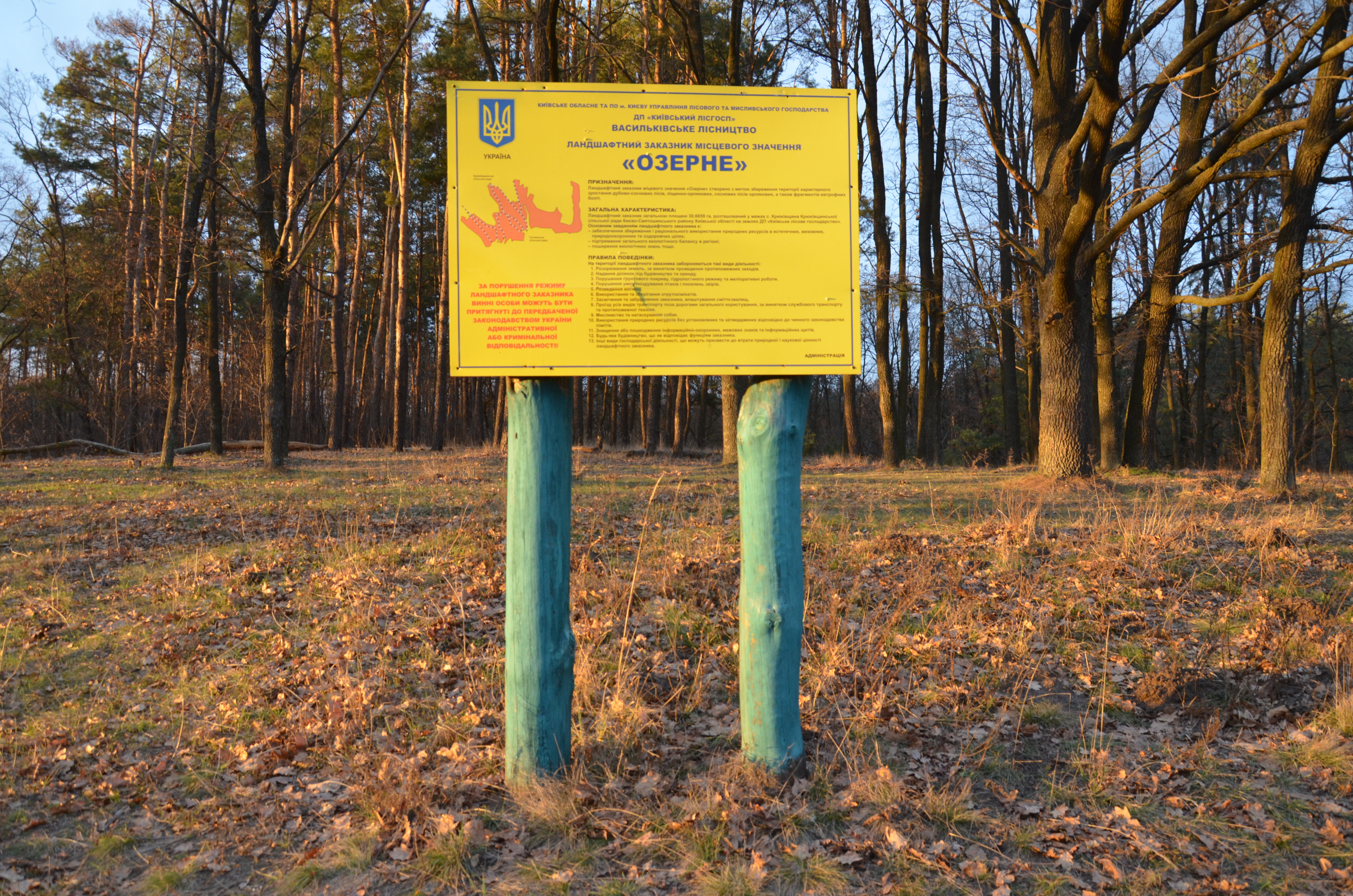
Zakaznik "Ozerne"
