= Borshchahivka rural hromada =

Borshchahivka rural hromada Борщагівська селищна громада
- Hromada
- Interactive map of Borshchahivka rural hromada
- Country: Ukraine
- Oblast: Kyiv Oblast
- Raion: Bucha Raion

Area
  - Total: 38.7 km^{2} (14.9 sq mi)

Population (2020)
  - Total: 21,894
  - Density: 566/km^{2} (1,470/sq mi)
- Settlements: 3
- Villages: 3

Borshchahivka rural hromada (Ukrainian: Борщагівська селищна громада) is a hromada of Ukraine, located in Bucha Raion, Kyiv Oblast. Its administrative center is the village of Sofiivska Borshchahivka.

It has an area of 38.7 square kilometres (14.9 mi^{2}) and a population of 21,894, as of 2020.

The hromada contains 3 settlements, which are all villages:

- Chaiky
- Petropavlivska Borshchahivka
- Sofiivska Borshchahivka

== See also ==
- List of hromadas of Ukraine
