= Chabany settlement hromada =

Chabany settlement hromada Чабанівська селищна громада
- Hromada
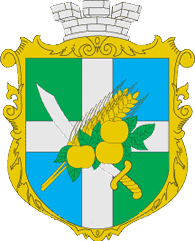
- Seal
- Interactive map of Chabany settlement hromada
- Country: Ukraine
- Oblast: Kyiv Oblast
- Raion: Fastiv Raion

Area
  - Total: 12.8 km^{2} (4.9 sq mi)

Population (2020)
  - Total: 11,404
  - Density: 891/km^{2} (2,310/sq mi)
- Settlements: 2
- Rural settlements: 1
- Towns: 1

Chabany settlement hromada (Ukrainian: Чабанівська селищна громада) is a hromada of Ukraine, located in Fastiv Raion, Kyiv Oblast. Its administrative center is the town of Chabany.

It has an area of 12.8 square kilometres (4.9 mi^{2}) and a population of 11,404, as of 2020.

The hromada includes 2 settlements: 1 rural settlement (Chabany) and 1 village (Novosilky).

== See also ==
- List of hromadas of Ukraine
