= Vyshneve urban hromada =

Vyshneve urban hromada Вишнева міська громада
- Hromada
- Interactive map of Vyshneve urban hromada
- Country: Ukraine
- Oblast: Kyiv
- Raion: Bucha

Area
  - Total: 17.6 km^{2} (6.8 sq mi)

Population (2020)
  - Total: 48,357
  - Density: 2,750/km^{2} (7,120/sq mi)
- Settlements: 2
- Cities: 1
- Villages: 1

Vyshneve urban hromada (Ukrainian: Вишнева міська громада) is a hromada of Ukraine, located in Bucha Raion, Kyiv Oblast. Its administrative center is the city Vyshneve.

It has an area of 17.6 square kilometres (6.8 mi^{2}) and a population of 48,357, as of 2020.

The hromada contains 2 settlements: 1 city (Vyshneve), and 1 village (Kriukivshchyna).

== See also ==
- List of hromadas of Ukraine
