= Hatne rural hromada =

Hatne rural hromada Гатненська селищна громада
- Hromada
- Interactive map of Hatne rural hromada
- Country: Ukraine
- Oblast: Kyiv Oblast
- Raion: Fastiv Raion

Area
  - Total: 36.6 km^{2} (14.1 sq mi)

Population (2020)
  - Total: 9,417
  - Density: 257/km^{2} (666/sq mi)
- Settlements: 3
- Villages: 3

Hatne rural hromada (Ukrainian: Гатненська селищна громада) is a hromada of Ukraine, located in Fastiv Raion, Kyiv Oblast. Its administrative center is the village of Hatne.

It has an area of 36.6 square kilometres (14.1 mi^{2}) and a population of 9,417, as of 2020.

The hromada contains 3 settlements, which are all villages:

- Vita-Poshtova
- Hatne
- Yurivka

== See also ==
- List of hromadas of Ukraine
