= Hatne, Ukraine =

Rural locality in Kyiv Oblast, Ukraine

Hatne Гатне
- Village
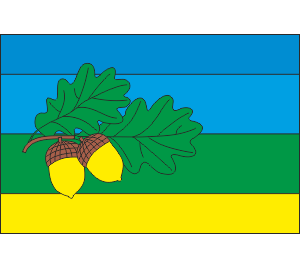
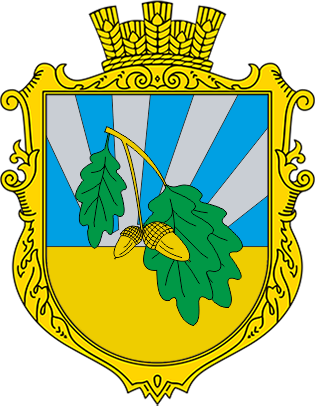
- Flag Coat of arms
- Interactive map of Hatne
- Coordinates: 50°21′30″N 30°23′56″E
- Country: Ukraine
- Oblast: Kyiv Oblast
- Raion: Fastiv Raion
- Hromada: Hatne rural hromada
- Founded: 1169 A.D.
- Rural Council: Hatne Rural Council

Government
  - Village Chairman: Bronislav Korytski
- Area: 2.877 km^{2} (1.111 sq mi)
- Elevation: 152 m (499 ft)
- Population (2001): 3,077
  - Density: 1,072/km^{2} (2,780/sq mi)
- Time zone: UTC+2 (EET)
  - Summer (DST): UTC+3 (EEST)
- Postal code: 08160
- Area code: +380 4598
- Website: gatne-rada.gov.ua//

Hatne (Ukrainian: Гатне) is a selo in Fastiv Raion in Kyiv Oblast of northern Ukraine. It hosts the administration of Hatne rural hromada, one of the hromadas of Ukraine.

== History ==
The village was established in 1169.

Until 18 July 2020, Hatne belonged to Kyiv-Sviatoshyn Raion. The raion was abolished that day as part of the administrative reform of Ukraine, which reduced the number of raions of Kyiv Oblast to seven. The area of Kyiv-Sviatoshyn Raion was split between Bucha, Fastiv, and Obukhiv Raions, with Hatne being transferred to Fastiv Raion.

== Geography ==
The village lies at an altitude of 152 metres (499 ft) and covers an area of 2,877 km^{2} (1,111 sq mi). It has a population of about 3077 people.
