= Vyshneve, Kyiv Oblast =

City in Kyiv Oblast, Ukraine

Vyshneve Вишневе
- City
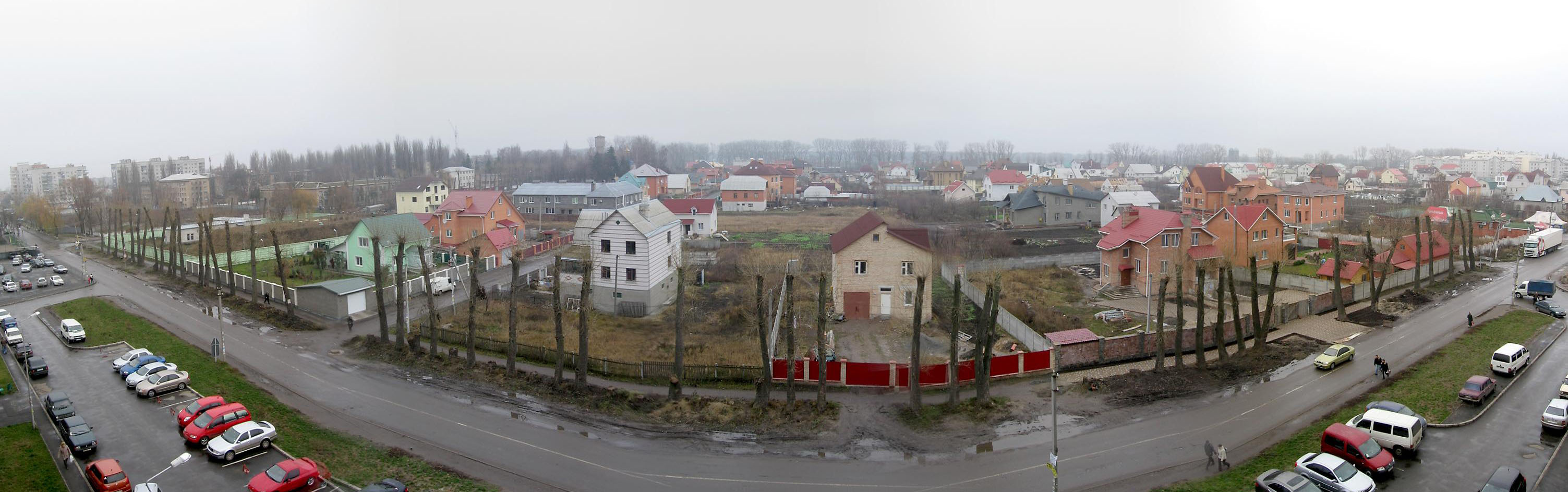
- Panorama of Vyshneve

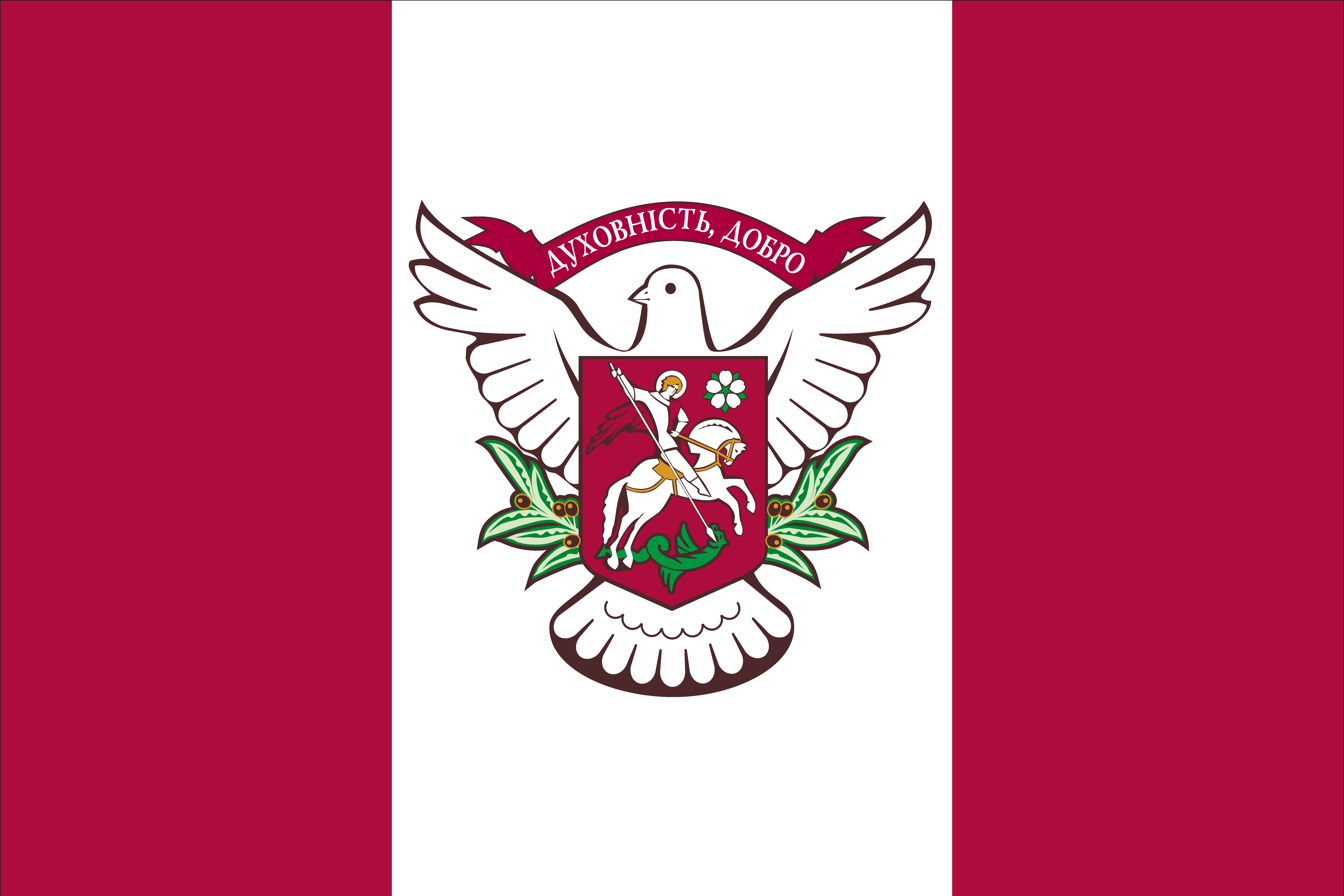
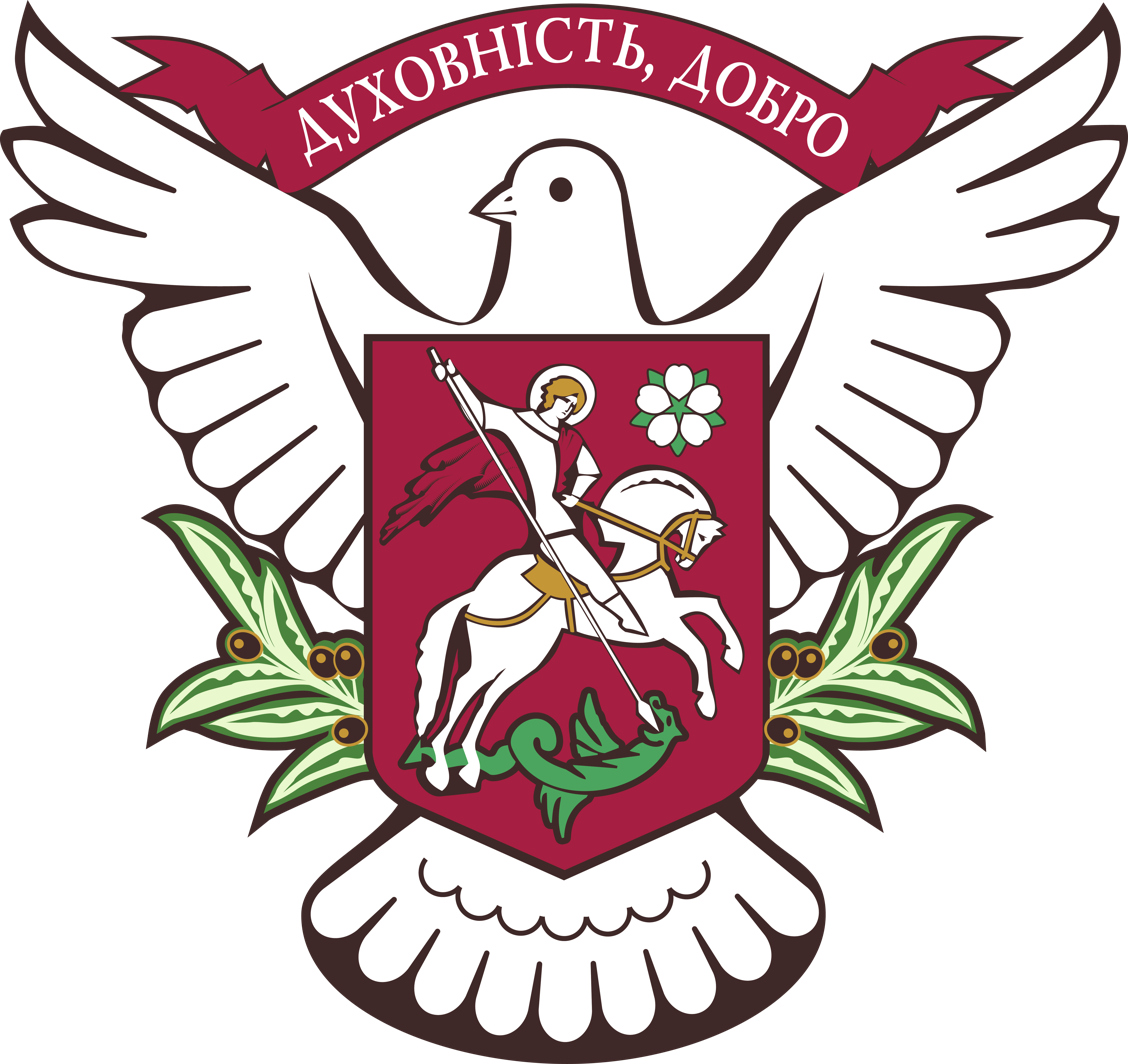
- Flag Coat of arms
- Interactive map of Vyshneve
- Location within Kyiv Oblast Location within Ukraine
- Coordinates: 50°23′13″N 30°21′29″E
- Country: Ukraine
- Oblast: Kyiv Oblast
- Raion: Bucha Raion
- Hromada: Vyshneve urban hromada
- Founded: 1887

Area
  - Total: 25.2 km^{2} (9.7 sq mi)

Population (2022)
  - Total: 42,983
  - Density: 1,710/km^{2} (4,420/sq mi)
- Time zone: UTC+2 (EET)
  - Summer (DST): UTC+3 (EEST)
- Postal code: 08132
- Area code: +380 4598
- ISO 3166 code: UA-32
- Website: vyshneve-rada.gov.ua

Vyshneve (Ukrainian: Вишневе, IPA: [wɪʃˈnɛwe]) is a city in Bucha Raion, Kyiv Oblast, Ukraine, located two kilometres (1.2 mi) south of the capital Kyiv. Vyshneve hosts the administration of Vyshneve urban hromada, one of the hromadas of Ukraine. It has a population of 42,983 (2022 estimate).

== History ==
In 1886, a railway station was built on this site; at the time, the nearest settlement was the village of Zhuliany (Жуляни), so the railway station was given the name "Zhuliany" after the village. In 1912, people started settling around the station.

During the Russian Civil War (1917–1921) the Red and White armies fought here. The population increased during the times of Joseph Stalin's forced collectivization policies (1928–1940), when peasants were settled near the station.

During World War II, Vyshneve became a battlefield. Soviet and German troops fought there until 8 August 1941. After the war, 365 inhabitants received awards for glory and heroism.

Between 1946–1956 the modern town of Vyshneve was built. A school was opened, a town council was formed and new streets were constructed. By 1960 the population had reached 4000. In 1971 the settlement of Vyshneve was officially proclaimed by the Ukrainian Higher Council (parliament) as a town.

Vyshneve's population was 34,465 at the time of the 2001 Ukrainian census. The town has four schools, five kindergartens, a cinema, a clinic, two churches, a hospital and other elements of a modern town.

The chairman of the city is Illya Dikov.

Until 18 July 2020, Vyshneve belonged to Kyiv-Sviatoshyn Raion. The raion was abolished that day as part of the administrative reform of Ukraine, which reduced the number of raions of Kyiv Oblast to seven. The area of Kyiv-Sviatoshyn Raion was split between Bucha, Fastiv, and Obukhiv Raions, with Vyshneve being transferred to Bucha Raion.

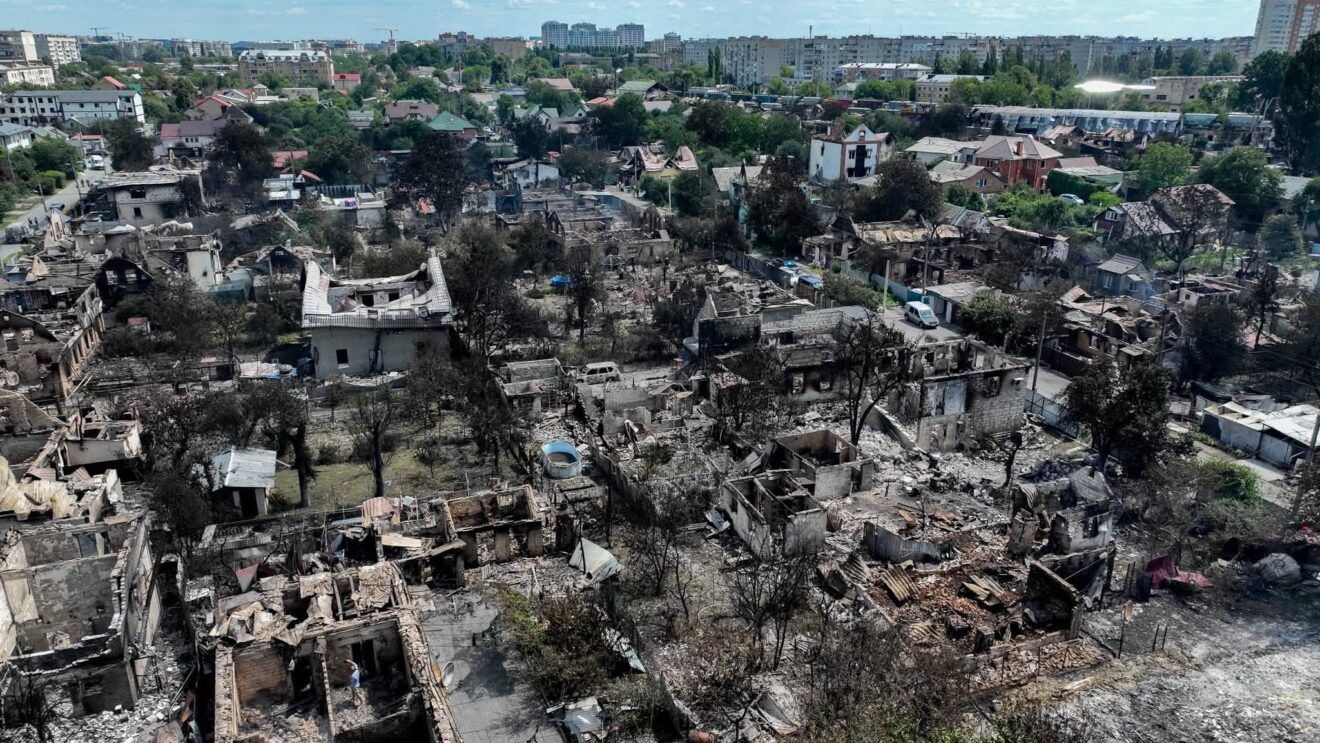
Consequences of the strike on 6 July 2026

On the night of 6 July 2026, a Russian attack in Vyshneve damaged almost 300 houses as a result of a secondary detonation of an ammunition depot located near the residential area. 91 of the houses were destroyed, while nine people died and dozens were injured.

== Demographics ==
As of the 2001 Ukrainian census, the city had a population of 34,295 inhabitants. In terms of ethnic groups living in the city, Ukrainians account for roughly 90% of the population, while a notable Russian minority also lives in Vyshneve. In terms of spoken languages, almost 88% of the population speak Ukrainian as their first language, while 11% speak Russian natively. The respective ethnic and linguistic compositions of the city were as follows:

Ethnic groups in Vyshneve
	percent
Ukrainians	89.50%
Russians	8.56%
Belarusians	0.76%
Poles	0.25%
Armenians	0.18%
Jews	0.12%
others	0.75%

Native languages in Vyshneve
	percent
Ukrainian	87.7%
Russian	11.8%
Belarusian	0.2%
Armenian	0.1%
others	0.1%

== Gallery ==
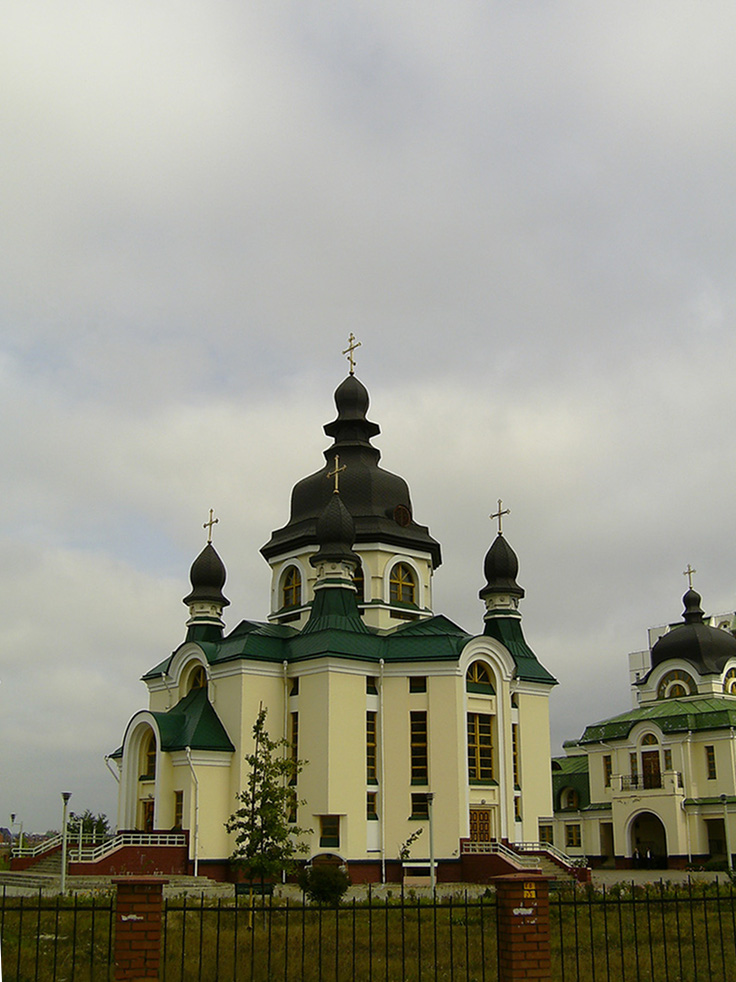
Ascension Church

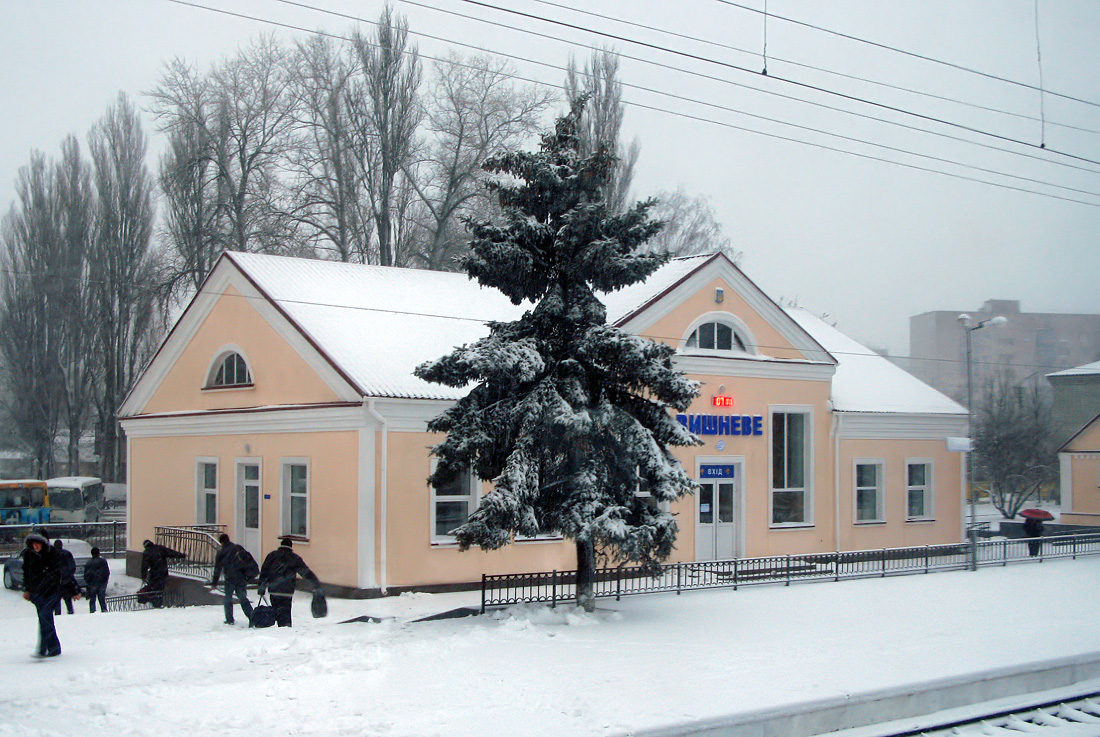
Railway station

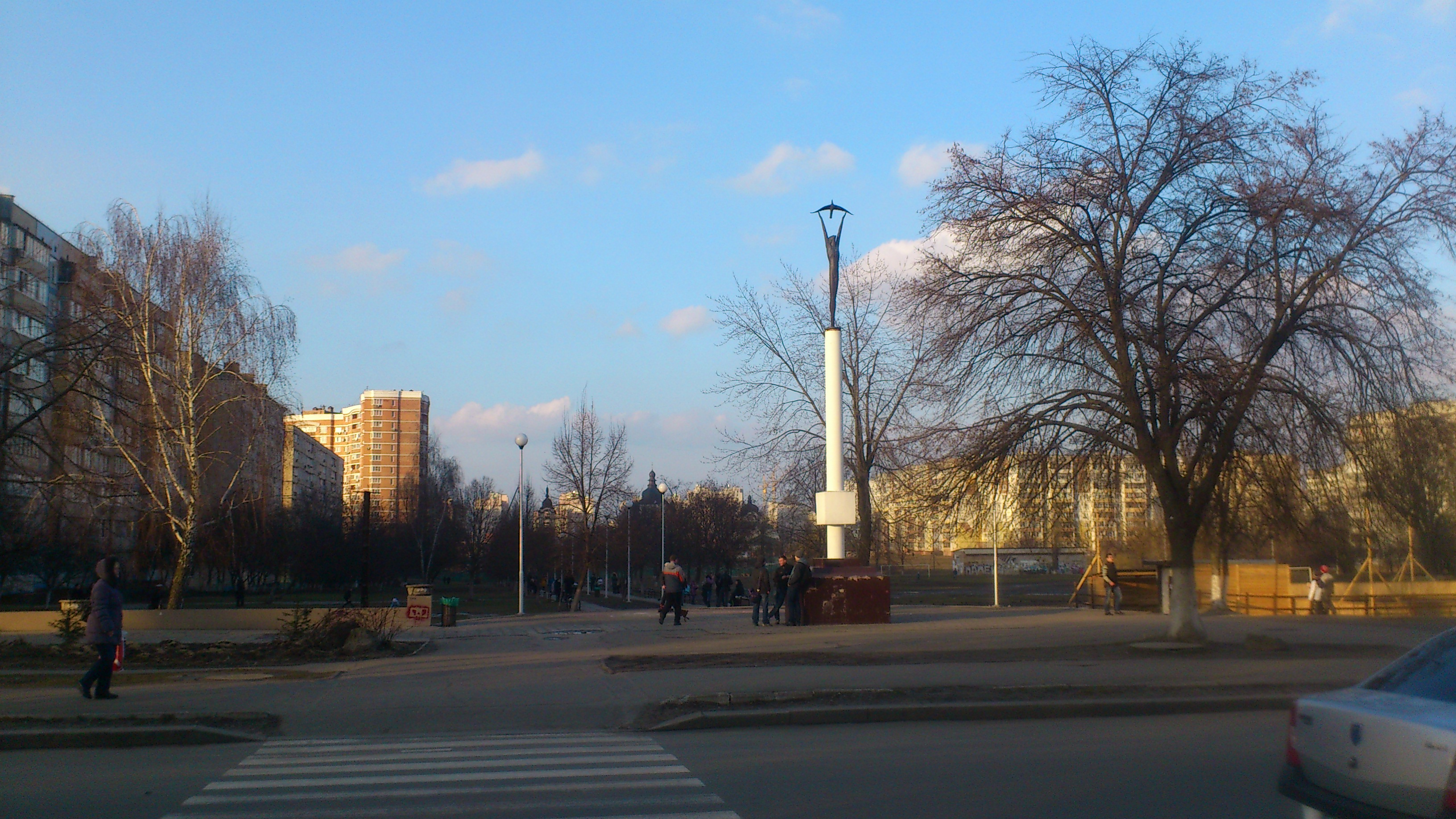
Monument
