= Oleksandr Sukhenko =

Ukrainian footballer (1996–2022)

Oleksandr "Sasha" Ihorovych Sukhenko
Personal information
- Full name: Олександра Сухенка
- Date of birth: 25 September 1996
- Place of birth: Motyzhyn, Ukraine
- Date of death: 23 March 2022 (aged 25)
- Place of death: Motyzhyn, Ukraine
- Positions: Right winger; forward

Senior career*
Years	Team	Apps	(Gls)
2018–2019	Chayka Petropavlivska Borshchahivka	21	(3)
- * Club domestic league appearances and goals

Oleksandr Ihorovych Sukhenko (Ukrainian: Олександра Сухенка 25 September 1996 – 24 March 2022) was a Ukrainian footballer who played as a right winger and forward for several clubs in the Kyiv Oblast. He was killed alongside his parents during the 2022 Russian invasion of Ukraine.

== Biography ==
Oleksandr Sukhenko was born in the village of Motyzhyn in the Makariv Raion of Kyiv Oblast. His mother Olha Sukhenko was a local politician and his father Igor Vasyliovych was a member of the village council and president of the local football club, "Kolos". Sukhenko started his football career at this club, winning championships and cups in the Makariv Region.

=== Ukraine Second Division ===
From 2018 to 2019, he played for Chayka in Petropavlivska Borshchahivka, competing in the Ukrainian Second League. Over two seasons, he played 21 matches and scored 4 goals. He also contributed to the team's efforts in the Ukrainian Cup.

Later, he played for the amateur football club FC Kudrivka, with which he won the Kyiv-Sviatoshyn Raion championship and Kyiv Oblast championship, and for "Sokil" from Mykhailivka-Rubezhivka, where he was part of the team that won the Kyiv Oblast Cup.

=== Russian advance on Kyiv ===
In late February 2022, Russian forces began advancing towards Kyiv's western suburbs in the Kyiv Oblast. Sukhenko's hometown of Motyzhyn was located directly in the centre of the Northern front of the Russian invasion of Ukraine, which would see heavy fighting.

At the onset of the fighting, Sukhenko chose to stay in Motyzhyn with his parents, to support his mother as village mayor and deliver medical supplies. He encouraged his sister to leave for safety with her husband and child.

On 23 March 2022, during the Russian occupation of Motyzhyn, Sukhenko disappeared along with his father and mother. The bodies of the Sukhenko family were found in a mass grave on 2 April 2022 after the liberation of Motyzhyn. They had reportedly been tortured before their death.

== Honours ==
- Kyiv Oblast Football Championship (1): 2020
- Kyiv Oblast Football Cup (1): 2020

== Career statistics ==
Season	Team	League	Appearances	Goals	Cup	Appearances	Goals	Goals	Appearances	Goals	Total	Appearances	Goals
2017–2018	Chayka Petropavlivska Borshchahivka				Ukrainian Cup	1	0				1	0	
2018–2019	Chayka Petropavlivska Borshchahivka	Ukrainian Second League	14	2	Ukrainian Cup	1	0				15	2	
2019–2020	Chayka Petropavlivska Borshchahivka	Ukrainian Second League	7	1	Ukrainian Cup	2	1				9	2	
Total at Chayka			21	3		4	1		0	0	25	4	
Total career			21	3		4	1		0	0	25	4	

== See also ==
- Bucha massacre
- Battle of Bucha
- Battle of Makariv
- List of Ukrainian sports figures killed during the Russo-Ukrainian war
