= Byshiv =

Byshiv (Ukrainian: Бишів) may refer to several places in Ukraine:

- Byshiv, Ivano-Frankivsk Oblast, village in Ivano-Frankivsk Raion, Ivano-Frankivsk Oblast
- Byshiv, Kyiv Oblast, village in Fastiv Raion, Kyiv Oblast, the administrative center of Byshiv rural hromada
  - Byshiv rural hromada, hromada in Fastiv Raion, Kyiv Oblast
- Byshiv, Lviv Oblast, village in Chervonohrad Raion, Lviv Oblast
