= Battle of Makariv =

Battle during the Russian invasion of Ukraine

- Part of the northern front of the Russian invasion of Ukraine
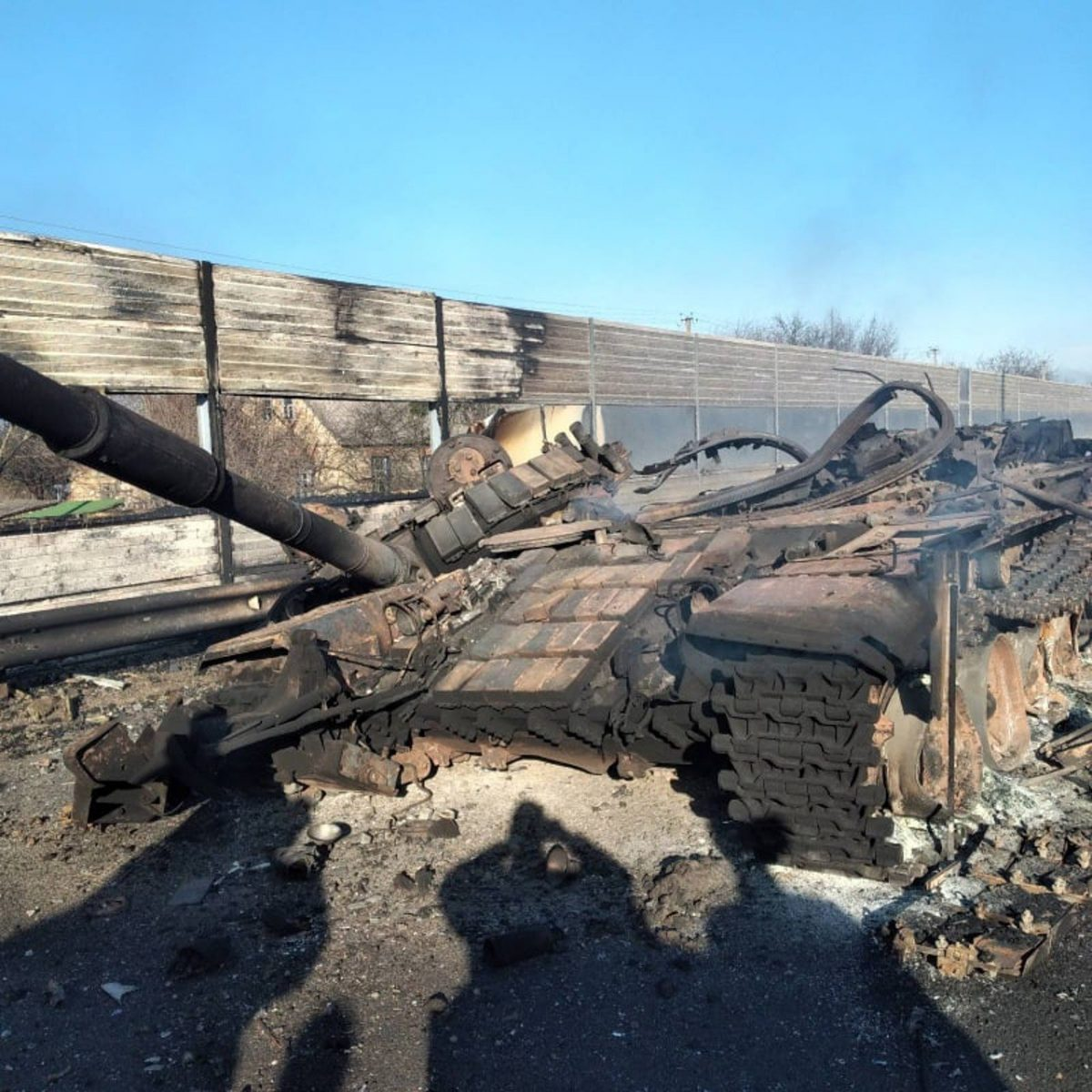
- A destroyed Russian T-72 tank in Makariv
Date	27 February – 25 March 2022 (3 weeks and 5 days)
Location	Makariv, Ukraine
Result	Ukrainian victory

Belligerents
Russia	Ukraine

Commanders and leaders
Yuri Medvedev (WIA)	

Units involved
37th Separate Guards Motor Rifle Brigade	14th Separate Mechanized Brigade; 95th Air Assault Brigade; Territorial Defense Forces; Safari Regiment

Casualties and losses
Heavy; close to half of the 37th Brigade is killed	Unknown
- 200+ civilians killed

The battle of Makariv was a military engagement in the town of Makariv in Kyiv Oblast, Ukraine, during the Russian invasion of Ukraine. The battle lasted from 27 February 2022 to 25 March 2022, the last day that fighting was reported in Makariv. Shelling of the town continued until 31 March, and the Makariv settlement hromada was fully liberated the next day, on 1 April.

Following the liberation of the area, it was discovered that over 200 civilians had been murdered by the Russian occupying forces in the territory of the Makariv settlement hromada. This often included cases of torture, killing the elderly, and shooting people in the head with their hands tied behind their backs.

== Battle ==
On 27 February 2022, Ukrainian civilians informed the Ukrainian Armed Forces that a Russian column of 15 tanks, 25 armoured personnel carriers and 15 Ural-4320 vehicles passed through Makariv. They were organized in three convoys and also carried flamethrowers, missiles, self-propelled artillery and fuel. Ukrainian journalist Andriy Tsaplienko wrote that they were in the direction of Kyiv or Zhytomyr. Fighting started later that day on Makariv. Russian forces attempted to reach Kyiv through the town. According to Ukrinform, Russian forces placed women and children on personnel carriers as human shields. At least one Russian tank was destroyed. Part of the Russian column entered the highway connecting Kyiv and Zhytomyr. On the morning of 28 February, a Russian convoy carrying military equipment near Makariv was destroyed by Ukrainian forces. On 2 March, the Ukrainian forces claimed that they had fully taken back Makariv. This was done by the 14th Separate Mechanized Brigade and the 95th Air Assault Brigade, which entrenched themselves in Makariv after its liberation.

On 8 March, after heavy fighting in the area around Makariv, a Ukrainian commander supposed that there was still a Russian column nearby that needed to be destroyed. It was spotted by Ukrainian explorers who communicated that they were moving towards the position of a Ukrainian T-64BV tank crewed by senior sergeant Serhii Vasich and his subordinates, senior soldier Vitaliy Parkhomuk and soldier Oleh Svynchuk, all of the 14th Separate Mechanized Brigade. Once the Russian forces were within the range of the tank, Vasich gave the order to shoot at them, with a Russian tank being hit. The accompanying Russian vehicles came into fire as a result of several Ukrainian accurate shots, the Russian infantry had to disperse and artillery support was called. Russian soldiers hid on buildings of the town, while Russian vehicles attempted to target the tank. The Ukrainian tank later entered the flank of the Russians and started firing high-explosive fragmentation shells. However, a Russian anti-tank guided missile detonated the tank's ammunition, killing Vasich, Parkhomuk and Svynchuk. Ultimately, the crew destroyed six units of Russian war vehicles and contributed to the Ukrainian counteroffensive that kicked the Russians out of Makariv. All three of them were posthumously given the Hero of Ukraine award.

On 9 March, it was reported that there was heavy fighting in the city although it was still held by Ukraine. On 15 March, more Russian attacks on Makariv were repelled. On 17 March, the Ukrainian forces announced that Makariv was liberated from Russian forces and that the Ukrainian flag was now flying in the center of the town. However, the town remained under Russian shelling. On 21 March, the Chief of Police of Kyiv Oblast, Andriy Nebytov, visited Makariv, saying that it was under constant enemy shelling, that there were no people on the streets and that there was a high degree of destruction. On 22 March, the Ministry of Defence of Ukraine said Makariv was fully liberated. However, the next day, the mayor of Makariv, Vadim Tokar, declared that "the [Ukrainian] military doesn't control all of Makariv, only partially", and that "it's 100 percent no-go for civilians to return". He said that Russians controlled 15% of Makariv as of 23 March.

Also on 23 March, Ukrainian journalist Roman Tsimbalyuk reported that colonel Yuri Medvedev, commander of the Russian 37th Separate Guards Motor Rifle Brigade, had been run over with a tank by his own troops as a result of the unit losing nearly half of its men during the battle at Makariv. The date of the incident is unknown, but it had already been reported on 11 March by Ramzan Kadyrov, Head of the Chechen Republic, that Medvedev had been hospitalized. Several Western media reports speculated that Medvedev did not survive the attack.

On 25 March, Deputy Chief of Staff of the Command of the Land Forces of the Armed Forces of Ukraine, Oleksandr Gruzevych, said at a briefing that Makariv was in a "gray zone", with neither Russia nor Ukraine having full control over it. Authorities of the Kyiv Oblast likewise mentioned that intense fighting was still taking place in Makariv on 25 March. On 28 March, major general Mykola Zhyrnov announced that Russian forces had been defeated at the battle in Irpin and that "Makariv also continues to be controlled by our Armed Forces". On the same day, during a counteroffensive by the Armed Forces of Ukraine, the village of Motyzhyn near Makariv was recaptured after being under constant Russian occupation since 27 February. It was reported that the mayor of this village, Olga Sukhenko, and her family had been murdered by Russian occupying forces. Russian shelling of Makariv continued up to 31 March. On 1 April, Russian troops withdrew from the entire territory of the Makariv settlement hromada, and on 2 April, they had fully left the Kyiv Oblast.

== Aftermath ==
The civilians of Makariv suffered attacks and losses as a result of the battle. A video taken by a city security camera showed two elderly civilians in a car, probably trying to flee the city, stopping after seeing a Russian armored vehicle. This vehicle then opened fire on the car, killing both passengers. Another Russian attack on civilians took place on 7 March, when a bread factory was bombarded by airstrikes while around 30 people were there. The bodies of 13 civilians were extracted from the rubble and five people were rescued. If before the battle Makariv had around 15,000 inhabitants, only under 1,000 stayed during the battle.

On 8 April, Tokar said that according to preliminary estimates, the settlement had been destroyed by about 40%, and 132 civilians were found shot by Russian executioners. The murder of civilians of Makariv was similar to the Bucha massacre that occurred in the nearby town of Bucha. By late June, it was determined that the real number of civilians killed in Makariv and in the villages part of its hromada (municipality) was over 200. This included the elderly, people who had been shot in the head and with their hands tied to the back, and corpses with signs of torture. Tokar also mentioned cases of people having been forcibly displaced to Belarus and Russia.
