= Oleh Svynchuk =

Ukrainian soldier (1992–2022)

Oleh Svynchuk Hero of Ukraine
- Олег Свинчук
- Born: Oleh Anatoliyovych Svynchuk; 12 September 1992; Berezhtsi, Volyn Oblast, Ukraine
- Died: 8 March 2022 (aged 29); Makariv, Kyiv Oblast, Ukraine
- Military career
- Allegiance: Ukraine
- Branch: Ukrainian Ground Forces
- Service years: 2015–2016; 2021–2022
- Rank: Soldat
- Unit: 14th Separate Mechanized Brigade (Ukraine)
- Conflicts: Russo-Ukrainian War; Russian invasion of Ukraine; Kyiv offensive; Battle of Makariv †
- Awards: Order of the Gold Star (posthumously)

Oleh Anatoliyovych Svynchuk (Ukrainian: Олег Анатолійович Свинчук; 12 September 1992 – 8 March 2022) was a Ukrainian soldier of the 14th Separate Mechanized Brigade of the Armed Forces of Ukraine, a participant of Russian-Ukrainian war, and a Hero of Ukraine (posthumously).

== Military career ==
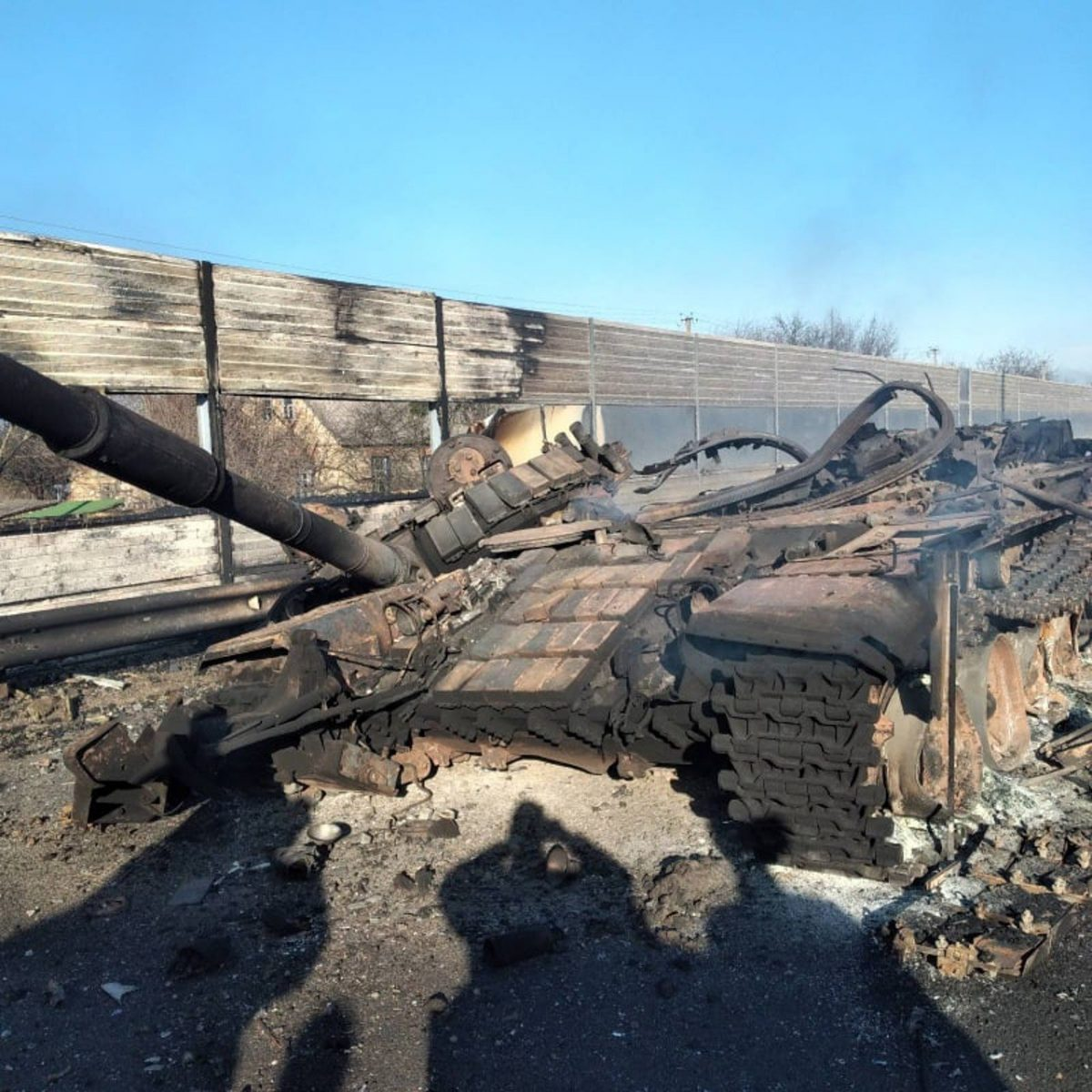
Makariv, Kyiv Oblast: the burned Russian T-72 tank destroyed by Oleh Svynchuk and his tankmen fellows Serhii Vasich and Vitaliy Parkhomuk.

Oleh Svynchuk was born on 12 September 1993 in the village of Berezhtsi (currently part of Vyshnivska hromada) Liuboml Raion of Volyn Oblast. In 2021, he finished Rymachi secondary school.

He joined Armed forces of Ukraine when he was 22 years old, where he served a term of service from 25 June until 24 November 2016.

On the 25 March 2021, Oleh signed a contract to be part of a military service. He became a tankman in 14th Separate Mechanized Brigade. During the 2022 Russian invasion of Ukraine he heroically served his duty protecting the northern parts of Ukraine with outnumbered Russian force.

== Russian invasion of Ukraine ==
On 8 March 2022, three tank crews of the 14th Brigade took part in the fight to liberate the city of Makariv from Russian occupiers. Serhii Vasich, another tankman of the 14th Brigade, managed to shoot a Russian tank from the first shot. One after another the occupants of the tanks were caught in fire. Russian infantry started to run away, soon they spotted the position of the Ukrainian tankmen, and called for artillery backup. Manoeuvring the Ukrainian's tankmen destroyed the enemy. The tank of senior sergeant Vasich entered occupant's flank and started firing high-explosive shells, kicking out infantry. Together three tank crews destroyed six units of machinery and significant force of enemy power. This allowed them to push back the enemy and during the counterattack the Ukrainian army liberated an important Kyiv locality, the urban-type settlement Makariv. However, an enemy anti-tank guided missile hit a Ukrainian T-64BV tank: it detonated ammunition and tore down a turret. The crew consisting of the commander of the senior sergeant Serhiy Vasich, the soldier Oleh Svynchuk and the senior soldier Vitaliy Parkhomuk were lost in battle.

== Family ==
Oleh was the youngest son in a large family. He was not married and had no children.

== Awards ==
- The title of "Hero of Ukraine" with the Order of the Golden Star (2022, posthumously) — for personal courage and heroism shown in defense of state sovereignty and territorial integrity of Ukraine, loyalty to the military oath.
