= 5th Guards Tank Division =

Tank division of the Soviet military

- Active: 1st formation: September 1945 – June 1957; 2nd formation: January 1965 – June 2009
- Country: Soviet Union (until 1991); Russia
- Branch: Soviet Army (until 1991); Russian Ground Forces
- Role: Armored Warfare
- Size: Division
- Garrison/HQ: Kyakhta (1966–2009)
- Patron: E. A. Shchadenko (2nd formation)
- Decorations: Order of the Red Banner (1st and 2nd formations); Order of the Red Star (2nd formation)
- Battle honours: Stalingrad (1st formation); Kiev (1st formation); Don (2nd formation); Budapest (2nd formation)

The 5th Guards Tank Division was an armored division of the Soviet Ground Forces and Russian Ground Forces, active from 1945 to 2009, in two different formations.

== First Formation ==
The 5th Guards "Stalingradsko-Kievskaya Order of Lenin Red Banner orders of Suvorov and Kutuzov" Tank Division was formed in September 1945 at Sherlovaya Gora, Chita Oblast, from the 5th Guards Tank Corps. In mid 1957 it became the 122nd Guards Motor Rifle Division. Half a century later, in June 2009, the descendant formation became the 35th Separate Guards Motor Rifle Brigade.

== Second Formation ==
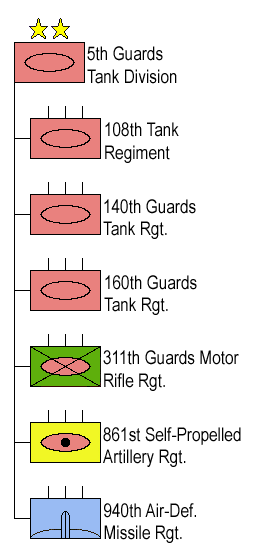
Structure of the 5th Guards Tank Division, late 2000s

The second formation drew its heritage from an illustrious Soviet World War II cavalry formation, the 5th Guards Cavalry Corps (Honorifics Don-Budapest Red Banner). After the end of World War II, the corps relocated from Ploiești in Romania, where it was part of the Southern Group of Forces, to Novocherkassk in Rostov Oblast, by the fall of 1945. The corps was reorganised as the 5th Guards Cavalry Division on 6 May 1946, part of the North Caucasus Military District. Its two cavalry divisions, the 11th Guards and 12th Guards, became regiments with the same numbers in the new division. A third regiment, the 7th Guards Cavalry Regiment, was renumbered from the 37th Guards Cavalry Regiment. On 6 September 1951, the division was awarded the honorific "named for E.A. Shchadenko", in honor of Soviet cavalry commander Efim Shchadenko. On 18 November 1954 18th Guards Heavy Tank Division was formed from 5th Guards Cavalry Division.

With the beginning of the Nikita Khrushchev era, the Strategic Rocket Forces were increasingly emphasised at the expense of the Ground Forces, and the Ground Forces were reduced and reorganized. On 5 March 1962, the division dropped the designation "Heavy" and became simply the 18th Guards Tank Division. Between 1 and 2 June 1962, the division was involved in the Novocherkassk massacre, the suppression of a strike caused by food shortages. On 11 January 1965, the division was renumbered the 5th Guards Tank Division to reflect its World War II title.

In April 1966, the division was transferred to Kyakhta, on the Mongolian–Russian border, to reinforce the Transbaikal Military District in the light of deteriorating relations with the People's Republic of China (PRC). On 22 February 1968, the division was awarded the Order of the Red Star. By May 1970, the division was part of the 29th Army. The division was expanded into the 48th Separate Guards Army Corps, as an experiment in rapid reaction units along with the Belorussian Military District's 120th Guards Motor Rifle Division, from 1982 to 1989. The three tank regiments and single motor rifle regiment of the division were expanded into two tank brigades and two motor rifle brigades, and the 1319th Air Assault Regiment and 373rd Separate Helicopter Regiment, both newly formed, were added to the corps.

Yuri Budanov commanded the division's 160th Guards Tank Regiment in 1999–2001.

The 57th Army Corps was upgraded in status to Army level in 2003. The 29th Army was subsequently disbanded.

Adam Geibel wrote that 5th "Don" Guards Tank Division, stationed in Buryatia, had received ‘a few’ of the initial group of 150 T-90s produced.

On 1 June 2009, the division became the 37th Guards Motor Rifle Brigade, as part of the 2008 Russian military reform. The brigade included more than 200 tracked vehicles and more than 100 wheeled vehicles in 2013. Elements of the brigade fought in the war in Donbas and were located in the Northern operational area in February 2015. The 37th's troops fought in the Battle of Debaltseve during this time, where their heavy equipment and weaponry was crucial to the defeat of Ukrainian forces in the battle. In September 2016, a conscript from the brigade was run over by a Kamaz truck while sleeping during an exercise. On 23 March 2022 during the Russian invasion of Ukraine, reports emerged from a Ukrainian journalist, social media video and Chechen leader Ramzan Kadyrov, that the brigade commander Colonel Yuri Medvedev had been run over by an armoured vehicle near Makariv driven by a mutinous soldier angered by the brigade's close to 50% combat losses suffered during the battle of Makariv. The commander was evacuated to Belarus, although reports of his condition varied.

== Subordinated units ==
The division's second formation included the following units:

- 108th Tank Regiment
- 140th Guards Tank Regiment
- 160th Guards Tank Regiment
- 311th Guards Motor Rifle Regiment
- 861st Self-Propelled Artillery Regiment
- 940th Anti-aircraft Rocket Regiment
