= Serhii Vasich =

Armed Forces of Ukraine senior sergeant (1971–2022)

Serhii Vasich Hero of Ukraine
- Сергій Васіч
- Born: Serhii Viktorovych Vasich; April 30, 1971; Batumi, Georgian SSR, USSR
- Died: March 8, 2022 (aged 50); Makariv, Kyiv Oblast, Ukraine
- Military career
- Allegiance: Ukraine
- Branch: Ukrainian Ground Forces
- Service years: 2015–2022
- Rank: senior sergeant
- Unit: 14th Separate Mechanized Brigade (Ukraine)
- Conflicts: Russo-Ukrainian War; Russian invasion of Ukraine; Kyiv offensive; Battle of Makariv †
- Awards: Order of the Gold Star (posthumously)

Serhii Viktorovych Vasich (Ukrainian: Сергій Вікторович Васіч; born 30 April 1971, Batumi, Georgian SSR, USSR – died March 8, 2022, near Makariv village, Kyiv region) was a senior sergeant of the Armed Forces of Ukraine, participant in the Russian-Ukrainian war, Hero of Ukraine (posthumously).

== Biography ==
Serhii Vasich was born into a military family in 1971 in Batumi (Georgia). Together with his parents, he traveled around the Soviet controlled world to military garrisons, so the army was his home. Father is an officer who served in tank troops. Since childhood, Serhii loved military equipment, especially tanks.

In high school, Serhii Vasich studied well, and later obtained a technical education. He was a comprehensively developed person, always read a lot and constantly improved his knowledge. After moving to Hrytsevo, he worked in the Hrytsevo Communications Department.

Served in the Armed Forces of Ukraine since 2015. Since 2018, he was a tank commander in the tank battalion of the 14th separate mechanized brigade. Defended Ukrainian positions in the Kyiv region.

== Russian invasion of Ukraine ==
On 8 March 2022, three tank crews of the 14th Brigade took part in the fight to liberate the city of Makariv from Russian occupiers. Serhii Vasich, as tankman of the 14th Brigade, managed to shoot a Russian tank from the first shot. One after another the enemy tanks were caught in fire. Russian infantry started to run away, soon they spotted the position of the Ukrainian tankmen, and called for artillery backup. Manoeuvring the Ukrainian tankmen destroyed the enemy. The tank of senior sergeant Vasich entered the occupant's flank and started firing high-explosive shells, kicking out infantry. Together three tank crews destroyed six units of machinery and a significant force of enemy power. This allowed them to push back the enemy and during the counterattack the Ukrainian army liberated the urban-type settlement Makariv. However, an enemy anti-tank guided missile hit a Ukrainian T-64BV tank: it detonated ammunition and tore down a turret. The crew of the senior sergeant Serhii Vasich, the soldier Oleh Svynchuk and the senior soldier Vitaliy Parkhomuk were lost in battle.

== Awards ==
- The title of "Hero of Ukraine" with the Order of the Golden Star (2022, posthumously) — for personal courage and heroism shown in defense of state sovereignty and territorial integrity of Ukraine, loyalty to the military oath.
