= Anatoliy Kryvolap =

Ukrainian painter

- Анатолій Криволап
- Born: September 11, 1946; Yahotyn, Ukrainian SSR, Soviet Union
- Education: National Academy of Visual Arts and Architecture
- Occupation: Painting
- Awards: Shevchenko National Prize (2012)
- Website: anatolykryvolap.com/persona

Anatoly Dmytrovych Kryvolap (Ukrainian: Анатолій Дмитрович Криволап, born 11 September 1946) is a Ukrainian artist, master of non-figurative painting, and full member of the National Academy of Arts of Ukraine.

Kryvolap is considered the most "expensive" modern artist in Ukraine. In 2011, at an auction in New York, the painting Steppe was sold for a record price for a Ukrainian painting.

== Biography ==
Kryvolap was born on 11 September 1946 in the village of Yahotyn, which was then part of the Ukrainian SSR in the Soviet Union. In 1976, he graduated from the Kyiv State Art Institute within the Faculty of Painting. He had originally enrolled in the academy in 1969 within the pedagogical faculty, but later changed his mind and switched to painting. After graduating, he was initially a follower of realistic painting and Impressionism, but in the mid-1980s he start incorporating Fauvist ideas into his works. He later also incorporated abstraction with Fauvism.

In 1990, after more than a decade of practicing art, he became a member of the National Union of Artists of Ukraine. From 1993 to 1995, Kryvolap actively participated in the activities of the Picturesque Reserve, known in the history of modern Ukrainian art of the art group. During this time, he was working on a series of paintings entitled "Ukrainian Motive". With Ukrainian Motive in the early 2000s, he gradually returned to landscapes, but still incorporated bold colours.

On 9 February 2012, Kryvolap became a laureate of the Shevchenko National Prize of Ukraine. Kryvolap was awarded in Fine Arts nomination for his Ukrainian Motive cycle, which included 50 abstract landscapes.

Since December 2016 – Member of the Taras Shevchenko National Prize Committee of Ukraine.

Between 2014 and 2019, alongside Ihor Stupachenko, he was one of the chief painters for the newly built Church of the Intercession in the village of Lypivka within Kyiv Oblast. He helped with the use of modern materials and the use of bold colours, and the work was first exhibited at the municipal art gallery "Lavra" before being installed on the church walls. He later created murals for the restored Church of the Intercession in 2023 after the original building was destroyed by Russian forces during their occupation of the area in 2022.

On 20 August 2025, he was awarded the National Legend of Ukraine for his significant contributions to Ukrainian culture by presidential decree of Volodymyr Zelenskyy.

== Personal life ==
Since 2001 he has lived in the village of Zasupoivka, which is near his hometown, Yahotyn, where he has worked ever since.

== Personal exhibitions ==
- 1992 – Dontі Gallery, Nuremberg, Germany.
- 1993 – D’art Gallery, Toulouse, France.
- 1996 – Kaspari Gallery, Fürth, Germany.
- 2000 – ARTEast Gallery, Kyiv.
- 2000 – Sovі art Center for Contemporary Art, Kyiv.
- 2003 – Person Gallery, Kyiv.
- 2004 – Karas Gallery, Kyiv.
- 2005 – Karas Gallery, Kyiv.
- 2006 – Sovі art Center for Contemporary Art, Kyiv.
- 2011 – "Landscape of the XXI Century". OntoArtGallery, Kyiv.
- 2012 – "Ukrainian Motive". Mironova Gallery, Kyiv.
- 2012–2013 – permanent exhibition in OntoArtGallery, Kyiv
