= Church of the Intercession, Lypivka, Kyiv Oblast =

Ukrainian Orthodox church in Lypivka, Ukraine

Church of the Intercession
- Церква Покрови Пресвятої Богородиці

Religion
- Affiliation: Orthodox Church of Ukraine

Location
- Location: Lypivka
- Interactive map of Church of the Intercession
- Coordinates: 50°30′49″N 29°48′05″E

Church of the Intercession (Ukrainian: Церква Покрови Пресвятої Богородиці) is an Orthodox parish church (OCU) in Lypivka of the Makariv settlement hromada, Bucha Raion, Kyiv Oblast, Ukraine. The church is a small copy of the Hagia Sophia Cathedral in Istanbul.

== History ==
In Lypivka, the first wooden church was built in 1730 at the expense of the owner Ihnatii Trypolskyi. The restoration and reconstruction of the church was completed in 1870. During World War II, it burned down as a result of a shell hit.

In 1947, a wooden house for worship was built near the lost religious building. Subsequently, this building was used as a household goods factory, a veterinary hospital, and the accounting department of the consumer cooperative.

The modern stone church was built with the financial support of Ukrainian film producer, film distributor, film expert and philanthropist of Polish origin Bohdan Batrukh on the site of the Intercession Church destroyed in the 1940s. In 2015–2022, the interior of the church was painted by artists Anatoliy Kryvolap and Ihor Stupachenko. In 2019 and 2023, some of the paintings were presented before installation at the Lavra City Art Gallery in Kyiv at the exhibition "Temple. Ukrainian Self-Identification" (curated by Yuri Komelkov, author of the idea – Tetiana Mironova).

During the full-scale Russian invasion, the church was destroyed. In particular, the dome, in which archangels, seraphim, and a pantocrator were already mounted, was damaged. The artists left the damaged paintings in this state for posterity and as an example of the destruction carried out by the Russian forces during their occupation of the area.

== Priests ==
- Andrii Dostoevskyi
- Hennadii Kharkovskyi – currently

== Sources ==
- Петренко, О. Липівка // Енциклопедія Сучасної України [Електронний ресурс] / Редкол. : І. М. Дзюба, А. І. Жуковський, М. Г. Железняк [та ін.]; НАН України, НТШ. — К. : Інститут енциклопедичних досліджень НАН України, 2016.
- "Lipówka, wś w pow. kijowskim, s. 291—292". Geographical Dictionary of the Kingdom of Poland (in Polish). 5. Warszawa: Kasa im. Józefa Mianowskiego. 1884. p. 291.
- Авраменко, О. Сакральний живопис в Україні ХХІ століття: розписи церкви Покрова Пресвятої Богородиці в селі Липівка Анатолієм Криволапом та Ігорем Ступаченком. 2014–2019 роки // Мистецтвознавство України, Київ, 2019, Вип. 19, s. 21–32.
