= Korolivka =

Korolivka (Ukrainian: Королівка) may refer to several places in Ukraine:

- Korolivka, Bucha Raion, Kyiv Oblast, village in Bucha Raion, Kyiv Oblast
- Korolivka, Zolochiv Raion, Lviv Oblast, village in Zolochiv Raion, Lviv Oblast
- Korolivka, Borshchiv urban hromada, Chortkiv Raion, Ternopil Oblast, village in Chortkiv Raion
- Korolivka, Zalishchyky Raion, village in the Zalishchyky Raion
