= Korolivka, Bucha Raion, Kyiv Oblast =

Village in Kyiv Oblast, Ukraine

Korolivka Королівка
- Village
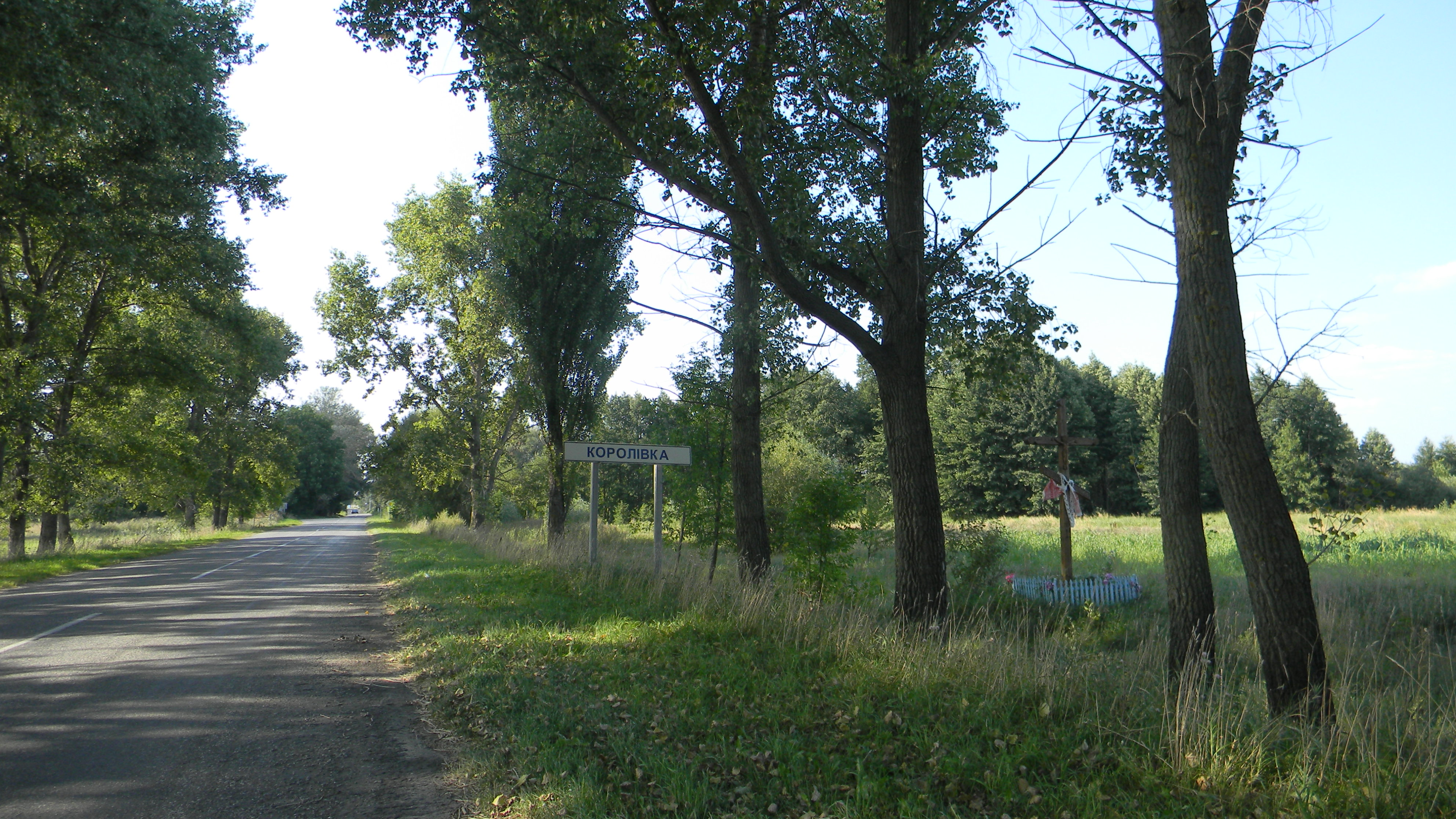

- Location within Kyiv Oblast Location within Ukraine
- Coordinates: 50°32′59″N 29°43′52″E
- Country: Ukraine
- Oblast: Kyiv
- Raion: Bucha
- Hromada: Makariv settlement hromada

Area
  - Total: 0.143 km^{2} (0.055 sq mi)
- Elevation: 169 m (554 ft)

Population (2001)
  - Total: 1,045
  - Density: 7,310/km^{2} (18,900/sq mi)
- Postal code: 08012
- Area code: +380 4578

Korolivka (Ukrainian: Королівка) is a village in Bucha Raion of Kyiv Oblast, Ukraine. It belongs to Makariv settlement hromada, one of the hromadas of Ukraine.

Until 18 July 2020, Korolivka was located in Makariv Raion. The raion was abolished that day as part of the administrative reform of Ukraine, which reduced the number of raions of Kyiv Oblast to seven. The area of Makariv Raion was split between Bucha and Fastiv, with Koroliv being transferred to Bucha Raion.

== Demographics ==
Native language as of the Ukrainian Census of 2001:

- Ukrainian 99.43%
- Others 0.57%
