= 37th Separate Guards Motor Rifle Brigade =

37th Guards Motor Rifle Brigade
- Active: 2009–present
- Country: Russia
- Branch: Russian Ground Forces
- Type: Mechanized infantry
- Size: Brigade
- Part of: 36th Combined Arms Army, Eastern Military District
- Garrison/HQ: Kyakhta (Buryatia)
- Patron: Ye. A. Shchadenko
- Engagements: Russo-Ukrainian War; War in Donbas; Russian invasion of Ukraine; Northern Ukraine campaign; Battle of Makariv; Eastern Ukraine campaign; 2024 Velyka Novosilka offensive
- Decorations: Guards; Order of the Red Banner; Order of the Red Star
- Battle honours: Budapest; Don Cossack

The 37th Guards Motor Rifle Don Cossack Budapest Red Banner Order of the Red Star Brigade named after Ye. A. Shchadenko (Note: Russian: 37-я отдельная гвардейская мотострелковая Будапештская Краснознамённая, ордена Красной Звезды Донская казачья бригада имени Е. А. Щаденко) is a motor rifle brigade of the Russian Ground Forces (Military Unit Number 69647). It is stationed at Kyakhta in Buryatia, part of the 36th Combined Arms Army of the Eastern Military District. The brigade has fought in the war in Donbas and the Russian invasion of Ukraine.

== Components ==
Due to its location in Kiakhta in Buryatia, this brigade has a high percentage of Buryat and other ethnic minority servicemen, many of whom adhere to Tibetan Buddhism. As a result, by 2021 it was the only Russian military unit with a Buddhist lama serving as a military chaplain.

The brigade included more than 200 tracked vehicles and more than 100 wheeled vehicles in 2013. According to 2015 data, the brigade was equipped with 40 T-72B3, 1 T-72BK, 120 BMP-2, 15 MT-LB, 18 BM 2B17-1 Tornado-G, 36 2S3M Akatsiya 152 mm howitzers, 18 × 120 mm mortar 2S12 Sani, 6 × 100 mm MT-12 Rapira, 12 9K114 Shturm-S, 36 BTR-80, 12 BM 9A33BM2(3) Osa, 6 BM 9A34(35) Strela-10, and 6 ZSU 23-4 Shilka.

== History ==
On 1 June 2009, the 5th Guards Tank Division became the 37th Guards Motor Rifle Brigade, as part of the 2008 Russian military reforms. The 5th Guards Tank Division (Second Formation) itself dated to 1965, and its predecessor 5th Guards Cavalry Corps to 1942.

=== Donbas (2014–2022) ===
Elements of the brigade fought in the war in Donbas and were located in the Northern operational area in February 2015. The 37th's troops fought in the Battle of Debaltseve during this time, where their heavy equipment and weaponry was crucial to the defeat of Ukrainian forces in the battle. In September 2016, a conscript from the brigade was run over by a Kamaz truck while sleeping during an exercise. A large number of incidents and deaths in the brigade were reported during the 2010s, including two court cases involving beatings by superiors, suicides, and accidental shootings. Conscripts of the brigade repeatedly complained to the Commissioner for Human Rights of Buryatia regarding extortion by the unit before their demobilization, poor clothing, and inadequate medical care.

=== Russian invasion of Ukraine ===
The brigade was committed to the Russian invasion of Ukraine. Elements of the brigade participated in the Kyiv offensive. On 23 March, Ukrainian journalist Roman Tsimbalyuk claimed that the brigade commander, Colonel Yuri Medvedev, had been run over by his own troops due to reportedly being dissatisfied with the about 50 percent casualties that the unit had suffered during the battle of Makariv. This claim was widely repeated by Western intelligence officials as a sign of widespread Russian demoralization during the war. One official said that the colonel died, but this statement was later retracted over conflicting evidence. After the Russian retreat from Kyiv Oblast, the brigade was deployed to eastern Ukraine.

On 20 April, residents of Kyakhta, the city of the unit's garrison, purchased a quadrocopter UAV to be sent to the brigade in Ukraine using funds from a donation drive.

Elements of the 37th Separate Guards Motor Rifle Brigade are suspected of participation to war crimes in Motyzhyn near Bucha during the Russian invasion of Ukraine.

On 31 March 2024, the Ukrainian 47th Separate Mechanized Brigade claimed to have repelled the 37th Guards Brigade near Avdiivka, forcing it to be withdrawn, and claimed to have "eliminated" 1,300 Russian soldiers and 30 units of equipment over the past month.

On 19 July 2026, Militarnyi said that a member of the brigade, Artem Belikov, who Ukrainian investigators suspect was involved in carrying out orders to open fire on two civilian cars attempting to evacuate in March 2022, killing a man, woman and their 15-year old daughter had been reported as killed by Ukrainian forces.

== Structure ==
The brigade includes:

- Headquarters
- 1st, 2nd, 3rd motor rifle battalions
- Rifle company (sniper)
- Tank battalion
- 1st and 2nd self-propelled howitzer battalions
- Reactive Artillery Battalion
- Anti-Tank Artillery Battalion
- Anti-Aircraft Missile Battalion
- Anti-Aircraft Missile Artillery Battalion
- Reconnaissance Battalion
- Engineer Battalion
- Chemical Defense Company
- Headquarters Battalion (communications)
- UAV company
- Electronic Warfare Company
- Headquarters and artillery reconnaissance battery (chief of artillery)
- Repair and Recovery Battalion
- Materiel Support Battalion
- Commandant's Company
- Medical Company

== See also ==
- 33rd Motor Rifle Division
- Fragging
