= Kodra =

Kodra may refer to:

- Ibrahim Kodra, Albanian artist
- Lindita Kodra, Albanian shooter
- Kodra, Kyiv Oblast, a rural settlement in Ukraine
- Kodra grain (Paspalum scrobiculatum), a traditional grain cultivated in India and Africa
