= Kodra, Ukraine =

Rural locality in Kyiv Oblast, Ukraine

Kodra Кодра
- Rural settlement
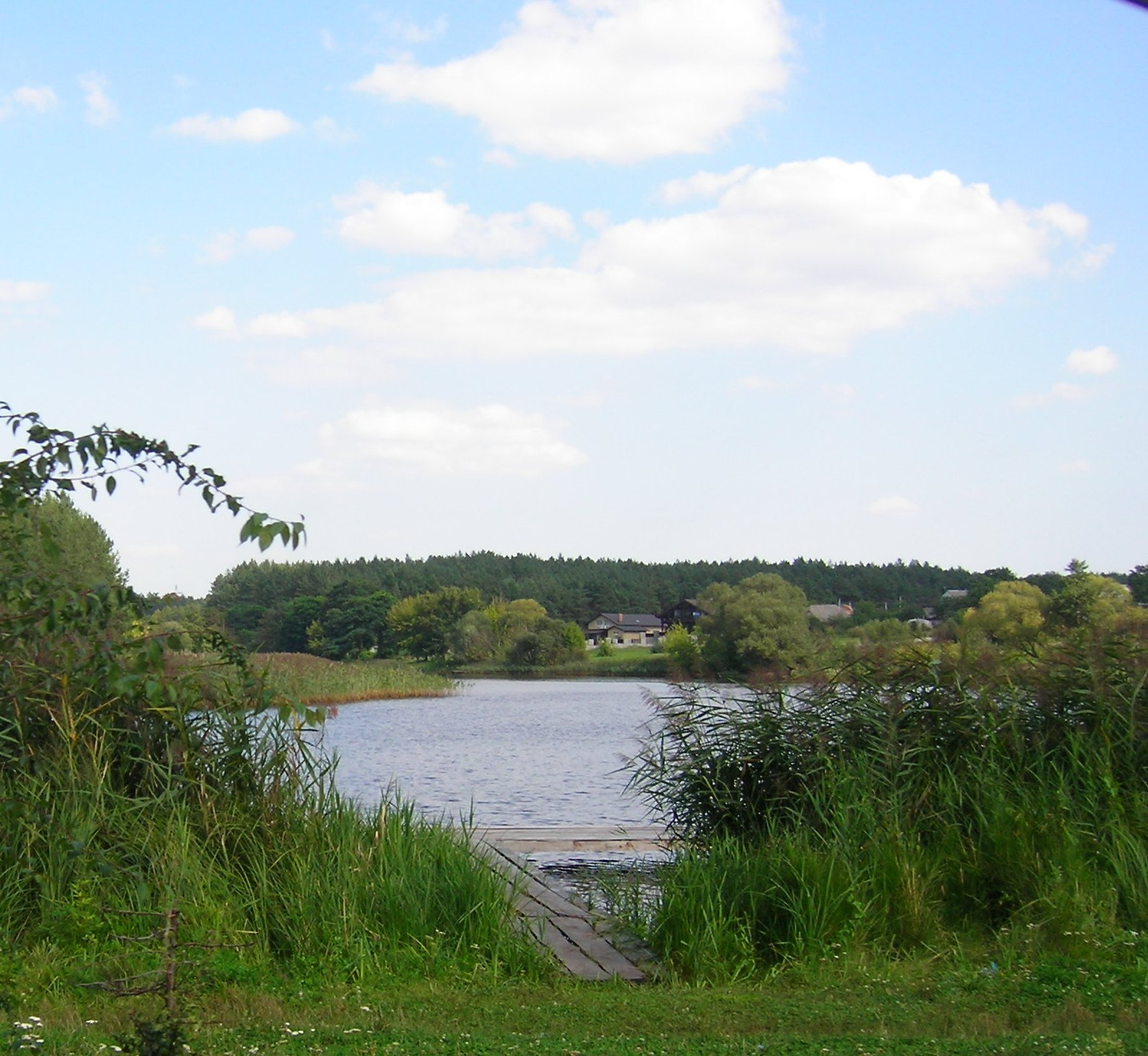

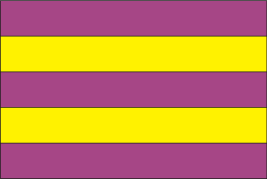
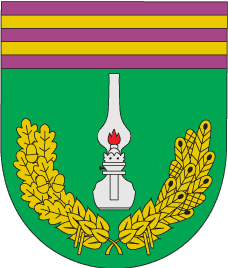
- Flag Coat of arms

- Location of Kodra in Ukraine
- Coordinates: 50°35′39″N 29°34′00″E
- Country: Ukraine
- Oblast: Kyiv Oblast
- District: Bucha Raion
- Founded: 1600
- Town status: 1938

Government
  - Town Head: Anatoliy Zahlynskyi

Population (2001)
  - Total: 1,756
- Time zone: UTC+2 (EET)
  - Summer (DST): UTC+3 (EEST)
- Postal code: 08010
- Area code: +380 4478
- Website: http://rada.gov.ua/

Kodra (Ukrainian: Кодра) is a rural settlement in Bucha Raion (district) of Kyiv Oblast (province) in northern Ukraine. It belongs to Makariv settlement hromada, one of the hromadas of Ukraine. The population was 1,756 at the 2001 Ukrainian census. Current population: 1,368 (2022 estimate).

== History ==
Kodra was founded in 1600 as a village, and it retained its village status until it was upgraded to that of an urban-type settlement in 1938.

Until 18 July 2020, Kodra belonged to Makariv Raion. The raion was abolished that day as part of the administrative reform of Ukraine, which reduced the number of raions of Kyiv Oblast to seven. The area of Makariv Raion was split between Bucha and Fastiv Raions, with Kodra being transferred to Bucha Raion.

On 26 January 2024, a new law entered into force which abolished the status of urban-type settlement, and Kodra became a rural settlement.

== Economy ==
Kodra is a centre of peat production.
