= Olga Sukhenko =

Ukrainian politician (1971–2022)

Olga Petrivna Sukhenko
- Ольга Сухенко

Village head of Motyzhyn
- In office 9 April 2010 – 24 March 2022
- Preceded by: Unknown
- Succeeded by: None

Personal details
- Born: 19 October 1971 Kyiv, Ukrainian SSR, Soviet Union (now Kyiv, Ukraine)
- Died: 24 March 2022 (aged 50) Motyzhyn, Ukraine
- Cause of death: Assassination

Olga Petrivna Sukhenko (Ukrainian: Ольга Петрівна Сухенко; 19 October 1971 – 24 March 2022), also known as Olha Sukhenko, was a Ukrainian politician who served as village head of Motyzhyn, Kyiv Region, and was killed by Russian soldiers during the Bucha massacre.

== Early life and education ==
Olga Petrivna Sukhenko was born on 19 October 1971 and attended Kyiv secondary school #127 before studying merchandising at Kyiv Commercial College from 1992 to 1994. After that she studied at the Kyiv State Academy of Water Transport where, after three years, she received an accounting qualification. Sukhenko's career included working as a baker, as well as in sales, and in Motyzhin's kindergarten.

== Political career ==
Sukhenko served as village head for over a decade in Motyzhyn, a village with a population of about 1000 people, located about 25 miles west of Kyiv. Her role included informal dispute resolution, building improvements, and organizing cultural events. In 2002, she was elected as the secretary of the village council before becoming the chair in 2006. In 2017, as mayor, she visited World War II veteran Fyodor Klimenko of Motyzhin at a nursing home in Gruzskoe and congratulated his efforts towards victory over the Nazis. On 27 February 2022, Sukhenko posted to Facebook after the arrival of the Russian army, "There are foreign bastards in our village. Take care. Don't leave your homes. Keep calm." After the 2022 Russian invasion of Ukraine began, thousands of people had fled to the village from Kyiv, and in early March, she organised a civilian evacuation convoy. During the occupation by the Russian army, she also arranged for the delivery and distribution of food and medication. Igor Sukhenko, her husband, and others also provided information to the Ukrainian army about Russian army locations and movements.

== Assassination ==
=== Abduction and murder ===
According to Ukrainian officials and local residents, on 23 March, Sukhenko, her husband, Igor, and their son Oleksandr (a professional footballer who had played for SC Chaika Petropavlivska Borshchahivka) were abducted by Russian soldiers, tortured, then executed by shooting, and buried in a shallow pit in a forest. Sukhenko and her husband were taken earlier in the day and Oleksandr was taken in the evening.

=== Body discovery ===
Their bodies were found by Ukrainian soldiers after the Russian army occupation of the village ended, along with two other bodies in the same area. According to BBC News, "It is believed that she and her family were killed on suspicion of helping Ukrainian soldiers." Ukrainian Deputy Prime Minister Iryna Vereshchuk said Sukhenko is one of twelve municipality leaders who were captured by Russian forces, and the Ukrainian government learned of her death on 2 April 2022.
