= Lypivka, Kyiv Oblast =

Village in Kyiv Oblast, Ukraine

Lypivka Липівка
- Village
- Location in Kyiv Oblast
- Coordinates: 50°30′40″N 29°48′26″E
- Country: Ukraine
- Oblast: Kyiv Oblast
- Raion: Bucha Raion
- Hromada: Makariv
- Time zone: UTC+2 (EET)
  - Summer (DST): UTC+3 (EEST)
- Postal code: 08014

Lypivka (Ukrainian: Липівка) is a village in Makariv settlement hromada, Bucha Raion, Kyiv Oblast, Ukraine.

== History ==
It was first mentioned in 1506. There are 7 mounds near the village.

== Religion ==
- Church of the Intercession (stone)

== Sources ==
- "Lipówka, wś w pow. kijowskim, s. 291—292". Geographical Dictionary of the Kingdom of Poland (in Polish). 5. Warszawa: Kasa im. Józefa Mianowskiego. 1884. p. 291.
