= Byshiv, Kyiv Oblast =

Rural locality in Kyiv Oblast, Ukraine

Byshiv Бишів
- Village
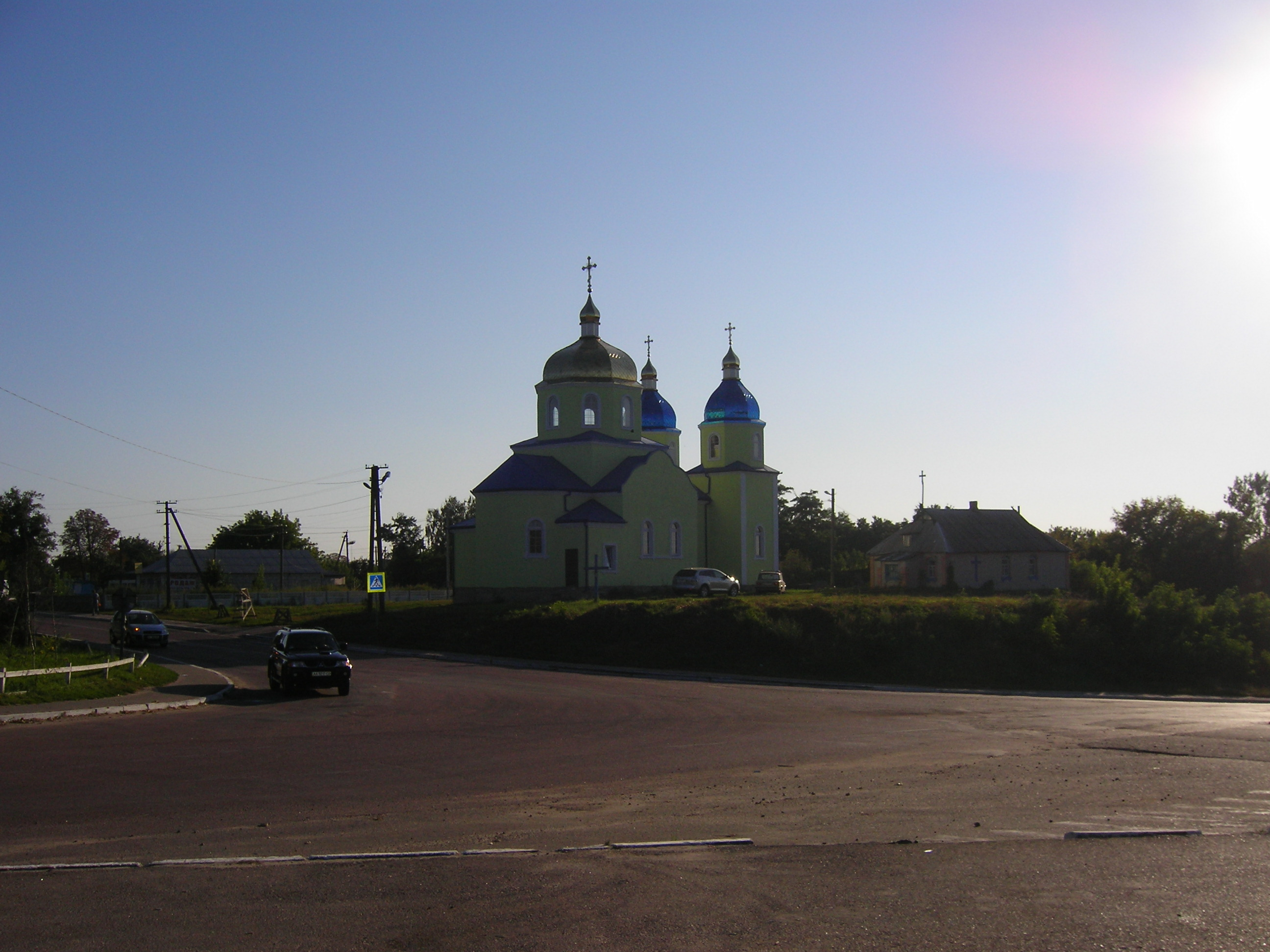

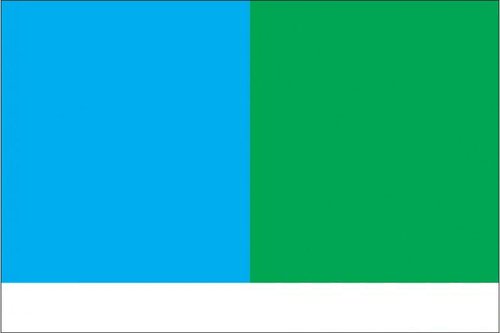
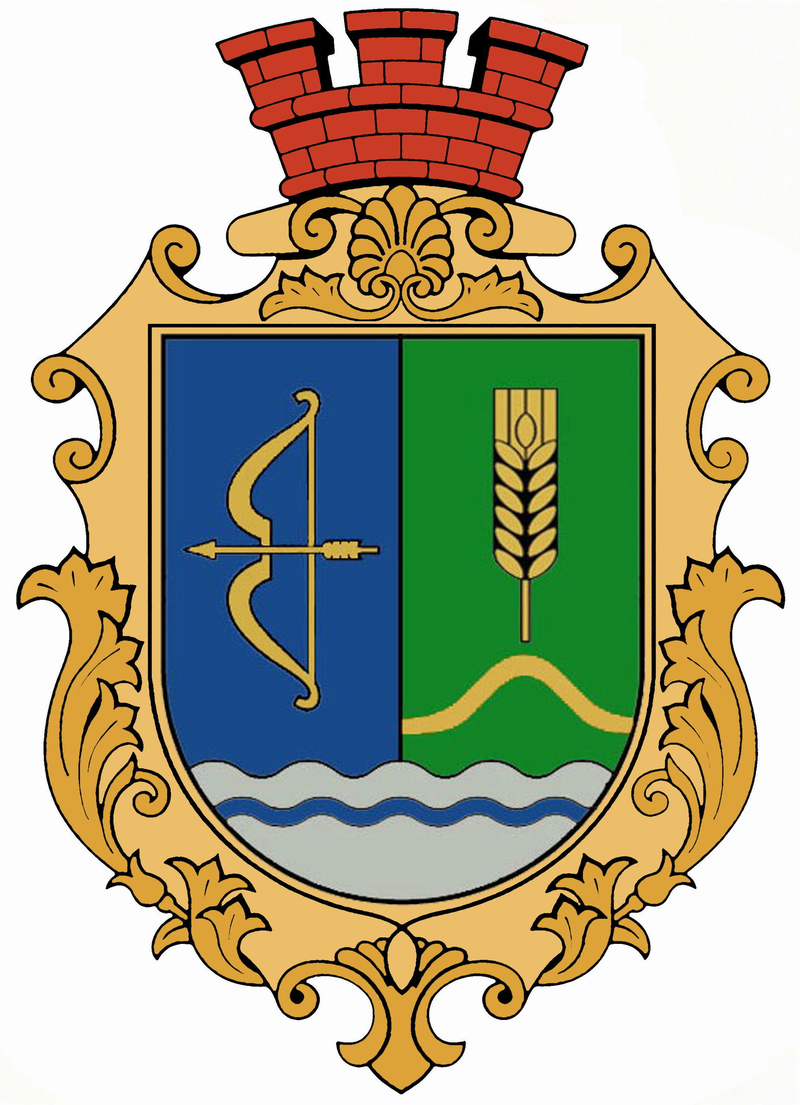
- Flag Coat of arms

- Location within Kyiv Oblast Location within Ukraine
- Coordinates: 50°16′02″N 29°52′54″E
- Country: Ukraine
- Oblast: Kyiv
- Raion: Fastiv
- Hromada: Byshiv rural hromada

Area
  - Total: 1.094 km^{2} (0.422 sq mi)
- Elevation: 172 m (564 ft)

Population (2004)
  - Total: 2,873
  - Density: 2,626/km^{2} (6,802/sq mi)
- Postal code: 08072
- Area code: +380 4578

Byshiv (Ukrainian: Бишів) is a village in Fastiv Raion of Kyiv Oblast, Ukraine. It hosts the administration of Byshiv rural hromada, one of the hromadas of Ukraine.

Byshiv formerly served as a centre of its own district. Until 18 July 2020, Byshiv was located in Makariv Raion. The raion was abolished that day as part of the administrative reform of Ukraine, which reduced the number of raions of Kyiv Oblast to seven. The area of Makariv Raion was split between Bucha and Fastiv, with Byshiv being transferred to Bucha Raion.

== Geography ==
Byshiv is located on the Dnieper Upland.

== Demographics ==
Native language as of the Ukrainian Census of 2001:

- Ukrainian 96.55%
- Russian 2.96%
- Others 0.17%
