= Gruzskoye =

Gruzskoye Грузское
- Selo
- Location within Belgorod Oblast Location within Russia
- Coordinates: 50°31′N 35°58′E
- Country: Russia
- Region: Belgorod Oblast
- District: Borisovsky District
- Time zone: UTC+3:00

Gruzskoye (Russian: Грузское) is a rural locality (a selo) and the administrative center of Gruzchanskoye Rural Settlement, Borisovsky District, Belgorod Oblast, Russia. The population was 1,033 as of 2010. There are 8 streets.

== Geography ==
Gruzskoye is located 19 km southwest of Borisovka (the district's administrative centre) by road. Zozuli is the nearest rural locality.
