= Motyzhyn =

Village in Bucha Raion, Kyiv Oblast, Ukraine

Motyzhyn Мотижин
- Village
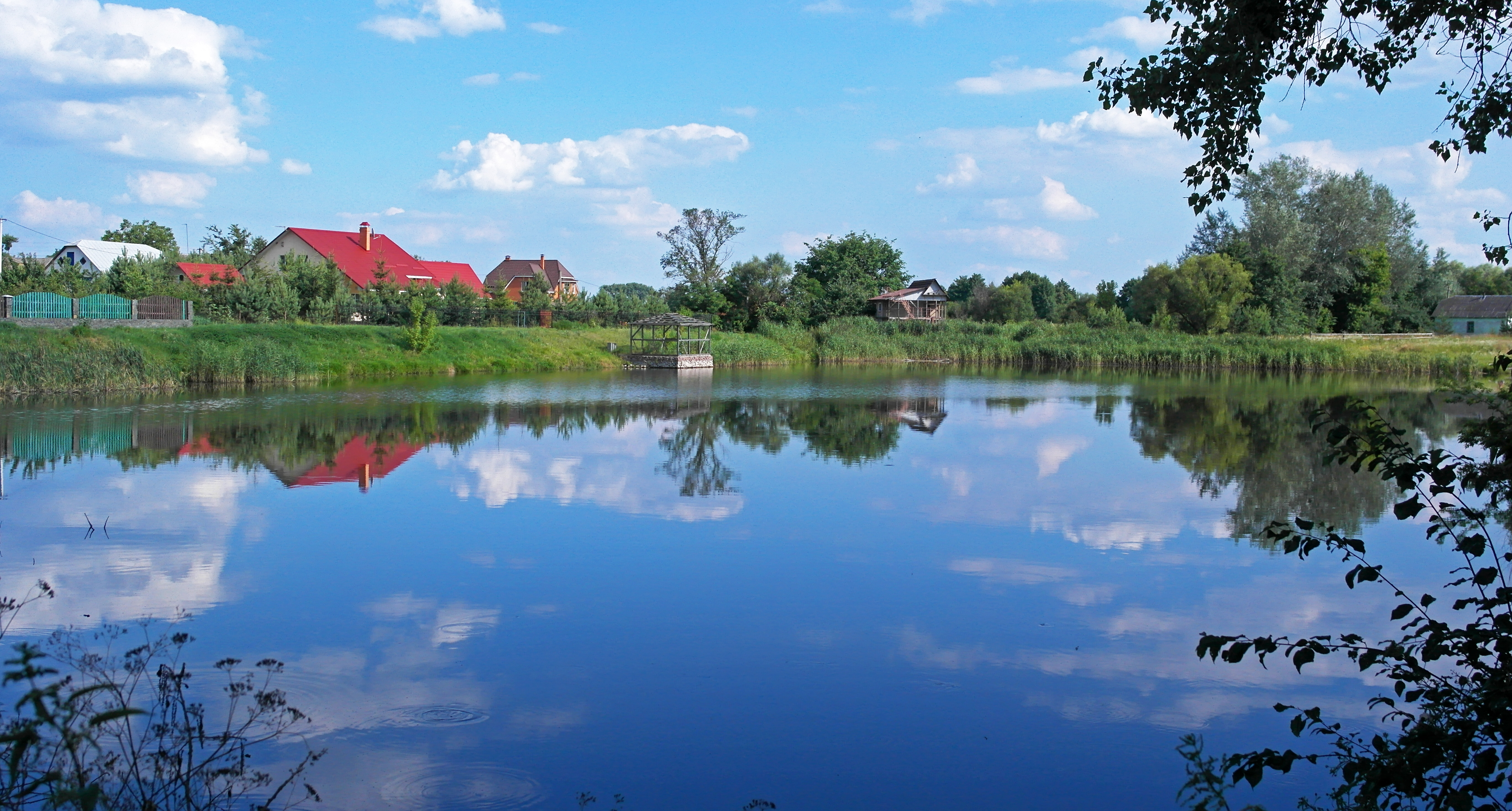

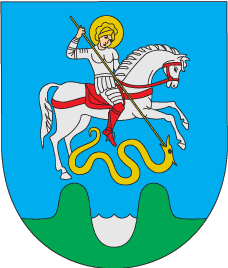
- Flag Seal
- Interactive map of Motyzhyn
- Location of Motyzhin within Ukraine Motyzhyn (Ukraine)
- Coordinates: 50.381667°N 29.936389°E
- Country: Ukraine
- Oblast: Kyiv Oblast
- District: Bucha Raion
- Status: 1162

Area
  - Total: 4.43 km^{2} (1.71 sq mi)
- Elevation: 184 m (604 ft)

Population (2001 census)
  - Total: 1,011
  - Density: 228/km^{2} (591/sq mi)
- Time zone: UTC+2 (EET)
  - Summer (DST): UTC+3 (EEST)
- Postal code: 08060
- Area code: +380 4578

Motyzhyn (Ukrainian: Мотижин, IPA: [moˈtɪʒɪn]) is a village in Bucha Raion, Kyiv Oblast, Ukraine. It is located 45 kilometres (28 mi) west of the capital Kyiv. It belongs to Makariv settlement hromada, one of the hromadas of Ukraine.

Until 18 July 2020, Motyzhyn was located in Makariv Raion. The raion was abolished that day as part of the administrative reform of Ukraine, which reduced the number of raions of Kyiv Oblast to seven. The area of Makariv Raion was split between Bucha and Fastiv Raions, with Motyzhyn being transferred to Bucha Raion.

== Attractions ==
- Dobropark: 300 hectare landscape garden founded by entrepreneur Ihor Ihorovych Dobrutskyi to promote folk culture in Ukraine and serve as a location for exhibitions, concerts and cultural events.

== History ==
In late February 2022, Motyzhyn came under heavy attack due to its position on the Northern front of the Russian invasion of Ukraine.

In April 2022, the Ukrainian interior ministry reported that Olga Sukhenko, the mayor, and her family were shot, killed and buried in a shallow grave. Their bodies were found after Russian troops withdrew from the area. Motyzhyn had been occupied by Russian forces during the 2022 Russian invasion of Ukraine from 27 February until its liberation on 28 March.

In August 2022, it was estimated that the damaged caused to Motyzhyn was estimated to be UAH 279.4m or $10.1m. 527 buildings were destroyed or damaged, including 479 residential buildings.
