= Byshiv rural hromada =

Byshiv rural hromada Бишівська селищна громада
- Hromada
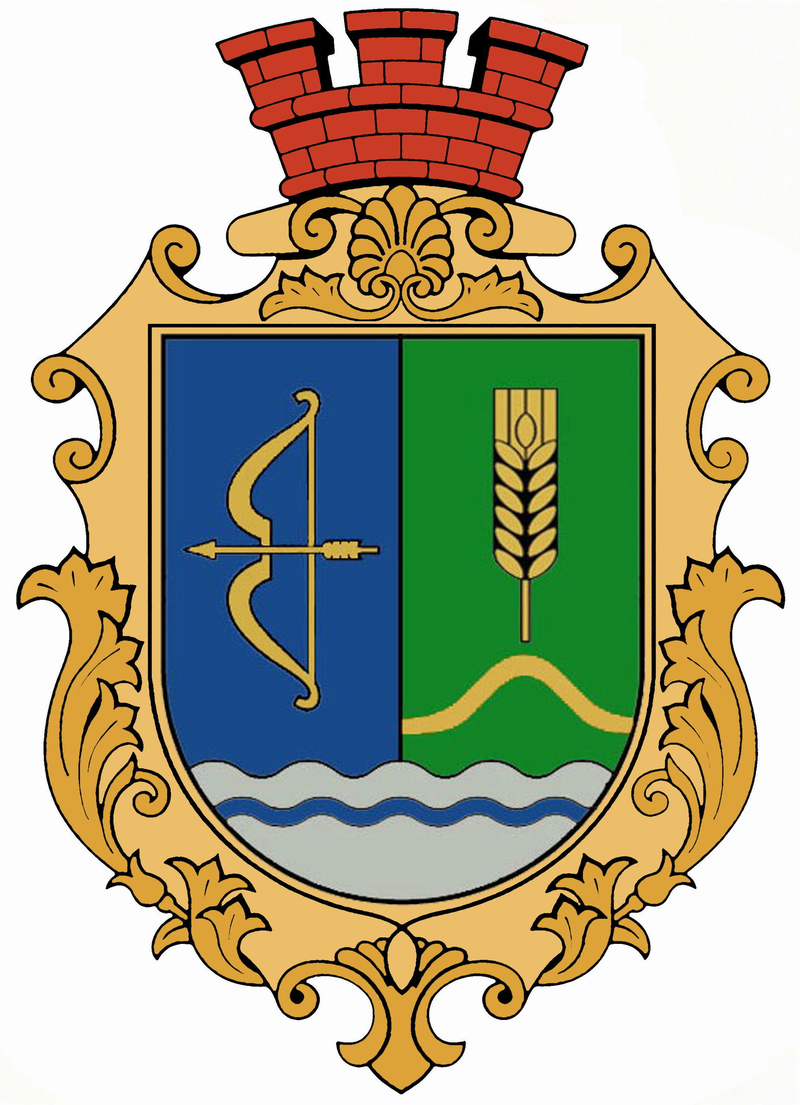
- Seal
- Interactive map of Byshiv rural hromada
- Country: Ukraine
- Oblast: Kyiv Oblast
- Raion: Fastiv Raion

Area
  - Total: 279.5 km^{2} (107.9 sq mi)

Population (2020)
  - Total: 6,073
  - Density: 21.73/km^{2} (56.28/sq mi)
- Settlements: 15
- Villages: 15

Byshiv rural hromada (Ukrainian: Бишівська селищна громада) is a hromada of Ukraine, located in Fastiv Raion, Kyiv Oblast. Its administrative center is the village of Byshiv.

It has an area of 279.5 square kilometres (107.9 mi^{2}) and a population of 6,073, as of 2020.

The hromada contains 15 settlements, which are all villages:

- Byshiv
- Vesela Slobidka
- Horobiivka
- Hruzke
- Kozychanka
- Leonivka
- Lyshnia
- Lubske
- Mostyshche
- Novi Opachychi
- Osykove
- Ferma
- Chornohorodka
- Yablunivka
- Yasnohorodka

== See also ==
- List of hromadas of Ukraine
