= Makariv Raion =

Former subdivision of Kyiv Oblast, Ukraine

Makariv Raion Макарівський район
- Raion
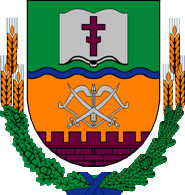
- Flag Coat of arms

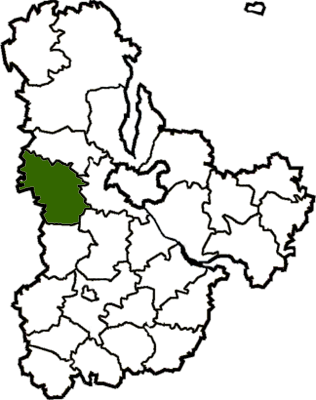
- Coordinates: 50°25′8″N 29°46′38″E
- Country: Ukraine
- Region: Kyiv Oblast
- Disestablished: 18 July 2020
- Admin. center: Makariv
- Subdivisions: List: — city councils; — settlement councils; — rural councils; Number of localities: — cities; — urban-type settlements; 67 — villages; — rural settlements

Population (2020)
  - Total: 35,640
- Time zone: UTC+02:00 (EET)
  - Summer (DST): UTC+03:00 (EEST)
- Area code: +380
- Website: https://web.archive.org/web/20140403043354/http://makariv.org.ua/

Makariv Raion (Ukrainian: Макарівський район) was a raion (district) in Kyiv Oblast of Ukraine. Its administrative center was the urban-type settlement of Makariv. The raion was abolished on 18 July 2020 as part of the administrative reform of Ukraine, which reduced the number of raions of Kyiv Oblast to seven. The area of Makariv Raion was split between Bucha and Fastiv Raions. The last estimate of the raion population was 35,640 (2020 est.).

At the time of disestablishment, the raion consisted of two hromadas,

- Byshiv rural hromada with the administration in the selo of Byshiv, transferred to Fastiv Raion;
- Makariv settlement hromada with the administration in Makariv, transferred to Bucha Raion;
