= 14th Mechanized Brigade =

Ukrainian Ground Forces unit

- 14-та окрема механізована бригад
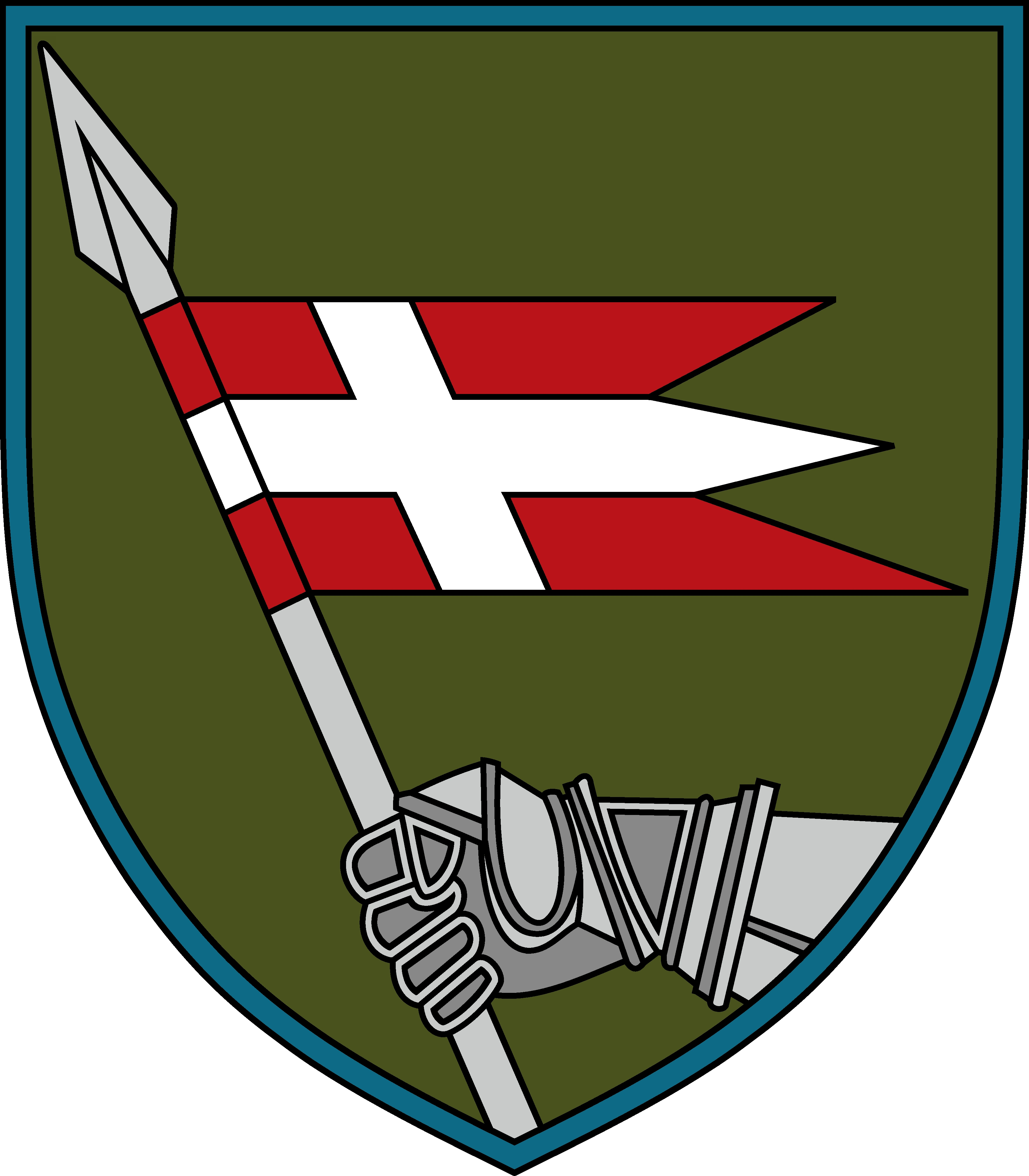
- Shoulder Sleeve Insignia
- Active: 1 December 2014 – Present
- Country: Ukraine
- Branch: Ukrainian Ground Forces
- Type: Mechanized Infantry
- Part of: Operational Command West
- Garrison/HQ: Volodymyr, Volyn Oblast
- Patron: Roman the Great
- Engagements: Russo-Ukrainian War: 2022 Ukrainian Kharkiv counteroffensive
- Decorations: For Courage and Bravery

Commanders
- Current commander: Col. Taras Maksimov
- Notable commanders: Vasyl Lapchuk † (Deputy commander)

Insignia
- Former sleeve insignia

The 14th Mechanized Brigade named after Prince Roman the Great (Ukrainian: 14-та окрема механізована бригада імені князя Романа Великого, romanized: 14-ta okrema mekhanizovana bryhada imeni kniazia Romana Velykoho, abbreviated 14 ОМБр, 14 OMBr) is a unit of the Ukrainian Ground Forces formed in December 2014. It is based in Volodymyr as part of Operational Command West. The brigade has been actively participating in the ongoing conflict in eastern Ukraine, as a result of the Russian invasion in 2022.

== History ==
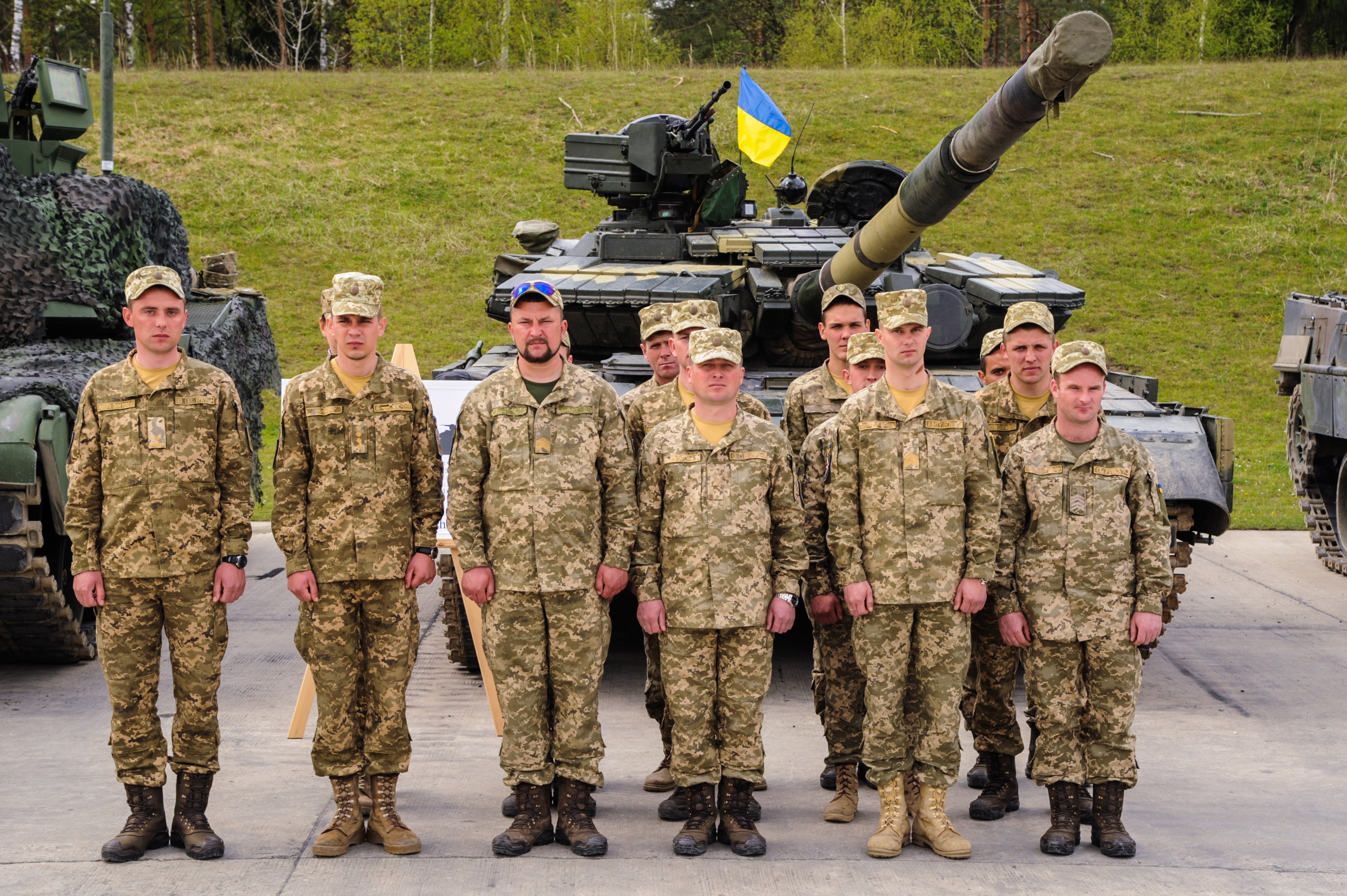
Members of the 14th Mechanized Brigade in May 2017

The 14th Mechanized Brigade was established on 1 December 2014, in Volodymyr, Ukraine and was led by Colonel Oleksandr Zhakun. The brigade was formed from the remains of the 51st Mechanized Brigade and new personnel. The brigade included a reactive artillery battalion, a tank battalion with new tanks from the Lviv Tank Factory, an antitank battery, and a repair battalion. The 1st Territorial Defence Battalion "Volyn" joined the brigade as the 99th Mechanized Infantry Battalion. The brigade was sent to defend Krasnohorivka and Marinka in the Donbas region in June 2015. In July 2017, the brigade participated in military exercises in Luhansk region using the UR-77 remote demining technique. On 14 October 2019, the brigade was granted the honorific "Roman the Great", after the twelfth-century ruler of Novgorod, Volyn, and Halych who founded the Romanovich branch of the Rurik dynasty.

The 3rd Battalion of the 14th Brigade was involved in blocking roads from Belarus towards Ovruch in the Zhytomyr Oblast in the first days of the Russian invasion of Ukraine.

The 14th Mechanized Brigade was involved in several battles of the Russia-Ukraine war. On 8 March 2022, its tank crews destroyed six Russian tanks in the battle of Makariv. In the same battle, three crew members were killed. On 13 April 2022, the brigade used Bayraktar drones to correct fire on a Russian military column, attacking it with 122mm 21-gerbral volley reactive fire systems. President Volodymyr Zelenskyy recognized the 14th Mechanized Brigade for its contribution to the Kharkiv offensive, which resulted in the capture of Kupiansk and the cities of Velykyi Burluk and Vovchansk near the Ukrainian-Russian border. The brigade was involved in a pincer attack that led to the capture of Hnylytsia and Artemivka along the Donets. On 12 September 2022, footage was published of the 14th Brigade raising the Ukrainian flag at Ternova in Kharkiv Oblast on the Russia–Ukraine border.

In November 2023, it was reported that the 14th Mechanized Brigade was operating in the Kharkiv Oblast near the village of Pershotravneve. As of February 2024, the brigade was still operating on the Kupiansk front.

On 5 May 2023, President Volodymyr Zelenskyy awarded the unit the honorary "For Courage and Bravery" as a result of their actions during the war.

On 24 April 2026, the brigade commander was removed from his post following reports on social media that described regular food and water shortages at the brigade's positions. The Ukrainian General Staff accused the command of losing positions, falsifying reports and failing to organize steady supply in conditions complicated by Russian strikes on Oskil river crossings. Colonel Taras Maksimov was appointed new commander.

== Structure ==
As of 2024 the brigade's structure is as follows:

- 14th Mechanized Brigade, Volodymyr
  - Brigade Headquarters and Headquarters Company
  - 1st Mechanized Battalion
  - 2nd Mechanized Battalion
    - UAV Strike Company "V Legion"
  - 3rd Mechanized Battalion
  - Tank Battalion
  - 1st Motorized Battalion "Volyn"
  - 14th Regiment of Unmanned Aviation Complexes
  - Field Artillery Regiment
    - Headquarters and Target Acquisition Battery
    - 1st Self-propelled Artillery Battalion (2S1 Gvozdika)
    - 2nd Self-propelled Artillery Battalion (M109A4BE)
    - Rocket Artillery Battalion (BM-21 Grad)
    - Anti-Tank Artillery Battalion
  - Anti-Aircraft Defense Battalion
  - Reconnaissance Company
  - Attack Drone Unit "Lituny" ("Aviators")
  - FPV Drone Unit "Kharon"
  - Engineer Battalion
  - Logistics Battalion
  - Maintenance Battalion
  - Signal Company
  - Radar Company
  - Medical Company
  - Chemical, Biological, Radiological and Nuclear Defense Protection Company
  - Brigade Band
