= Makariv settlement hromada =

Makariv settlement hromada Макарівська селищна громада
- Hromada
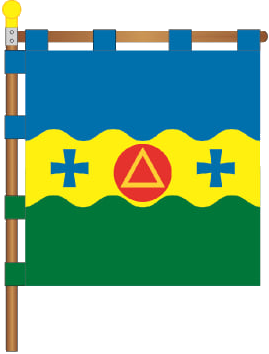
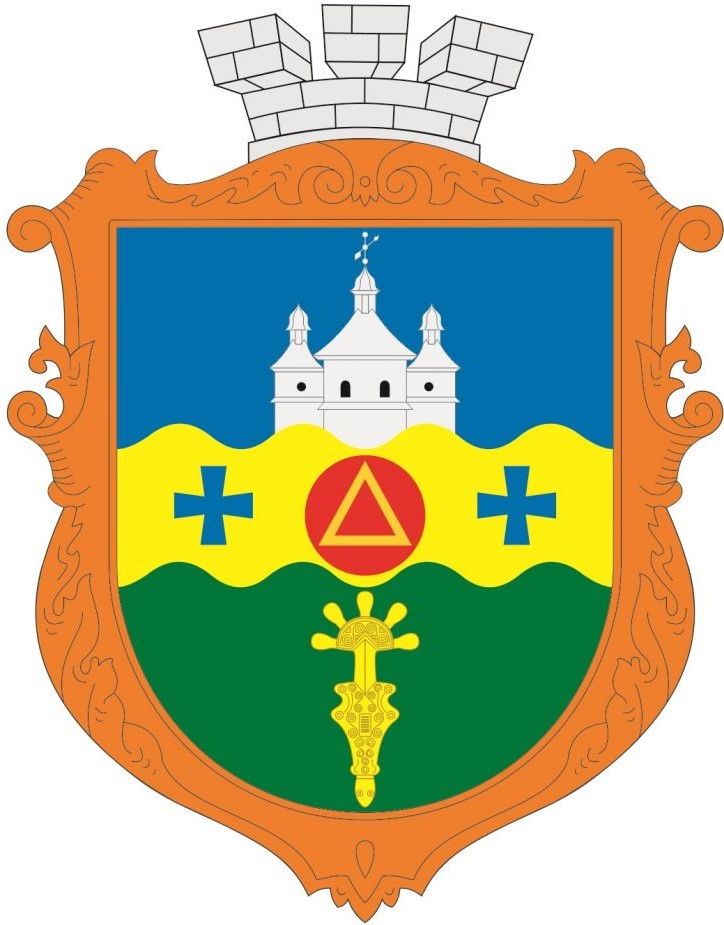
- Flag Seal
- Interactive map of Makariv settlement hromada
- Country: Ukraine
- Oblast: Kyiv
- Raion: Bucha

Area
  - Total: 1,012.3 km^{2} (390.9 sq mi)

Population (2020)
  - Total: 27,352
  - Density: 27.020/km^{2} (69.981/sq mi)
- Settlements: 49
- Villages: 47
- Towns: 2

Makariv settlement hromada (Ukrainian: Макарівська селищна громада) is a hromada of Ukraine, located in Bucha Raion, Kyiv Oblast. Its administrative center is the town of Makariv.

It has an area of 1,012.3 square kilometres (390.9 mi^{2}) and a population of 27,352, as of 2020.

The hromada includes 49 settlements: 2 towns (Makariv and Kodra), and 47 villages:

- Andriivka
- Berezivka
- Borivka
- Velykyi Karashyn
- Vyshehrad
- Vitrivka
- Volosin
- Havronshchyna
- Zabuiannia
- Zavalivka
- Zurivka
- Kalynivka
- Kolonshchyna
- Komarivka
- Kopyliv
- Kopiivka
- Korolivka
- Lypivka
- Lysytsia
- Lozovyk
- Liudvynivka
- Makarivska Buda
- Makovyshche
- Malyi Karashyn
- Marianivka
- Marianivka
- Mykolaivka
- Motyzhyn
- Nalyvaikivka
- Nebelytsia
- Nizhylovychi
- Novomyrivka
- Pashkivka
- Plakhtianka
- Pochepyn
- Rozhiv
- Sadky-Stroivka
- Severynivka
- Sytniaky
- Sobolivka
- Fasivochka
- Fasova
- Ferma
- Chervona Hirka
- Chervona Sloboda
- Shnuriv Lis
- Yuriv

== See also ==
- List of hromadas of Ukraine
