= Kozhanka, Kyiv Oblast =

Rural locality in Kyiv Oblast, Ukraine

Kozhanka Кожанка
- Rural settlement
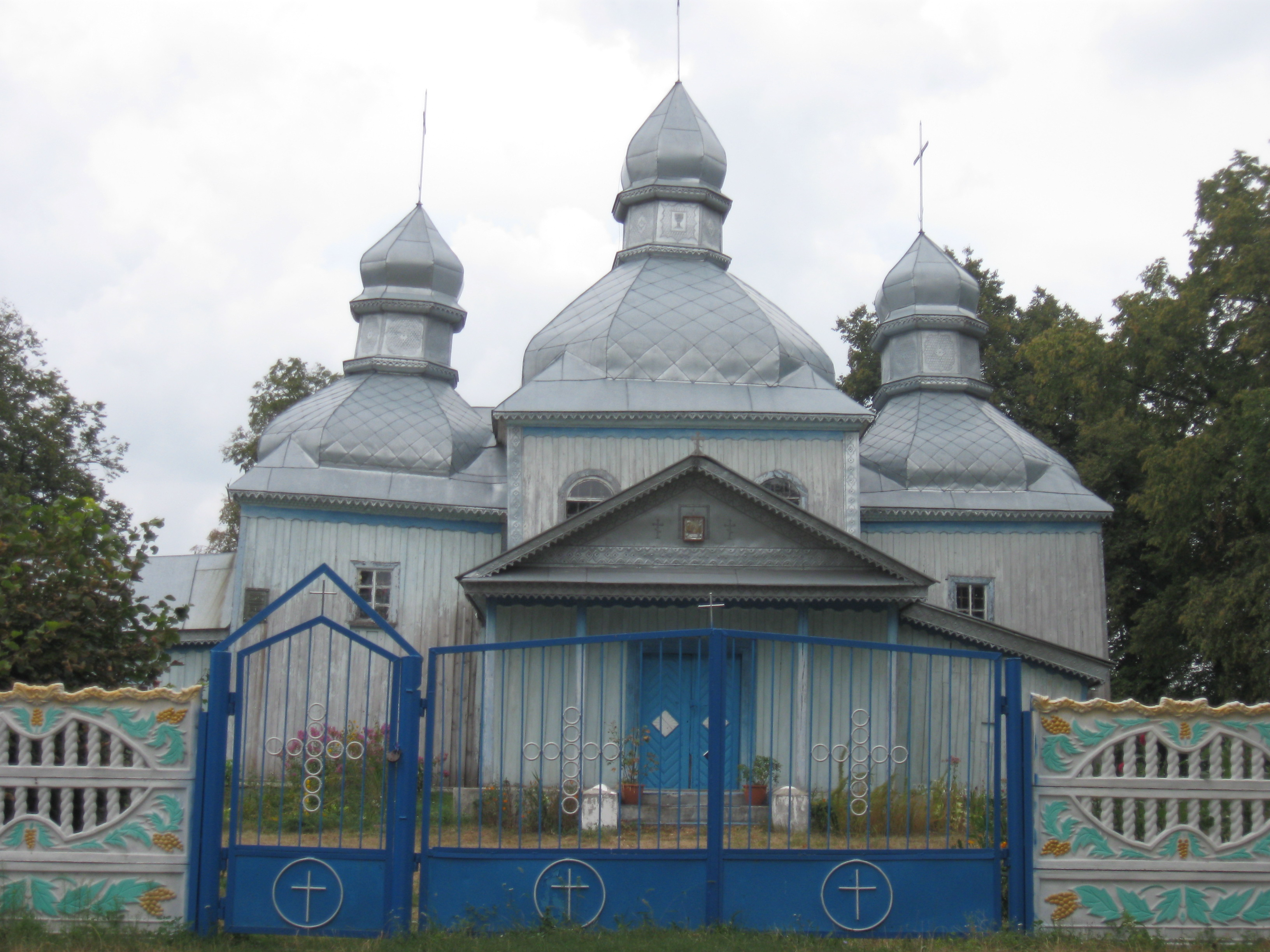
- Pokrov Church

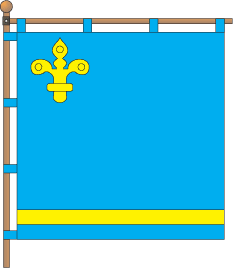
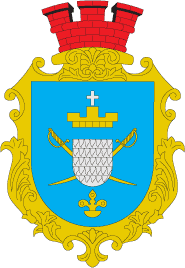
- Flag Coat of arms

- Location of Kozhanka in Ukraine Kozhanka (Ukraine)
- Coordinates: 50°34′57″N 30°00′19″E
- Country: Ukraine
- Oblast: Kyiv Oblast
- District: Fastiv Raion
- Town status: 1972

Population (2022)
  - Total: 1,907
- Time zone: UTC+2 (EET)
  - Summer (DST): UTC+3 (EEST)
- Postal code: 08550
- Area code: +380 4565
- Website: http://rada.gov.ua/

Kozhanka (Ukrainian: Кожанка) is a rural settlement in Fastiv Raion (district) of Kyiv Oblast (province) in northern Ukraine. It hosts the administration of Kozhanka settlement hromada, one of the hromadas of Ukraine. Kozhanka's population was 2,697 as of the 2001 Ukrainian Census. Current population: 1,907 (2022 estimate).

Until 26 January 2024, Kozhanka was designated urban-type settlement. On this day, a new law entered into force which abolished this status, and Kozhanka became a rural settlement.
