= Kozhanka settlement hromada =

Kozhanka settlement hromada Кожанська селищна громада
- Hromada
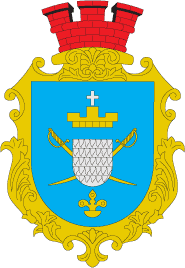
- Seal
- Interactive map of Kozhanka settlement hromada
- Country: Ukraine
- Oblast: Kyiv
- Raion: Fastiv

Area
  - Total: 334.9 km^{2} (129.3 sq mi)

Population (2020)
  - Total: 8,050
  - Density: 24.0/km^{2} (62.3/sq mi)
- Settlements: 15
- Rural settlements: 1
- Villages: 13
- Towns: 1

Kozhanka settlement hromada (Ukrainian: Кожанська селищна громада) is a hromada of Ukraine, located in Fastiv Raion, Kyiv Oblast. Its administrative center is the town of Kozhanka.

It has an area of 334.9 square kilometres (129.3 mi^{2}) and a population of 8,050, as of 2020.

The hromada includes 15 settlements: 1 town (Kozhanka), 13 villages:

- Volytsia
- Dmytrivka
- Yelyzavetivka
- Korolivka
- Malopolovetske
- Pylypivka
- Pivni
- Skryhalivka
- Sofiivka
- Stavky
- Tarasivka
- Trylisy
- Yakhny

And 1 rural-type settlement: Stepove.

== See also ==
- List of hromadas of Ukraine
