= Administrative divisions of Kyiv Oblast =

Kyiv Oblast is subdivided into districts (raions) which are subdivided into territorial communities (hromadas).

== Current ==
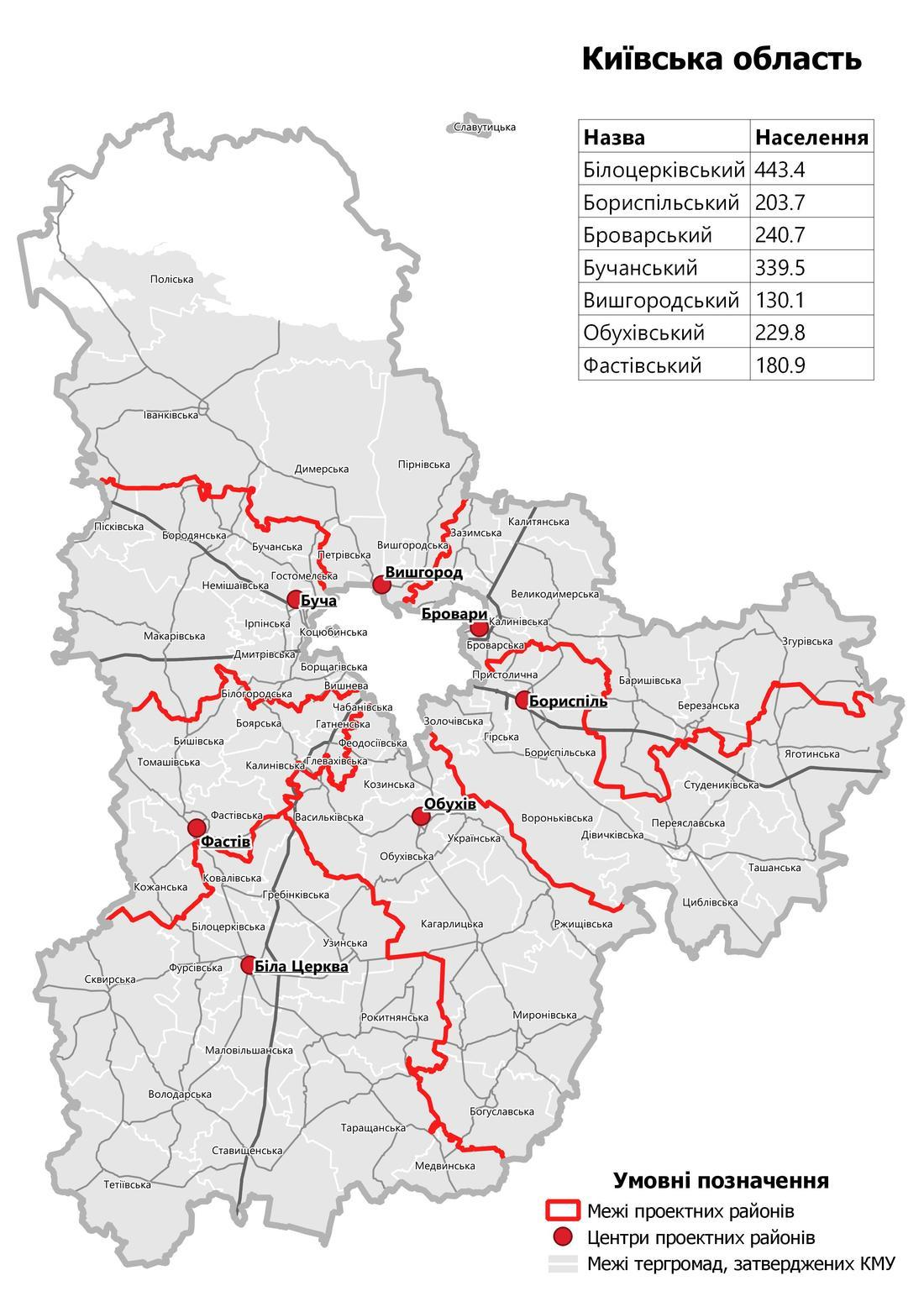
Raions of Kyiv Oblast in August 2020

On 18 July 2020, the number of districts was reduced to seven. These are:

1. Bila Tserkva (Білоцерківський район), the center is in the town of Bila Tserkva;
2. Boryspil (Бориспільський район), the center is in the town of Boryspil;
3. Brovary (Броварський район), the center is in the town of Brovary;
4. Bucha (Бучанський район), the center is in the town of Bucha;
5. Fastiv (Фастівський район), the center is in the town of Fastiv;
6. Obukhiv (Обухівський район), the center is in the town of Obukhiv;
7. Vyshhorod (Вишгородський район), the center is in the town of Vyshhorod.

**Kyiv Oblast**
As of January 1, 2022
Number of districts (райони)	7
Number of hromadas (громади)	69

=== Communities (hromadas) per District (raion) ===
In bold are communities (hromadas) with cities

Bila Tserkva Raion

- **Bila Tserkva**
- Fursy
- Hrebinky
- Kovalivka
- Mala Vilshanka
- Medvyn
- Rokytne
- **Skvyra**
- Stavyshche
- **Tarashcha**
- **Tetiiv**
- **Uzyn**
- Volodarka

Boryspil Raion

- **Boryspil**
- Divychky
- Hora
- **Pereiaslav**
- Prystolychna
- Studenyky
- Tashan
- Tsybli
- Voronkiv
- **Yahotyn**
- Zolochivska

Brovary Raion

- Barashivka
- **Berezan**
- **Brovary**
- Kalynivka
- Kalyta
- Velyka Dymerka
- Zazymya
- Zghurivka

Bucha Raion

- Bilhorodka
- Borodianka
- Borshchahivka
- **Bucha**
- Dmytrivka
- Hostomel
- **Irpin**
- Kotsiubynske
- Makariv
- Nemishayeve
- Piskivka
- **Vyshneve**

Fastiv Raion

- **Boiarka**
- Byshiv
- Chabany
- **Fastiv**
- Hatne
- Hlevakha
- Kalynivka
- Kozhanka
- Tomashivka

Obukhiv Raion

- **Bohuslav**
- Feodosiivska
- **Kaharlyk**
- Kozyn
- **Myronivka**
- **Obukhiv**
- **Rzhyshchiv**
- **Ukrayinka**
- **Vasylkiv**

Vyshhorod Raion

- Dymer
- Ivankiv
- Petrivska
- Pirnove
- Poliske
- **Slavutych**
- **Vyshhorod**

== Administrative divisions until 2020 ==
=== Original composition ===
Kyiv Oblast was created in 1932 and was subdivided into 100 subregions: 98 districts (raions) and 2 city municipalities (mis'krada or misto), officially known as territories governed by city councils. In 1932, the original Kyiv Oblast covered most of northern Ukraine and included territories from Cherkasy Oblast, Chernihiv Oblast, Zhytomyr Oblast, the northern half of Sumy Oblast, and some portions of Kirovohrad Oblast.

- Cities of the oblast's subordination:
  - Kyiv (Київ)
  - Zhytomyr (Житомир)
- Districts (raions, A–M):
  - Andrushivka Raion (Андрушівський район)
  - Bakhmach Raion (Бахмацький район) → Chernihiv Oblast
  - Baranivka Raion (Баранівський район)
  - Barashi Raion (Барашівський район)
  - Baryshivka Raion (Баришівський район)
  - Bazar Raion (Базарський район)
  - Berezna Raion (Березнянський район) → Chernihiv Oblast
  - Bila Tserkva Raion (Білоцерківський район)
  - Bobrovytsia Raion (Бобровицький район) → Chernihiv Oblast
  - Bohuslav Raion (Богуславський район)
  - Borodianka Raion (Бородянський район)
  - Boryspil Raion (Бориспільський район)
  - Borzna Raion (Борознянський район) → Chernihiv Oblast
  - Brusyliv Raion (Брусилівський район)
  - Buky Raion (Буцький район)
  - Cherkasy Raion (Черкаський район)
  - Cherniakhiv Raion (Черняхівський район)
  - Chernihiv Raion (Чернігівський район) → Chernihiv Oblast
  - Chornobai Raion (Чорнобаївський район)
  - Chornobyl Raion (Чорнобильський район)
  - Chyhyryn Raion (Чигиринський район)
  - Dmytrivka Raion (Дмитріївський район) → Chernihiv Oblast
  - Dobrianka Raion (Добрянський район) → Chernihiv Oblast
  - Drabiv Raion (Драбівський район) → Kharkiv Oblast
  - Dymer Raion (Димерський район)
  - Fastiv Raion (Фастівський район)
  - Helmiaziv Raion (Гельмязівський район)
  - Hlukhiv Raion (Глухівський район) → Chernihiv Oblast
  - Horodnia Raion (Городнянський район) → Chernihiv Oblast
  - Horodnytsia Raion (Городницький район)
  - Ichnia Raion (Ічнянський район) → Chernihiv Oblast
  - Ivankiv Raion (Іванківський район)
  - Ivanytsia Raion (Іваницький район) → Chernihiv Oblast
  - Kaharlyk Raion (Кагарлицький район)
  - Kamianka Raion (Кам’янський район)
  - Kaniv Raion (Канівський район)
  - Khabne Raion (Хабнянський район) → Kaganovich Raion in 1935
  - Konotop Raion (Конотопський район) → Chernihiv Oblast
  - Koriukivka Raion (Корюківський район) → Chernihiv Oblast
  - Korop Raion (Коропський район) → Chernihiv Oblast
  - Korosten Raion (Коростенський район)
  - Korostyshiv Raion (Коростишівський район)
  - Korsun Raion (Корсунський район)
  - Kozelets Raion (Козелецький район) → Chernihiv Oblast
  - Krolevets Raion (Кролевецький район) → Chernihiv Oblast
  - Luhyny Raion (Лугинський район)
  - Lysianka Raion (Лисянський район)
  - Makariv Raion (Макарівський район)
  - Mala Divytsia Raion (Малодівицький район) → Chernihiv Oblast
  - Malyn Raion (Малинський район)
  - Markhlevsk Raion, ethnic Polish (Мархліївський район (нац. пол.))
  - Mena Raion (Менський район) → Chernihiv Oblast
- Districts (raions, N–Z):
  - Narodychi Raion (Народицький район)
  - Nizhyn Raion (Ніжинський район) → Chernihiv Oblast
  - Nosivka Raion (Носівський район) → Chernihiv Oblast
  - Novhorod-Siverskyi Raion (Новгород-Сіверський район) → Chernihiv Oblast
  - Novohrad-Volynskyi Raion (Новоград-Волинський район)
  - Obukhiv Raion (Обухівський район)
  - Olevsk Raion (Олевський район)
  - Olyshivka Raion (Олишівський район) → Chernihiv Oblast
  - Oster Raion (Остерський район) → Chernihiv Oblast
  - Ovruch Raion (Овруцький район)
  - Pereiaslav Raion (Переяславський район)
  - Petrovskoho H.I. Raion (Петровського Г.І. район)
  - Ponornytsia Raion (Понорницький район) → Chernihiv Oblast
  - Popilnia Raion (Попільнянський район)
  - Potiivka Raion (Потіївський район)
  - Pulyny Raion, ethnic German (Пулинський район (нац. нім.))
  - Radomysl Raion (Радомисльський район)
  - Ripky Raion (Ріпківський район) → Chernihiv Oblast
  - Rozvazhiv Raion (Розважівський район)
  - Rokytne Raion (Рокитнянський район)
  - Ruzhyn Raion (Ружинський район)
  - Rzhyshchiv Raion (Ржищівський район)
  - Semenivka Raion (Семенівський район) → Chernihiv Oblast
  - Seredyna-Buda Raion (Середино-Будський район) → Chernihiv Oblast
  - Shostka Raion (Шосткинський район) → Chernihiv Oblast
  - Shpola Raion (Шполянський район)
  - Skvyra Raion (Сквирський район)
  - Slovechne Raion (Словечанський район)
  - Smila Raion (Смілянський район)
  - Snovsk Raion (Сновський район) → Chernihiv Oblast
  - Stavyshche Raion (Ставищенський район)
  - Talne Raion (Тальнівський район)
  - Tarashcha Raion (Таращанський район)
  - Tetiiv Raion (Тетіївський район)
  - Troyaniv Raion (Троянівський район)
  - Vasylkiv Raion (Васильківський район)
  - Volodarka Raion (Володарський район)
  - Volodarsk Raion (Володарський район)
  - Vyshcha Dubechnia Raion (Вищедубечанський район)
  - Yahotyn Raion (Яготинський район) → Kharkiv Oblast
  - Yarun Raion (Ярунський район)
  - Yemilchyne Raion (Ємільчинський район)
  - Zhashkiv Raion (Жашківський район)
  - Zlatopil Raion (Златопільський район)
  - Zolotonosha Raion (Золотоніський район)
  - Zvenyhorodka Raion (Звенигородський район)

=== Chernihiv Oblast creation ===
Oblasts of Ukraine in the end of 1932

Later that year, on 15 October 1932, the All-Ukrainian Central Executive Committee adopted the resolution "On the Formation of Chernihiv Oblast". To the newly created Chernihiv Oblast were transferred 29 districts (raions). At the same time, 2 additional districts from Kyiv were transferred to Kharkiv Oblast (today Poltava Oblast). Conversely, Kyiv Oblast received 7 districts from Vinnytsia Oblast. The total number of districts in Kyiv Oblast decreased to 74.

In summer 1934, the republican seat of the Ukrainian SSR was officially transferred from Kharkiv to Kyiv.

=== The 1935 composition ===
In January 1935, the Presidium of the Central Executive Committee of the Ukrainian SSR issued resolutions "On the deconsolidation of districts of the Ukrainian SSR" and "On the Composition of the New Administrative Districts of Kyiv Oblast". The number of districts in Kyiv Oblast increased by 19 to 93, while their size decreased. Many districts that existed before the Kyiv Oblast's creation were reinstated. Some district names' spellings were adjusted in the resolutions and provided in the list below according to the references.

- Cities of the oblast's subordination:
  - Kyiv (Київ)
  - Zhytomyr (Житомир) → Zhytomyr Oblast
- Districts (raions, A–M):
  - Andrushivka Raion (Андрушівський район) → Zhytomyr Oblast
  - Babanka Raion (Бабанський район, Вінницької області) → added
  - Baranivka Raion (Баранівський район) → Zhytomyr Oblast
  - Barashi Raion (Барашівський район) → Zhytomyr Oblast
  - Baryshivka Raion (Баришівський район)
  - Bazar Raion (Базарський район) → Zhytomyr Oblast
  - Berezan Raion (Березанський район) → reinstated
  - Bila Tserkva Raion (Білоцерківський район)
  - Bohuslav Raion (Богуславський район)
  - Borodianka Raion (Бородянський район)
  - Boryspil Raion (Бориспільський район)
  - Brovary Raion (Броварський район) → created in 1937
  - Brusyliv Raion (Брусилівський район) → Zhytomyr Oblast
  - Buky Raion (Буцький район)
  - Byshiv Raion (Бишівський район) → reinstated
  - Cherkasy Raion (Черкаський район)
  - Cherniakhiv Raion (Черняхівський район) → Zhytomyr Oblast
  - Chervonoarmiysk Raion (Червоноармійський район) → renamed, Zhytomyr Oblast
  - Chopovychi Raion (Чоповицький район) → reinstated, Zhytomyr Oblast
  - Chornobai Raion (Чорнобаївський район) → Poltava Oblast
  - Chornobyl Raion (Чорнобильський район)
  - Chyhyryn Raion (Чигиринський район)
  - Dymer Raion (Димерський район)
  - Emilchyne Raion (Емільчинський район) → adjustment, Zhytomyr Oblast
  - Fastiv Raion (Фастівський район)
  - Helmiaziv Raion (Гельмязівський район) → Poltava Oblast
  - Horodnytsia Raion (Городницький район) → Zhytomyr Oblast
  - Hrebinka Raion (Гребінківський район) → reinstated
  - im. H.I. Petrovskoho Raion (ім. Г.І. Петровського район) → adjustment
  - Irkliiv Raion (Іркліївський район) → reinstated, Poltava Oblast
  - Ivankiv Raion (Іванківський район)
  - Kaharlyk Raion (Кагарлицький район)
  - Kamianka Raion (Кам’янський район)
  - Kaniv Raion (Канівський район)
  - Katerynopil Raion (Катеринопольський район) → reinstated, adjusted
  - Kahanovychi Raion (Кагановицький район) → renamed
  - Khrystynivka Raion (Христинівський район, Вінницької області) → added
  - Kornyn Raion (Корнинський район) → reinstated, Zhytomyr Oblast
  - Korosten Raion (Коростенський район) → Zhytomyr Oblast
  - Korostyshiv Raion (Коростишівський район) → Zhytomyr Oblast
  - Korsun Raion (Корсунський район)
  - Kyiv (Svyatoshyno) Raion (Київський (Святошинський) район) → created in 1937
  - Ladyzhynka Raion (Ладижинський район) → reinstated
  - Luhyny Raion (Лугинський район) → Zhytomyr Oblast
  - Lysianka Raion (Лисянський район)
  - Makariv Raion (Макарівський район)
  - Malyn Raion (Малинський район) → Zhytomyr Oblast
  - Mankivka Raion (Маньківський район) → reinstated
  - Markhlevsk Raion (Мархлевський район) → abolished
  - Mokra-Kalyhirka Raion (Мокро-Калигірський район) → reinstated
  - Manastyryshcha Raion (Манастирищанський район, Вінницької області) → adjusted, returned
  - Myronivka Raion (Миронівський район) → reinstated
- Districts (raions, N–Z):
  - Narodychi Raion (Народицький район) → Zhytomyr Oblast
  - Novohrad-Volynskyi Raion (Новоград-Волинський район) → Zhytomyr Oblast
  - Novo-Shepelychi Raion (Ново-Шепелицький район) → reinstated
  - Obukhiv Raion (Обухівський район)
  - Oleksandriia Raion (Олександрійський район) → reinstated (with error due to proximity)
  - Olevsk Raion (Олевський район) → Zhytomyr Oblast
  - Orativ Raion (Оратівський район, Вінницької області) → returned
  - Ovruch Raion (Овруцький район) → Zhytomyr Oblast
  - Pereiaslav Raion (Переяславський район)
  - Pidvysoke Raion (Підвисоцький район) → reinstated
  - Plyskiv Raion (Плисківський район, Вінницької області) → returned
  - Pohrebyshche Raion (Погребищенський район, Вінницької області) → returned
  - Popilnia Raion (Попільнянський район) → Zhytomyr Oblast
  - Potiivka Raion (Потіївський район) → Zhytomyr Oblast
  - Radomysl Raion (Радомисльський район) → Zhytomyr Oblast
  - Rozvazhiv Raion (Розважівський район)
  - Rokytne Raion (Рокитнянський район)
  - Rotmystrivka Raion (Ротмистрівський район) → new, adjusted
  - Ruzhyn Raion (Ружинський район) → Zhytomyr Oblast
  - Rzhyshchiv Raion (Ржищівський район)
  - Shpola Raion (Шполянський район)
  - Skvyra Raion (Сквирський район)
  - Slavechne Raion (Славечанський район) → adjustment, Zhytomyr Oblast
  - Smila Raion (Смілянський район)
  - Stavyshche Raion (Ставищенський район)
  - Talne Raion (Тальнівський район)
  - Tarashcha Raion (Таращанський район)
  - Tetiiv Raion (Тетіївський район)
  - Troyaniv Raion (Троянівський район) → Zhytomyr Oblast
  - Uman Raion (Уманський район, Вінницької області) → added
  - Uzyn Raion (Узинський район) → reinstated
  - Vasylkiv Raion (Васильківський район)
  - Velyko-Polovetske Raion (Велико-Половецький район) → reinstated, adjusted
  - Vchoraisha Raion (Вчорайшанський район) → reinstated, adjusted, Zhytomyr Oblast
  - Vilshana Raion (Вільшанський район) → reinstated
  - Volodarka Raion (Володарський район)
  - Volodarsko-Volynsk Raion (Володарсько-Волинський район) → renamed, Zhytomyr Oblast
  - Vyshche-Dubechnia Raion (Вище-Дубечнянський район) → adjustment
  - Yarun Raion (Ярунський район) → Zhytomyr Oblast
  - Zhashkiv Raion (Жашківський район)
  - Zlatopil Raion (Златопільський район)
  - Zolotonosha Raion (Золотоніський район) → Poltava Oblast
  - Zvenyhorodka Raion (Звенигородський район)

=== Creation of Zhytomyr Oblast and Kirovohrad Oblast ===
On May 4, 1935, the Central Executive Committee of the Ukrainian SSR issued a resolution "On the Creation of Districts within the Territory of the Kyiv and Vinnytsia Oblasts." Along the Polish border, in Kyiv Oblast were created 2 border okrugs: Korosten (districts: Barashi, Yemilchyne, Korosten, Luhyny, Narodychi, Ovruch, Olevsk, Slovechne, and Chopovychi) and Novohrad-Volynskyi (districts: Baranivka, Horodnytsia, Markhlevsk, Novohrad-Volynskyi, Pulyny, Yarun).

On 29 April 1936, in the Kyiv Oblast was established the Zhytomyr Okrug, in addition to the two existing okrugs and which included the city of Zhytomyr and 6 districts (Troyaniv, Korostyshiv, Radomyshl, Cherniakhiv, Volodarsk-Volynskyi, and Potiiv).

On September 22, 1937, by the resolution of the Central Executive Committee of the USSR "On the division of Kharkiv Oblast into Kharkiv Oblast and Poltava Oblast, Kyiv Oblast into Kyiv Oblast and Zhytomyr Oblast, Vinnytsia Oblast into Vinnytsia Oblast and Kamianets-Podilsk Oblast, and Odesa Oblast into Odesa Oblast and Mykolaiv Oblast," the border okrugs were abolished. To the newly formed Zhytomyr Oblast were transferred the Zhytomyr municipality and 28 raions, including the 21 raions in all three border okrugs of Kyiv Oblast plus an additional 7 raions. As of September 22, 1937, the Kyiv Oblast comprised 58 districts and the city of Kyiv as one urban settlement that was not part of any district and the republican center.

- Cities of the oblast's subordination:
  - Kyiv (Київ)
- Districts (raions, B–L):
  - Babanka Raion (Бабанський район) → Cherkasy Oblast
  - Baryshivka Raion (Баришівський район)
  - Berezan Raion (Березанський район)
  - Bila Tserkva Raion (Білоцерківський район)
  - Bohuslav Raion (Богуславський район)
  - Borodianka Raion (Бородянський район)
  - Boryspil Raion (Бориспільський район)
  - Brovary Raion (Броварський район)
  - Buky Raion (Буцький район) → Cherkasy Oblast
  - Byshiv Raion (Бишівський район)
  - Cherkasy Raion (Черкаський район) → Cherkasy Oblast
  - Chornobyl Raion (Чорнобильський район)
  - Chyhyryn Raion (Чигиринський район) → Kirovohrad Oblast
  - Dymer Raion (Димерський район)
  - Fastiv Raion (Фастівський район)
  - Horodyshche Raion (Городищенський район) → Cherkasy Oblast
  - Hrebinka Raion (Гребінківський район)
  - Ivankiv Raion (Іванківський район)
  - Kaharlyk Raion (Кагарлицький район)
  - Kamianka Raion (Кам’янський район) → Kirovohrad Oblast
  - Kaniv Raion (Канівський район) → Cherkasy Oblast
  - Katerynopil Raion (Катеринопольський район) → Cherkasy Oblast
  - Khrystynivka Raion (Христинівський район) → Cherkasy Oblast
  - Korsun-Shevchenkivskyi Raion (Корсунський-Шевченківський район) → Cherkasy Oblast
  - Kyievo-Svyatoshynskyi Raion (Києво-Святошинський район)
  - Ladyzhynka Raion (Ладижинський район) → Cherkasy Oblast
  - Lysianka Raion (Лисянський район) → Cherkasy Oblast
- Districts (raions, M–Z):
  - Makariv Raion (Макарівський район)
  - Mankivka Raion (Маньківський район) → Cherkasy Oblast
  - Mokra-Kalyhirka Raion (Мокро-Калигірський район) → Cherkasy Oblast
  - Myronivka Raion (Миронівський район)
  - Novo-Shepelychi Raion (Ново-Шепелицький район)
  - Obukhiv Raion (Обухівський район)
  - Oleksandrivka Raion (Олександрівський район) → Kirovohrad Oblast
  - Pereiaslav-Khmelnytskyi Raion (Переяслав-Хмельницький район)
  - Pidvysoke Raion (Підвисоцький район) → Kirovohrad Oblast
  - Poliske Raion (Поліський район) → renamed in 1957
  - Rokytne Raion (Рокитнянський район)
  - Rotmystrivka Raion (Ротмистрівський район) → Cherkasy Oblast
  - Rozvazhiv Raion (Розважівський район)
  - Rzhyshchiv Raion (Ржищівський район)
  - Shpola Raion (Шполянський район) → Cherkasy Oblast
  - Skvyra Raion (Сквирський район)
  - Smila Raion (Смілянський район) → Cherkasy Oblast
  - Stavyshche Raion (Ставищенський район)
  - Talne Raion (Тальнівський район) → Cherkasy Oblast
  - Tarashcha Raion (Таращанський район)
  - Tetiiv Raion (Тетіївський район)
  - Uman Raion (Уманський район) → Cherkasy Oblast
  - Uzyn Raion (Узинський район)
  - Vasylkiv Raion (Васильківський район)
  - Velyko-Polovetske Raion (Велико-Половецький район)
  - Vilshana Raion (Вільшанський район) → Cherkasy Oblast
  - Volodarka Raion (Володарський район)
  - Vyshche-Dubechnia Raion (Вище-Дубечнянський район)
  - Yahotyn Raion (Яготинський район, Полтавської області) → added
  - Zghurivka Raion (Згурівський район, Полтавської області) → added
  - Zhashkiv Raion (Жашківський район) → Cherkasy Oblast
  - Zlatopil Raion (Златопільський район) → Kirovohrad Oblast
  - Zvenyhorodka Raion (Звенигородський район) → Cherkasy Oblast

On January 10, 1939, a Decree of the Presidium of the Supreme Soviet of the USSR was issued, titled "On the Formation of Sumy, Kirovohrad, and Zaporizhzhia Oblasts within the Ukrainian SSR". Under this Decree, 5 districts of Kyiv Oblast were included in Kirovohrad Oblast.

On March 11, 1944, a Decree of the Presidium of the Supreme Soviet of the Ukrainian SSR was issued: “On the Renaming of the Pereiaslav Raion of the Kyiv Oblast to the Pereiaslav-Khmelnytskyi Raion”. On May 3, 1944, a Decree of the Presidium of the Supreme Soviet of the Ukrainian SSR was issued: "On the Renaming of the Korsun Raion of the Kyiv Oblast to the Korsun-Shevchenkivskyi Raion". On August 15, 1944, a Decree of the Presidium of the Supreme Soviet of the Ukrainian SSR was issued, titled "On the Renaming, Clarification, and Amendment of the Names of Certain Cities, District Centers, and Districts of the Ukrainian SSR", according to which:

- The Kyiv (Svyatoshyno) Raion was renamed the Kyievo-Sviatoshynskyi Raion;
- The settlement imeni H. I. Petrovskyi, the district center of the Raion imeni H. I. Petrovskyi, was renamed the settlement of Horodyshche;
- The Raion imeni H. I. Petrovskyi was renamed the Horodyshche Raion.

On August 2, 1948, a Decree of the Presidium of the Supreme Soviet of the Ukrainian SSR was issued, titled "On Perpetuating the Memory of the Deputy Chairman of the Council of Ministers of the Ukrainian SSR, V. F. Starchenko", in accordance with which the Myronivka Raion of the Kyiv Oblast was renamed the Starchenko Raion.

=== Creation of Cherkasy Oblast ===
On 6 January 1954, a Decree of the Presidium of the Supreme Soviet of the Ukrainian SSR was issued, "On the Inclusion of the Zhurivka and Yahotyn Raions of Poltava Oblast into the Composition of Kyiv Oblast". On 7 January 1954, a Decree of the Presidium of the Supreme Soviet of the USSR was issued, titled “On the Formation of Cherkasy Oblast within the Ukrainian SSR”. Following the transfer of 20 districts from the Kyiv region to the Cherkasy region, 35 districts remained within the Kyiv region as of 7 January 1954.

On November 1, 1957, by a decree of the Presidium of the Supreme Soviet of the Ukrainian SSR, the Kahanovychi Raion of the Kyiv Oblast was renamed the Poliske Raion, and its district center, the urban-type settlement of Kahanovychi Pershi, was renamed the urban-type settlement of Poliske.

- Cities of the oblast's subordination:
  - Kyiv (Київ)
- Districts (raions, B–N):
  - Baryshivka Raion (Баришівський район)
  - Berezan Raion (Березанський район)
  - Bila Tserkva Raion (Білоцерківський район)
  - Bohuslav Raion (Богуславський район)
  - Borodianka Raion (Бородянський район)
  - Boryspil Raion (Бориспільський район)
  - Brovary Raion (Броварський район)
  - Byshiv Raion (Бишівський район)
  - Chornobyl Raion (Чорнобильський район)
  - Dymer Raion (Димерський район)
  - Fastiv Raion (Фастівський район)
  - Hrebinka Raion (Гребінківський район)
  - Ivankiv Raion (Іванківський район)
  - Kaharlyk Raion (Кагарлицький район)
  - Kyievo-Svyatoshynskyi Raion (Києво-Святошинський район)
  - Makariv Raion (Макарівський район)
  - Myronivka Raion (Миронівський район)
  - Novo-Shepelychi Raion (Ново-Шепелицький район)
- Districts (raions, O–Z):
  - Obukhiv Raion (Обухівський район)
  - Pereiaslav-Khmelnytskyi Raion (Переяслав-Хмельницький район)
  - Poliske Raion (Поліський район)
  - Rokytne Raion (Рокитнянський район)
  - Rozvazhiv Raion (Розважівський район)
  - Rzhyshchiv Raion (Ржищівський район)
  - Skvyra Raion (Сквирський район)
  - Stavyshche Raion (Ставищенський район)
  - Tarashcha Raion (Таращанський район)
  - Tetiiv Raion (Тетіївський район)
  - Uzyn Raion (Узинський район)
  - Vasylkiv Raion (Васильківський район)
  - Velyko-Polovetske Raion (Велико-Половецький район)
  - Volodarka Raion (Володарський район)
  - Vyshche-Dubechnia Raion (Вище-Дубечнянський район)
  - Yahotyn Raion (Яготинський район)
  - Zghurivka Raion (Згурівський район)

=== Later composition ===
Raions of Kyiv Oblast (prior to the 2020 reform)

Before July 2020, Kyiv Oblast was subdivided into 38 regions: 25 districts (raions) and 13 city municipalities (mis'krada or misto), officially known as territories governed by city councils.

- Cities under the oblast's jurisdiction:
  - Berezan (Березань)
  - Bila Tserkva (Біла Церква)
  - Boryspil (Бориспіль)
  - Brovary (Бровари)
  - Bucha (Буча)
  - Fastiv (Фастів)
  - Irpin Municipality
    - Cities and towns under the city's jurisdiction:
      - Irpin (Ірпінь)
    - Urban-type settlements under the district's jurisdiction:
      - Hostomel (Гостомель)
      - Kotsiubynske (Коцюбинське)
      - Vorzel (Ворзель)
  - Obukhiv Municipality
    - Cities and towns under the city's jurisdiction:
      - Obukhiv (Обухів)
  - Pereiaslav (Переяслав), formerly Pereiaslav-Khmelnytskyi
  - Pripyat (Прип'ять)
  - Rzhyshchiv (Ржищів)
  - Slavutych (Славутич)
  - Vasylkiv (Васильків)
- Districts (raions):
  - Baryshivka (Баришівський район)
    - Urban-type settlements under the district's jurisdiction:
      - Baryshivka (Баришівка)
  - Bila Tserkva (Білоцерківський район)
    - Cities and towns under the district's jurisdiction:
      - Uzyn (Узин)
    - Urban-type settlements under the district's jurisdiction:
      - Terezyne (Терезине)
  - Bohuslav (Богуславський район)
    - Cities and towns under the district's jurisdiction:
      - Bohuslav (Богуслав)
  - Borodianka (Бородянський район)
    - Urban-type settlements under the district's jurisdiction:
      - Babyntsi (Бабинці)
      - Borodianka (Бородянка)
      - Klavdiievo-Tarasove (Клавдієво-Тарасове)
      - Nemishaieve (Немішаєве)
      - Piskivka (Пісківка)
  - Boryspil (Бориспільський район)
  - Brovary (Броварський район)
    - Urban-type settlements under the district's jurisdiction:
      - Kalynivka (Калинівка)
      - Kalyta (Калита)
      - Velyka Dymerka (Велика Димерка)
  - Fastiv (Фастівський район)
    - Urban-type settlements under the district's jurisdiction:
      - Borova (Борова)
      - Kozhanka (Кожанка)
  - Ivankiv (Іванківський район)
    - Cities and towns under the district's jurisdiction:
      - Chernobyl (Чорнобиль)
    - Urban-type settlements under the district's jurisdiction:
      - Ivankiv (Іванків)
  - Kaharlyk (Кагарлицький район)
    - Cities and towns under the district's jurisdiction:
      - Kaharlyk (Кагарлик)
  - Kyiv-Sviatoshyn (Києво-Святошинський район)
    - Cities and towns under the district's jurisdiction:
      - Boiarka (Боярка)
      - Vyshneve (Вишневе)
    - Urban-type settlements under the district's jurisdiction:
      - Chabany (Чабани)
  - Makariv (Макарівський район)
    - Urban-type settlements under the district's jurisdiction:
      - Kodra (Кодра)
      - Makariv (Макарів)
  - Myronivka (Миронівський район)
    - Cities and towns under the district's jurisdiction:
      - Myronivka (Миронівка)
  - Obukhiv (Обухівський район)
    - Cities and towns under the district's jurisdiction:
      - Ukrainka (Українка)
    - Urban-type settlements under the district's jurisdiction:
      - Kozyn (Козин)
  - Pereiaslav-Khmelnytskyi (Переяслав-Хмельницький район)
  - Poliske (Поліський район)
    - Urban-type settlements under the district's jurisdiction:
      - Krasiatychi (Красятичі)
  - Rokytne (Рокитнянський район)
    - Urban-type settlements under the district's jurisdiction:
      - Rokytne (Рокитне)
  - Skvyra (Сквирський район)
    - Cities and towns under the district's jurisdiction:
      - Skvyra (Сквира)
  - Stavyshche (Ставищенський район)
    - Urban-type settlements under the district's jurisdiction:
      - Stavyshche (Ставище)
  - Tarashcha (Таращанський район)
    - Cities and towns under the district's jurisdiction:
      - Tarashcha (Тараща)
  - Tetiiv (Тетіївський район)
    - Cities and towns under the district's jurisdiction:
      - Tetiiv (Тетіїв)
  - Vasylkiv (Васильківський район)
    - Urban-type settlements under the district's jurisdiction:
      - Doslidnytske (Дослідницьке)
      - Hlevakha (Глеваха)
      - Hrebinky (Гребінки)
      - Kalynivka (Калинівка)
  - Volodarka (Володарський район)
    - Urban-type settlements under the district's jurisdiction:
      - Volodarka (Володарка)
  - Vyshhorod (Вишгородський район)
    - Cities and towns under the district's jurisdiction:
      - Vyshhorod (Вишгород)
    - Urban-type settlements under the district's jurisdiction:
      - Dymer (Димер)
  - Yahotyn (Яготинський район)
    - Cities and towns under the district's jurisdiction:
      - Yahotyn (Яготин)
  - Zghurivka (Згурівський район)
    - Urban-type settlements under the district's jurisdiction:
      - Zghurivka (Згурівка)
