= Pohrebyshche Raion =

Former subdivision of Vinnytsia Oblast, Ukraine

Pohrebyshche Raion Погребищенський район
- Raion
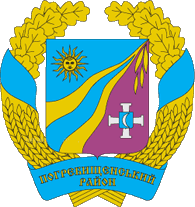
- Flag Coat of arms

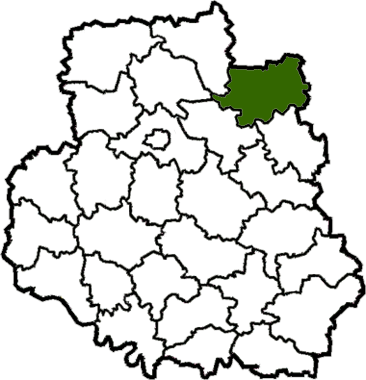
- Coordinates: 49°30′N 29°15′E
- Country: Ukraine
- Oblast: Vinnytsia Oblast
- Established: 1923
- Disestablished: 18 July 2020
- Admin. center: Pohrebyshche
- Subdivisions: List: — city councils; — settlement councils; — rural councils; Number of localities: — cities; — urban-type settlements; 57 — villages; — rural settlements

Government
  - Governor: Vasyl Pavlovych Osadchuk

Area
  - Total: 1,200 km^{2} (460 sq mi)

Population (2020)
  - Total: 28,321
  - Density: 24/km^{2} (61/sq mi)
- Time zone: UTC+02:00 (EET)
  - Summer (DST): UTC+03:00 (EEST)
- Postal index: 22200—22271
- Area code: 380-4346
- Website: Pohrebyschenskyi Raion

Pohrebyshche Raion (Ukrainian: Погребищенський район, romanized: Pohrebyščens'kyj rajon) was a raion (district) of Vinnytsia Oblast in west-central Ukraine. The administrative center of the district was the town of Pohrebyshche. The raion was abolished and its territory was merged into Vinnytsia Raion on 18 July 2020 as part of the administrative reform of Ukraine, which reduced the number of raions of Vinnytsia Oblast to six. The last estimate of the raion population was 28,321 (2020 est.).

== Geography ==
Pohrebyshche Raion was situated on the Podillian forest-steppe area in the north-eastern part of Vinnytsia Oblast. To the north it bordered Zhytomyr Oblast (Ruzhyn Raion) and to the east Kyiv Oblast (Skvyra Raion, Volodarka Raion, Tetiiv Raion). The Ros River finds its source in the village of Ordyntsi, formerly in Pohrebyshche Raion.

== History ==
Pohrebyshche Raion was formed on March 7, 1923 as a part of Kiev Governorate, but on February 27, 1932, it was included in the newly formed Vinnytsia Oblast. Although the area of the raion has changed over the years. The biggest change was in 1963, when Plyskiv Raion was dissolved.

== Subdivisions ==
There were one urban-type settlement, 57 villages, and five minor settlements in the Pohrebyshche Raion. There were one city council and 26 village councils.

=== Town ===
- Pohrebyshche (Погребище)

=== Villages ===
- Adamivka (Адамівка)
- Andrushivka (Андрушівка)
- Babyntsi (Бабинці)
- Barvinkove (Барвінкове)
- Bilashky (Білашки)
- Bistryk (Бистрик)
- Bohatyr (Богатир)
- Borshchahivka (Борщагівка)
- Bukhny (Бухни)
- Bulai (Булаї)
- Burkivtsi (Бурківці)
- Chapaievka (Чапаєвка)
- Cheremoshne (Черемошне)
- Dovhalivka (Довгалівка)
- Dovzhok (Довжок)
- Dziunkiv (Дзюньків)
- Hopchytsia (Гопчиця)
- Ivanky (Іваньки)
- Krupoderyntsi (Круподеринці)
- Kuleshiv (Кулешів)
- Kuriantsi (Кур'янці)
- Levkivka (Левківка)
- Lishchyntsi (Ліщинці)
- Malynky (Малинки)
- Monchyn (Мончин)
- Morozivka (Морозівка)
- Novofastiv (Новофастів)
- Obozivka (Обозівка)
- Ocheretnia (Очеретня)
- Ordyntsi (Ординці)
- Ozerna (Озерна)
- Pariivka (Паріївка)
- Pavlivka (Павлівка)
- Pedosy (Педоси)
- Plyskiv (Плисків)
- Rozkopane (Розкопане)
- Sarazhyntsi (Саражинці)
- Shyrmivka (Ширмівка)
- Skybyntsi (Скибинці)
- Smarzhyntsi (Смаржинці)
- Snizhna (Сніжна)
- Sopyn (Сопин)
- Sosnivka (Соснівка)
- Spychyntsi (Спичинці)
- Stanylivka (Станилівка)
- Starostyntsi (Старостинці)
- Stepanky (Степанки)
- Svytyntsi (Свитинці)
- Talalai (Талалаї)
- Travneve (Травневе)
- Vasylkivtsi (Васильківці)
- Veselivka (Веселівка)
- Vyshnivka, Vinnytsia Raion (Вишнівка)
- Yunashky (Юнашки)
- Zadorozhnie (Задорожнє)
- Zbarzhivka (Збаржівка)
- Zhovtneve (Жовтневе)

== Famous people from Pohrebyshche Raion ==
- Mykhailo Melnyk (1944, Ordyntsi – 1979), Ukrainian historian, poet and dissident
- Valentyn Rechmedin, writer, journalist
- Marko Sokolovsky, virtuoso guitarist
- Mykhailo Telezhynskyi, a member of the Ukrainian Central Rada
- Vsevolod Kolomatskyi, architect, and church figure of Transcarpathia
- Vasyl Kychak, scientist in the field of radio electronics

== See also ==
- Administrative divisions of Vinnytsia Oblast
