= Volyn Deposit =

Deposit of unique minerals in Ukraine

The Volyn Deposit is a unique occurrence of chamber pegmatites located in Zhytomyr Oblast, Ukraine, near the urban-type settlement of Khoroshiv (formerly Volodarsk-Volynskyi). It forms part of the Northwestern Megablock of the Ukrainian Shield and is renowned as one of the world's most significant sources of gemstones and rare minerals. The deposit formed approximately 2 billion years ago through pegmatization processes, resulting in the creation of large, high-purity crystals.

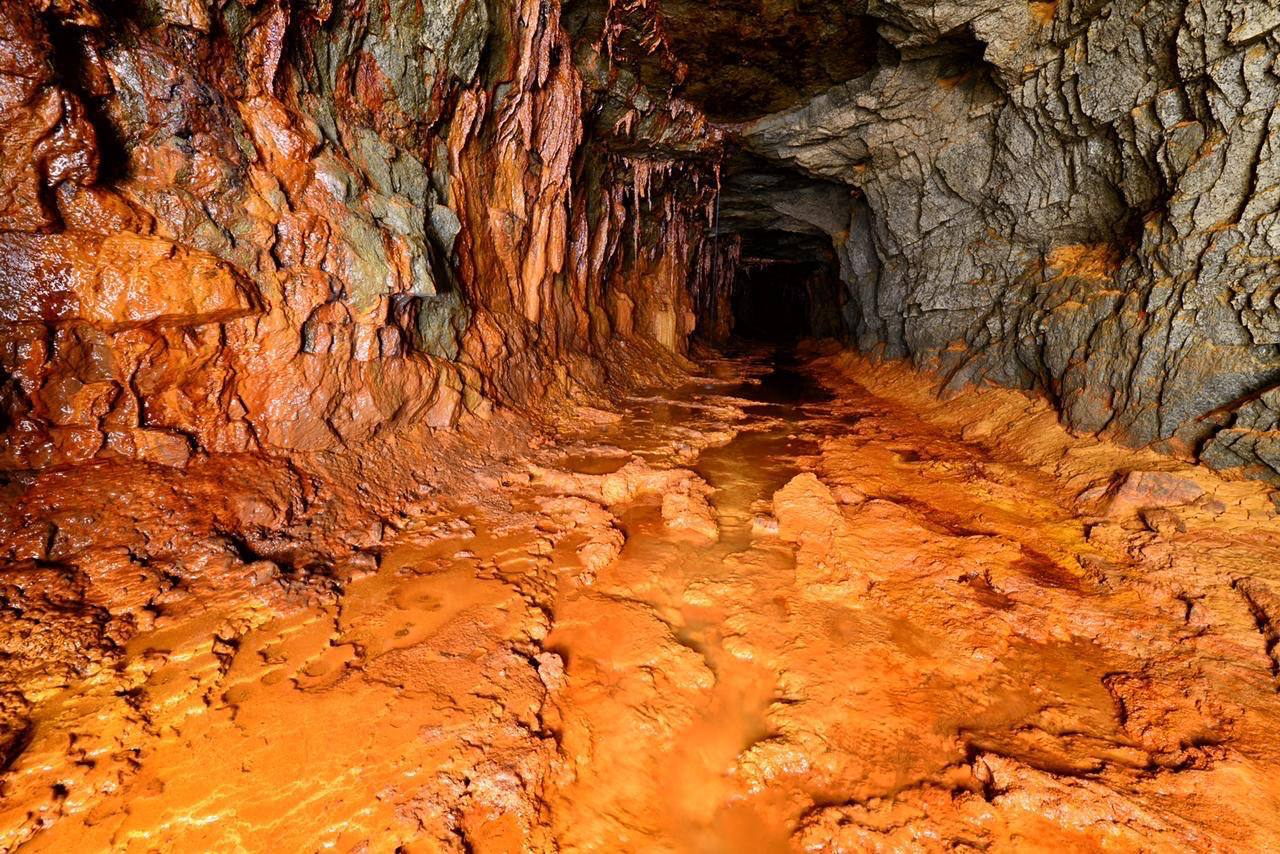
Volyn deposit geological structure

== Geological structure ==
The Volyn Deposit is associated with the Korosten Intrusive Complex, where rocks of the gabbro-anorthosite formation and rapakivi-like granites of Early Proterozoic age form a pluton measuring 150 by 100 km. Pegmatites developed in fractures and cavities within the granites during the slow cooling of magma enriched with rare elements. These processes occurred at the boundary of the Paleoproterozoic, a period when Earth's atmosphere was becoming oxygen-rich and life existed in simple forms. The formations are over 2 billion years old and are part of the Ukrainian Crystalline Shield, one of the oldest geological structures in Europe.

=== Pegmatites ===
The pegmatites of the Volyn Deposit extend in a belt approximately 22 km long and exhibit a complex structure with chamber formations—natural "caverns" that provided space for mineral growth. Approximately 100 minerals have been identified in the pegmatites and associated granites, categorized into major minerals (quartz, feldspars, plagioclase, and micas, comprising over 90% of the volume) and those of moderate abundance (topaz, beryl, opal, chalcedony, kaolinite, fluorite, siderite, hydromicas, and chlorite). The pegmatites serve as a natural laboratory for crystal formation, where slow cooling processes created conditions for the development of exceptionally large crystal forms.

The Volyn Deposit is the only known location in the world where giant beryl crystals are mined from chamber pegmatites, a geological formation nearly unique to this site. The minerals are distinguished by their exceptional purity, size, and natural colors, often requiring no additional processing. The deposit serves as a critical source of piezoquartz for radio engineering and other industries, as well as strategic materials for advanced technologies. Specimens from the deposit are housed in museums in the United States, Germany, Lebanon, and Luxembourg.

== Minerals ==
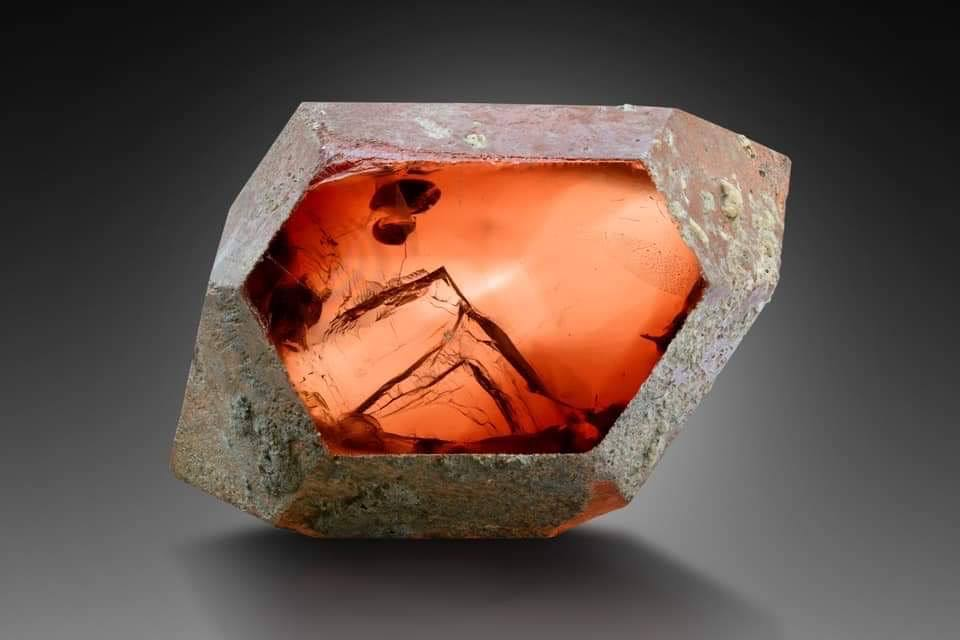
Topaz from the Volyn deposit

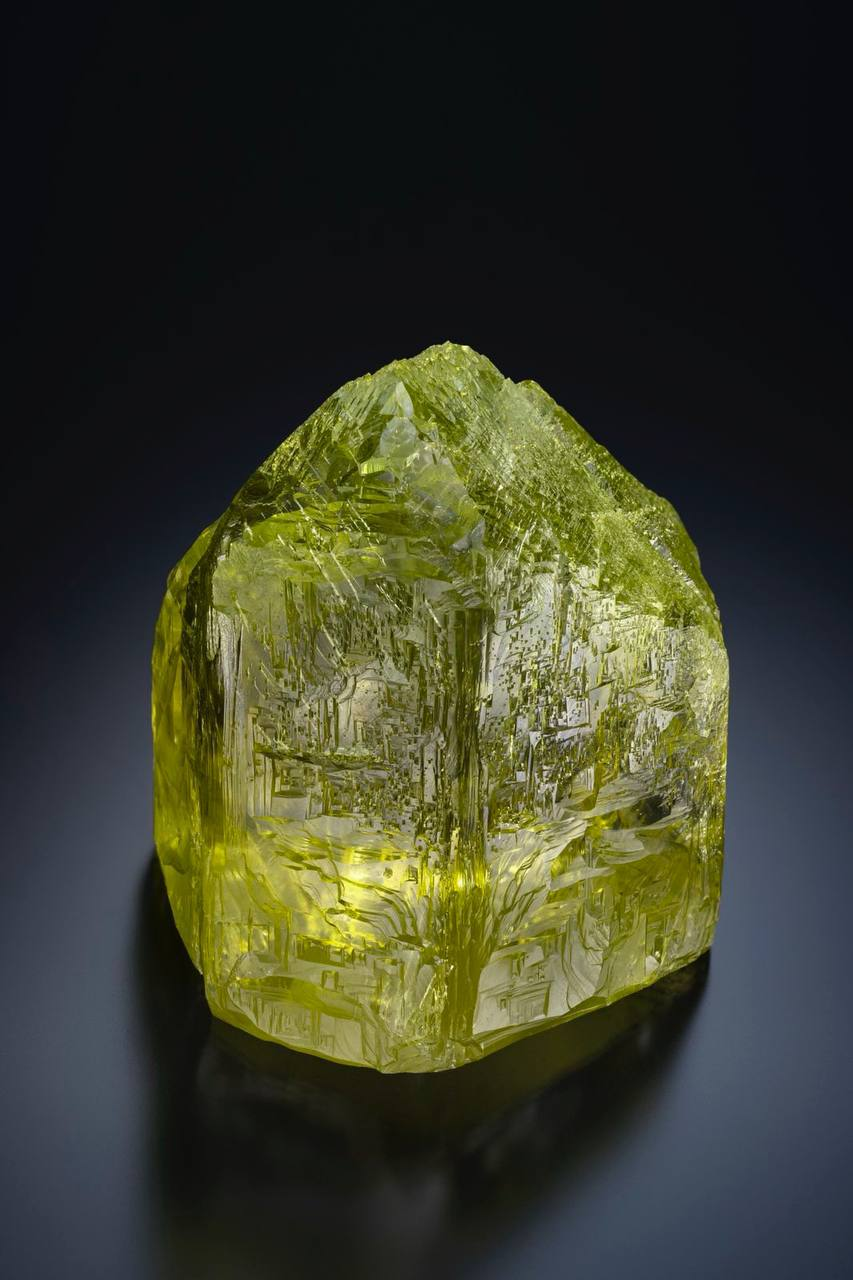
Beryl mined from the Volyn deposit

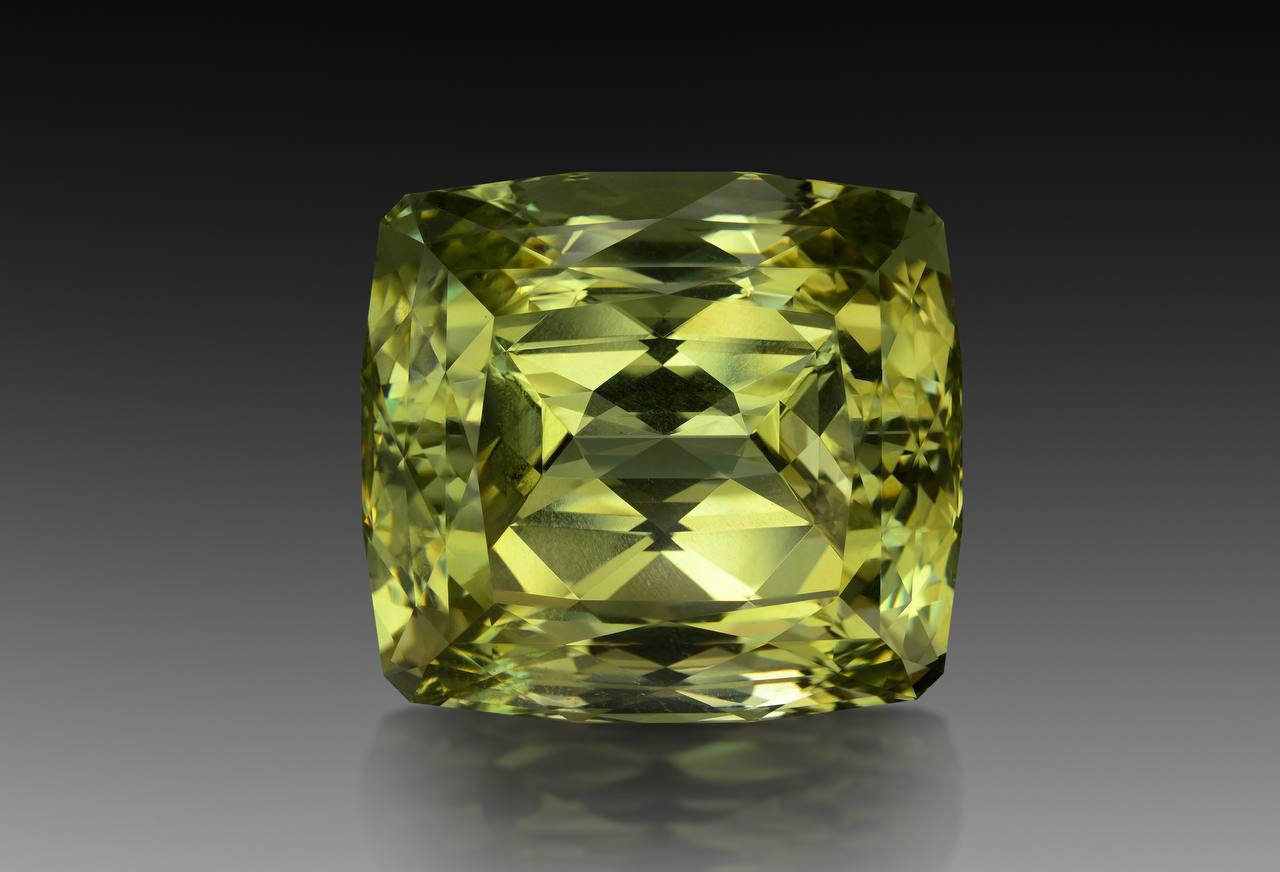
Faceted beryl from the Volyn deposit

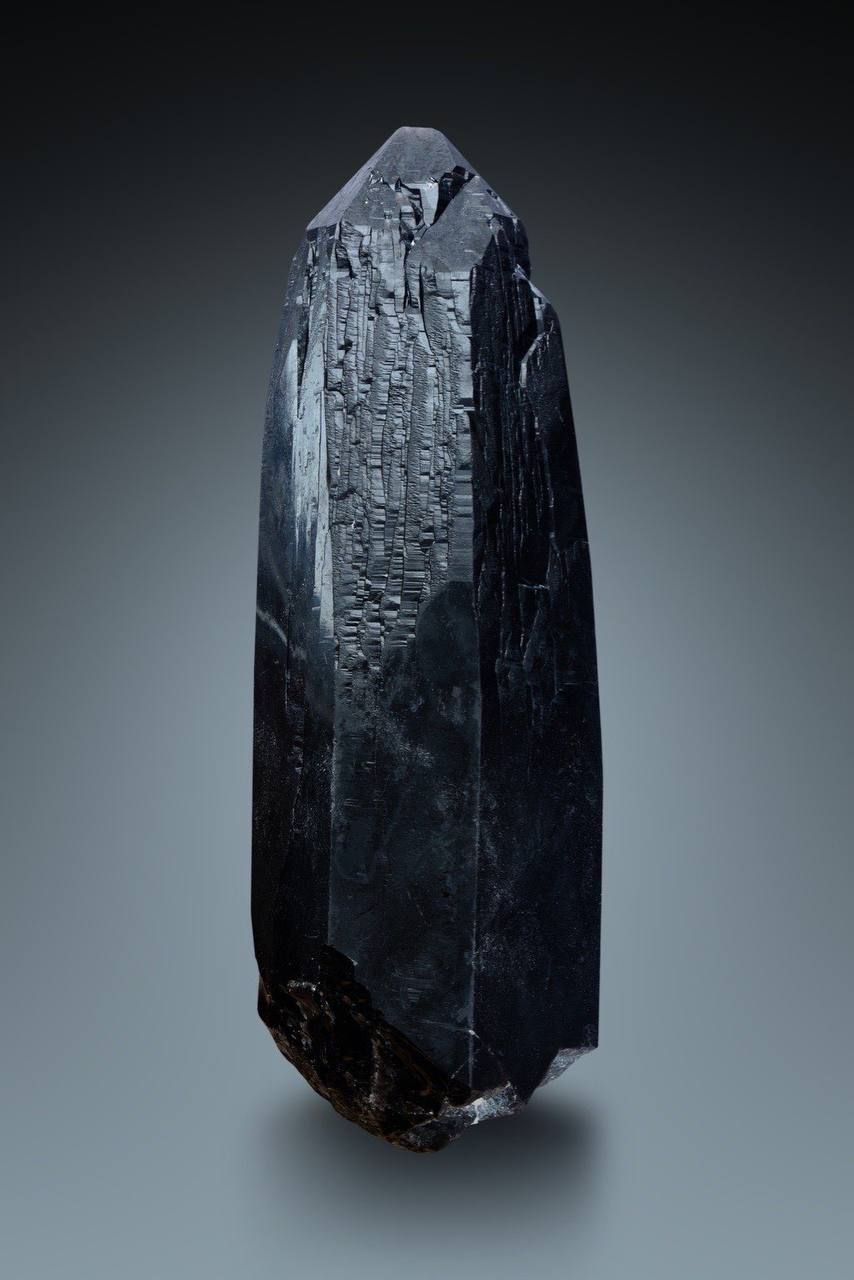
Quartz mined in the depths of the Volyn deposit

The deposit is rich in rare minerals of gemological, collectible, and industrial value. Notable among them are beryl (including heliodor), topaz, quartz, fluorite, and associated elements containing rare-earth metals.

The largest recorded heliodor crystal weighs 66.6 kg. Topaz and occurs in natural colors including wine-red, blue, yellowish-pink, and polychromatic varieties. It forms in pegmatites alongside beryl and quartz. Blue shades are particularly rare and typically require no enhancement. Crystals range from 10–12 cm and can weigh up to tens of kilograms, with a record specimen of 205 kg reported in 2025.

The deposit is one of the largest quartz sources in Europe, encompassing varieties such as rock crystal, smoky quartz, citrine, and morion. It is typically transparent, often with inclusions of rutile, actinolite, or hematite. Crystals range from small specimens to massive formations weighing up to 10 tons. Quartz from the deposit is used in jewelry, decorative stonework, collecting, and as piezoquartz in technological applications.

Fluorite forms crystals alongside quartz, topaz, and beryl. Its varieties include green octahedra (1–1.5 cm), purple cubes (0.5–2 cm), and dark purple aggregates (1–2 mm). It is found in specific pegmatite bodies, such as 306, 311, and 317. Fluorite is highly valued for its collectible qualities, comparable to topaz and beryl.

=== Associated minerals and rare-earth elements ===
The pegmatites host over 100 minerals, including rare-earth elements such as lanthanides (La, Ce, Nd, Sm, Eu), tantalum, niobium, lithium, cesium, and yttrium, found in minerals like monazite, bastnäsite, and allanite. These elements are critical for electronics, batteries, magnets, lasers, and green energy technologies, offering significant economic potential for Ukraine.
