= Khoroshiv Raion =

Former subdivision of Zhytomyr Oblast, Ukraine

Khoroshiv Raion Хорошівський район
- Raion
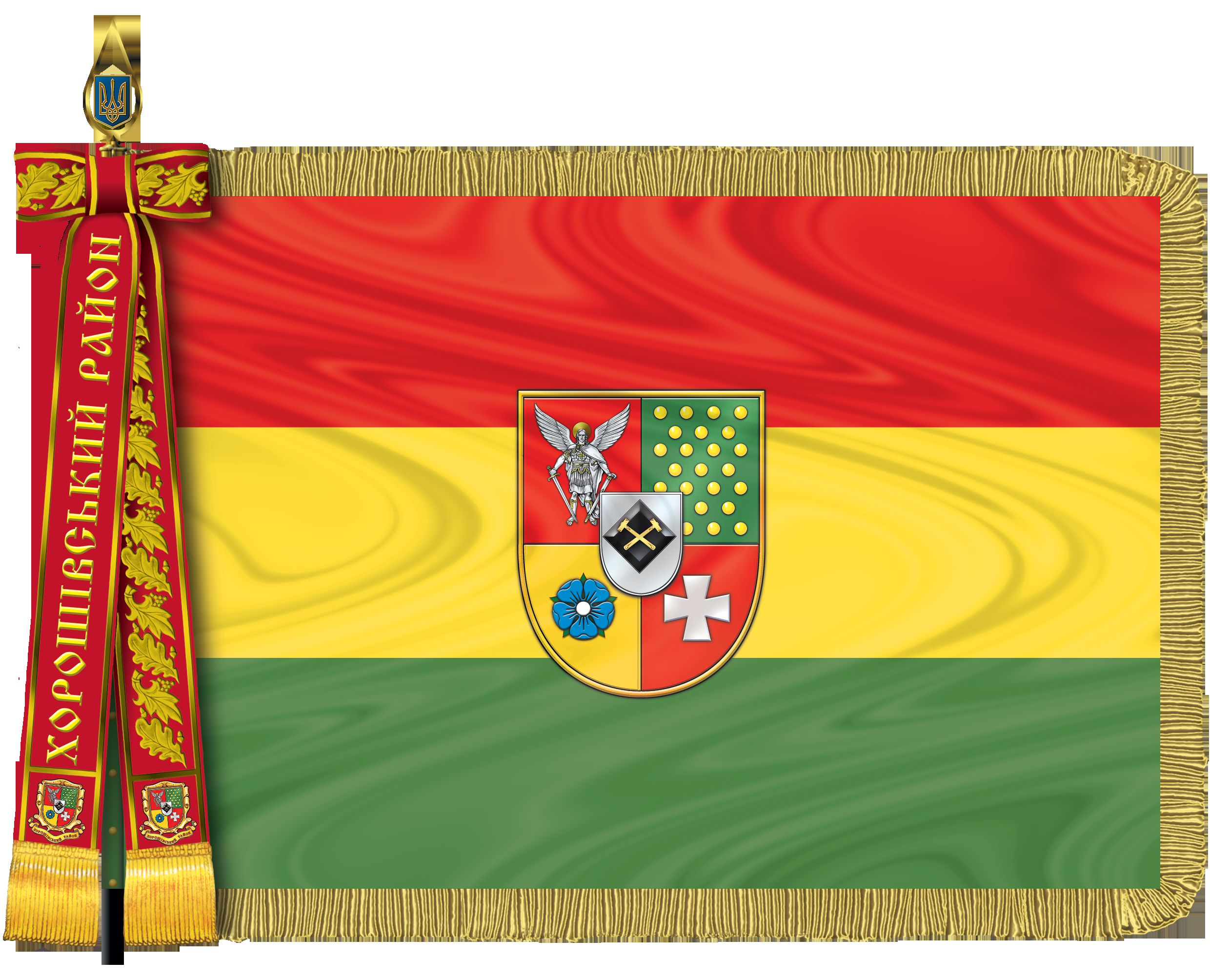
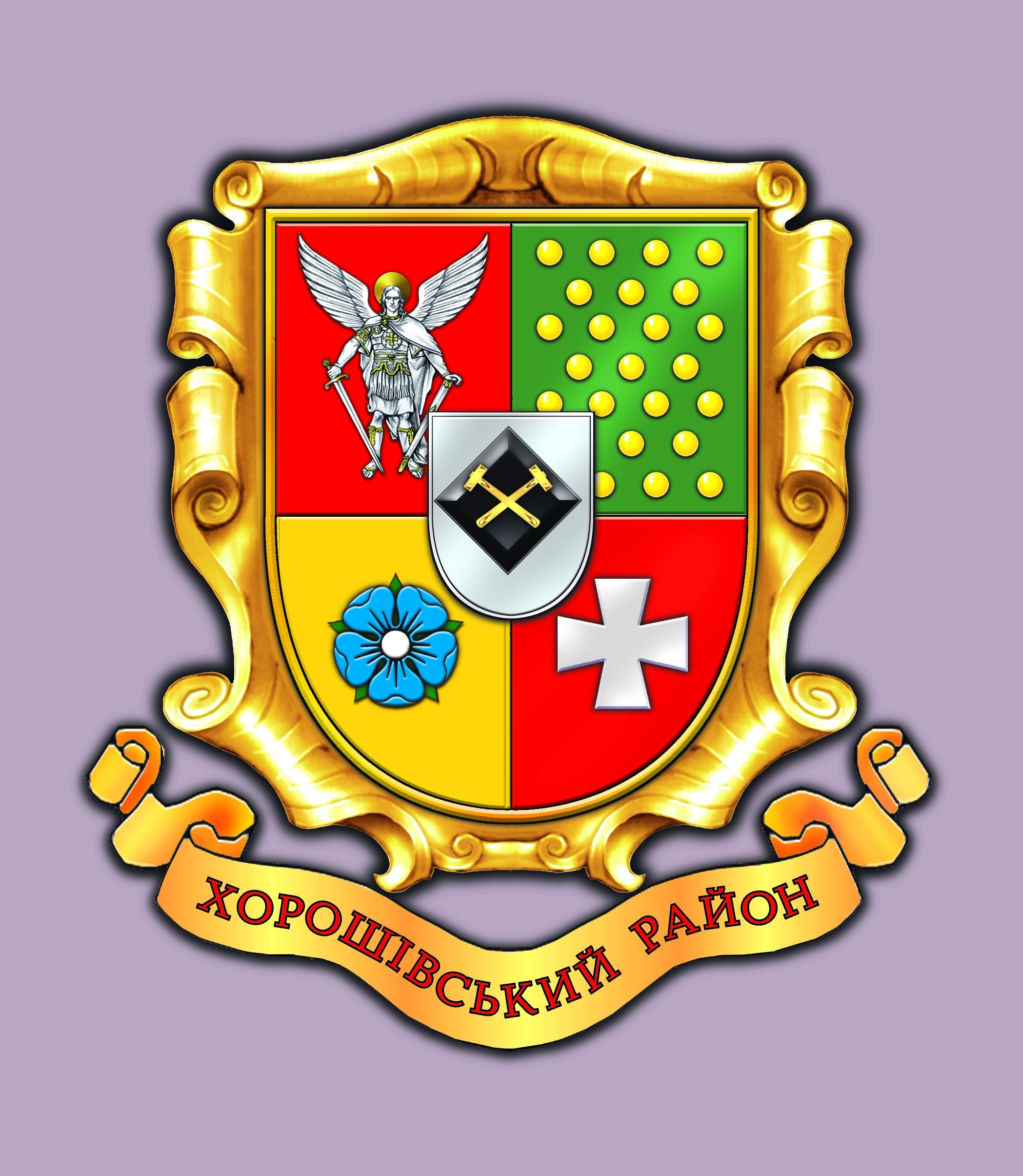
- Flag Coat of arms

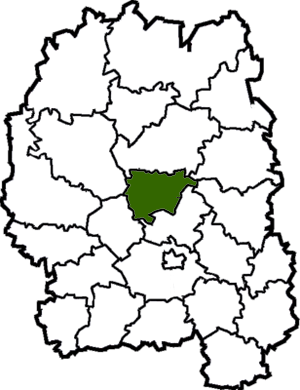
- Coordinates: 50°36′17″N 28°26′41″E
- Country: Ukraine
- Oblast: Zhytomyr Oblast
- Disestablished: 18 July 2020
- Admin. center: Khoroshiv
- Subdivisions: List: 0 — city councils; 3 — settlement councils; — rural councils; Number of localities: 0 — cities; 3 — urban-type settlements; — villages; — rural settlements

Area
  - Total: 869.8 km^{2} (335.8 sq mi)

Population (2020)
  - Total: 33,828 ▼
  - Density: 38.89/km^{2} (100.7/sq mi)
- Time zone: UTC+02:00 (EET)
  - Summer (DST): UTC+03:00 (EEST)
- Area code: +380

Khoroshiv Raion (Ukrainian: Хорошівський район), until 2015 Volodarsk-Volynskyi Raion (Володарськ-Волинський район), was a raion (district) of Zhytomyr Oblast, northern Ukraine. Its administrative centre was located at Khoroshiv. The raion covered an area of 869.8 square kilometres (335.8 mi^{2}). The raion was abolished on 18 July 2020 as part of the administrative reform of Ukraine, which reduced the number of raions of Zhytomyr Oblast to four. The area of Khoroshiv Raion was merged into Zhytomyr Raion. The last estimate of the raion population was 33,828 (2020 est.)

On 21 May 2016, Verkhovna Rada adopted decision to rename Volodarsk-Volynskyi Raion to Khoroshiv Raion according to the law prohibiting names of Communist origin. Volodarsk-Volynskyi was previously renamed to Khoroshiv.
