= Valentyn Rechmedin =

Ukrainian journalist and writer

Valentyn Ostapovych Rechmedin Валентин Остапович Речмедін
- Born: 12 February 1916; Andrushivka, Russian Empire (now Ukraine)
- Died: 6 June 1986 (aged 70); Kiev, Soviet Union (now Ukraine)
- Occupations: Journalist and writer

Valentyn Ostapovych Rechmedin (Ukrainian: Валентин Остапович Речмедін, Russian: Валентин Остапович Речмедин; 12 February 1916 – 6 June 1986) was a Ukrainian journalist and writer.

== Biography ==
He grew up in the village of Andrushivka in present Pohrebyshche Raion, Vinnytsia Oblast (province), where his father was a teacher.

After studies at Uman Cooperative Technicum (Уманський кооперативний технікум) he started his career as a journalist in 1934 at Molodyi Bilshovyk (Молодий Бiльшовик) in Vinnytsia. In 1939 he started to work at Vilna Ukraïna (Вільна Україна) and later at Leninska Molod (Ленінска Молодь) in Lviv.

Valentyn remained in Ukraine also after the German invasion of the Soviet Union in the summer of 1941. Later he became active in the Soviet partisan movement in the Vinnytsia area. In his partisan group he edited its Partyzanska Pravda. After the war he was awarded the Order of the Red Star.

After World War II he moved to Kiev where he worked at the newspapers Radianska Ukraïna, Literaturna Ukraïna (as deputy chief editor) and Kultura i zhyttia (as chief editor) and the magazine Vitchyzna (as deputy chief editor from 1963).

Valentyn started to write novels after the war. The stories were often based on his own experiences during the war. He always wrote in the Ukrainian language, but several books have been translated into Russian.

Valentyn was also a well-known drama and literary critic.

In one of his literary critiques of Mykhailo Stelmakh published in May 1972, Rechmedin noted: "The older generation sees itself in the heroes of Velyka ridnya, Krov lyudska - ne vodytsia, Pravda i Kryvda, Khlib i sil those who had their souls scarred with disaster, poverty, hard work and injustice.

== Bibliography ==
- 1951 Na verkhovyni
- 1958 Koly zakypala krov
- 1960 Viter z berehiv iunosty
- 1960 Vidchynyv u svit ya dveri...
- 1961 Vesniani hrozy
- 1962 Tvii pobratym. Romantychna istoria.
- 1965 Khodimo zi mnoiu, synu!
- 1967 Divchyna v ternovomu vinku
- 1971 Vohon batkovykh ran
- 1974 Narodzhennia Afrodity
- 1975 Pora piznikh dorih
- 1979 Za vesnoiu vesna
- 1983 Navpereimy doli
- 1986 Vybrani tvory (Koly zakypala krov & Khodimo zi mnoiu, synu!)
