= Kaniv Raion =

Former subdivision of Cherkasy Oblast, Ukraine

Kaniv Канівський район
- Raion
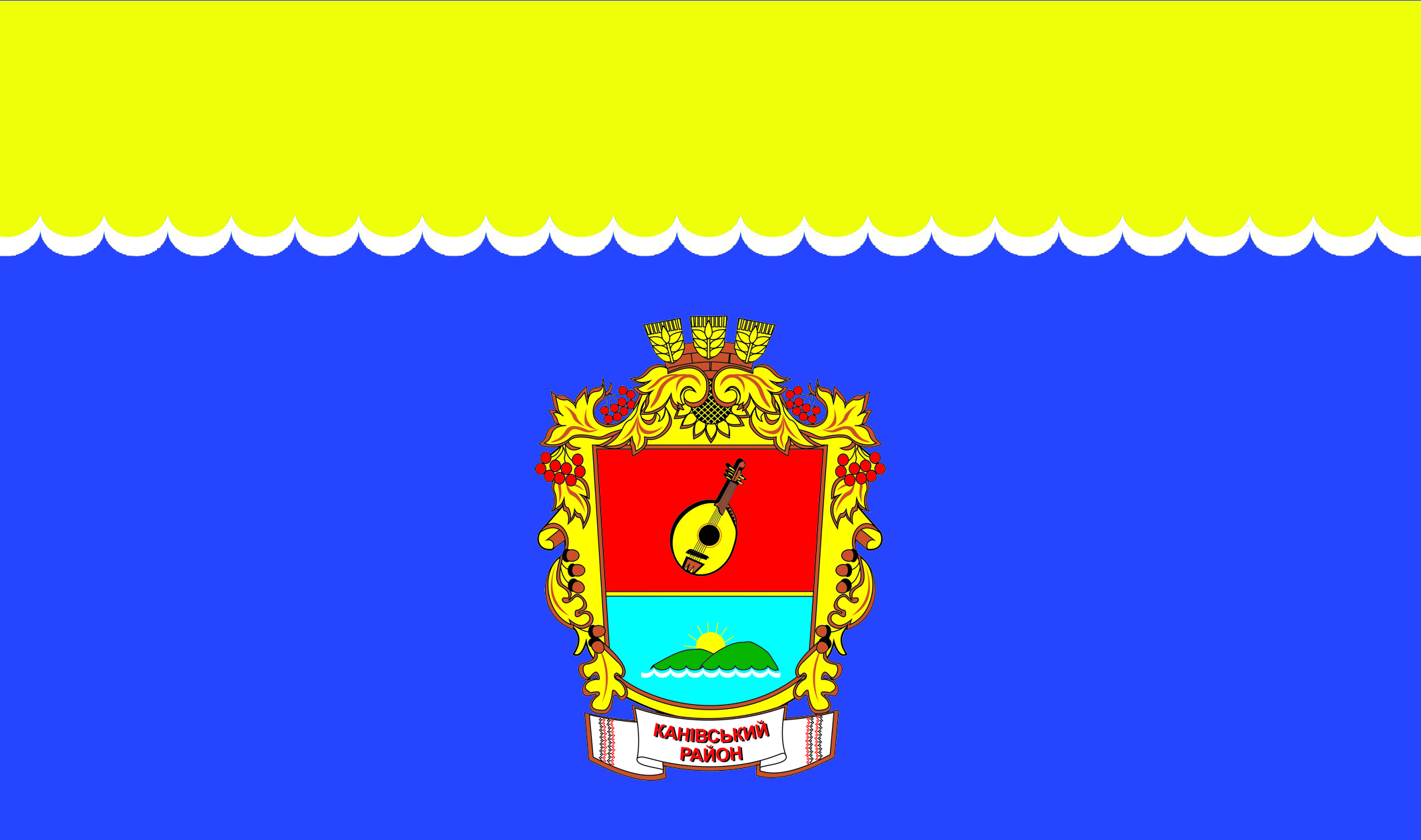
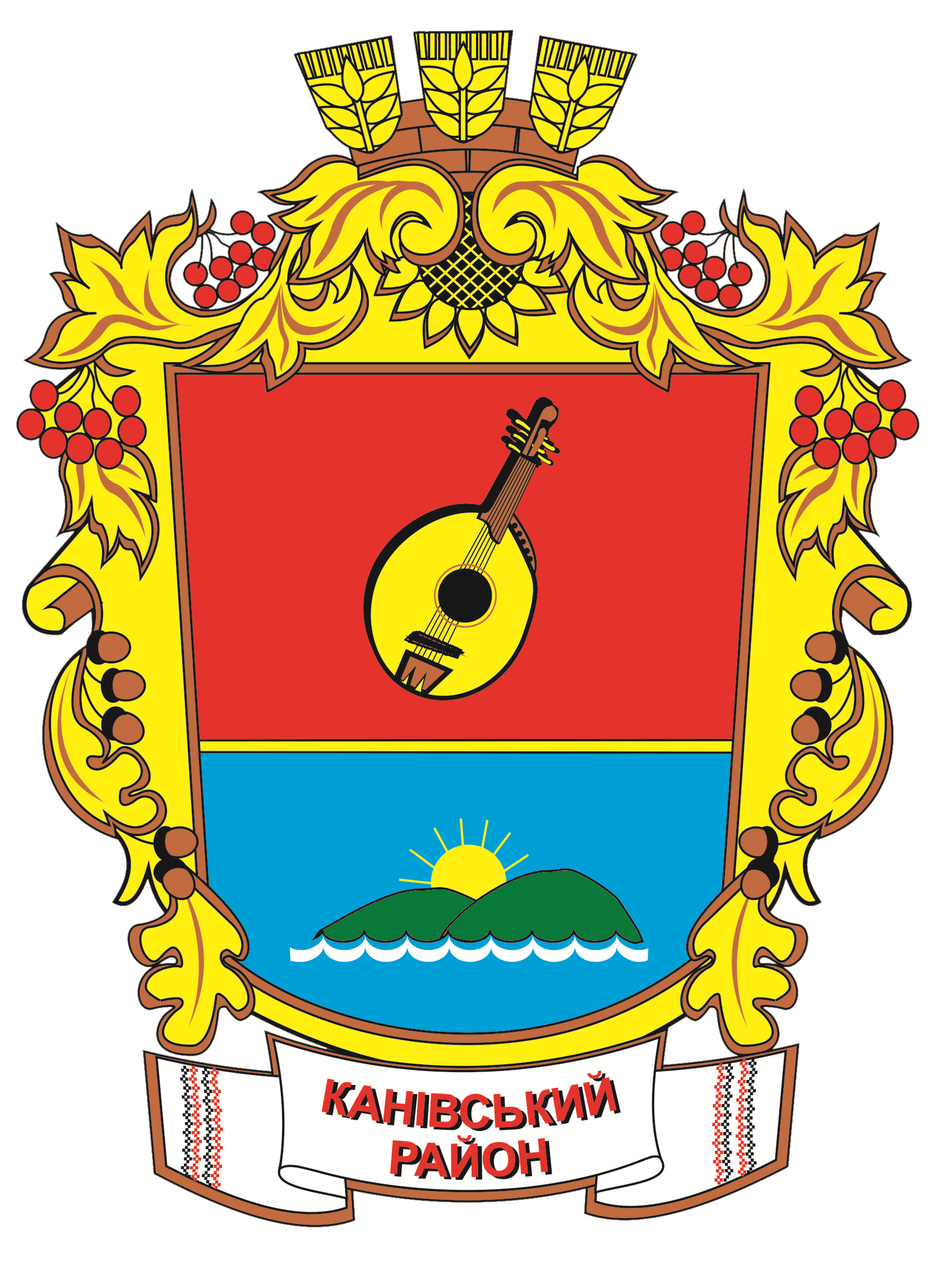
- Flag Coat of arms

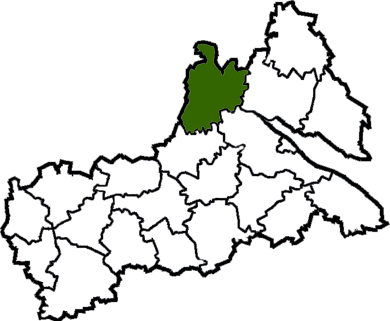
- Raion location in Cherkasy Oblast
- Coordinates: 49°45′30″N 31°19′36.6″E
- Country: Ukraine
- Oblast: Cherkasy Oblast
- Disestablished: 18 July 2020
- Admin. center: Kaniv

Population (2020)
  - Total: 18,587
- Time zone: UTC+2 (EET)
  - Summer (DST): UTC+3 (EEST)

Kaniv Raion (Ukrainian: Канівський район) was a raion (district) of Cherkasy Oblast, central Ukraine. Its administrative centre was located at the town of Kaniv which was incorporated separately as a city of oblast significance and did not belong to the raion. The raion was abolished on 18 July 2020 as part of the administrative reform of Ukraine, which reduced the number of raions of Cherkasy Oblast to four. The area of Kaniv Raion was merged into Cherkasy Raion. The last estimate of the raion population was 18,587 (2020 est.)

At the time of disestablishment, the raion consisted of three hromadas:

- Bobrytsia rural hromada with the administration in the selo of Bobrytsia;
- Lipliave rural hromada with the administration in the selo of Lipliave;
- Stepantsi rural hromada with the administration in the selo of Stepantsi.
