= Korostyshiv Raion =

Former subdivision of Zhytomyr Oblast, Ukraine

Korostyshiv Raion Коростишівський район
- Raion
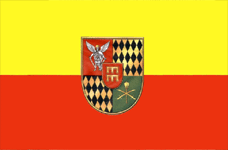
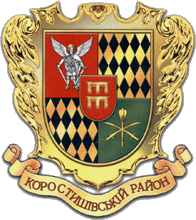
- Flag Coat of arms

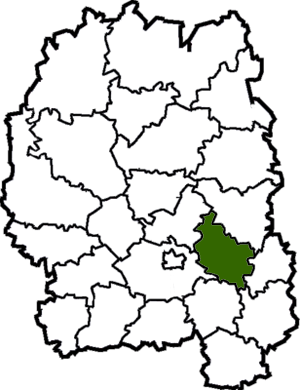
- Coordinates: 50°18′53″N 29°3′58″E
- Country: Ukraine
- Oblast: Zhytomyr Oblast
- Disestablished: 18 July 2020
- Admin. center: Korostyshiv
- Subdivisions: List: 1 — city councils; 0 — settlement councils; — rural councils; Number of localities: 1 — cities; 0 — urban-type settlements; — villages; — rural settlements

Area
  - Total: 973.9 km^{2} (376.0 sq mi)

Population (2020)
  - Total: 39,432 ▼
  - Density: 40.49/km^{2} (104.9/sq mi)
- Time zone: UTC+02:00 (EET)
  - Summer (DST): UTC+03:00 (EEST)
- Area code: +380

Korostyshiv Raion (Ukrainian: Коростишівський район) was a raion (district) of Zhytomyr Oblast, northern Ukraine. Its administrative centre was located at Korostyshiv. The raion covered an area of 973.9 square kilometres (376.0 mi^{2}). The raion was abolished on 18 July 2020 as part of the administrative reform of Ukraine, which reduced the number of raions of Zhytomyr Oblast to four. The area of Korostyshiv Raion was merged into Zhytomyr Raion. The last estimate of the raion population was 39,432 (2020 est.)
