= Ovruch Raion =

Former subdivision of Zhytomyr Oblast, Ukraine

Ovruch Raion Овруцький район
- Raion
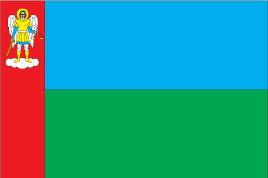
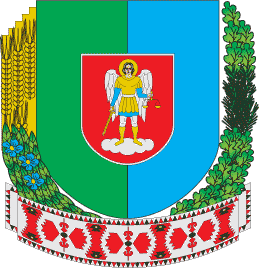
- Flag Coat of arms

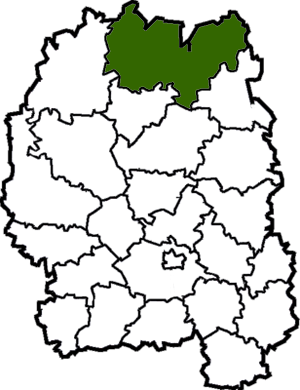
- Coordinates: 51°19′18″N 28°48′50″E
- Country: Ukraine
- Oblast: Zhytomyr Oblast
- Disestablished: 18 July 2020
- Admin. center: Ovruch
- Subdivisions: List: 1 — city councils; 1 — settlement councils; — rural councils; Number of localities: 1 — cities; 1 — urban-type settlements; — villages; — rural settlements

Area
  - Total: 3,222 km^{2} (1,244 sq mi)

Population (2020)
  - Total: 53,916 ▼
  - Density: 16.73/km^{2} (43.34/sq mi)
- Time zone: UTC+02:00 (EET)
  - Summer (DST): UTC+03:00 (EEST)
- Area code: +380

Ovruch Raion (Ukrainian: Овруцький район) was a raion (district) of Zhytomyr Oblast in northern Ukraine. Its administrative centre was located at Ovruch. The raion covered an area of 3,222 square kilometres (1,244 mi^{2}). The raion was abolished on 18 July 2020 as part of the administrative reform of Ukraine, which reduced the number of raions of Zhytomyr Oblast to four. The area of Ovruch Raion was merged into Korosten Raion. The last estimate of the raion population was 53,916 (2020 est.).

== See also ==
- Chernobyl disaster
- Chernobyl Exclusion Zone
