= Andrushivka Raion =

Former subdivision of Zhytomyr Oblast, Ukraine

Andrushivka Raion Андрушівський район
- Raion
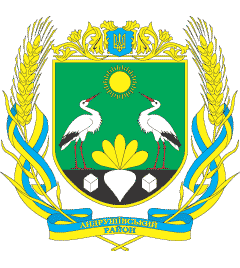
- Flag Coat of arms

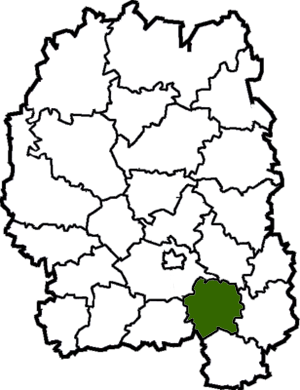
- Coordinates: 50°0′30″N 28°58′49″E
- Country: Ukraine
- Oblast: Zhytomyr Oblast
- Disestablished: 19 July 2020
- Admin. center: Andrushivka
- Subdivisions: List: 1 — city councils; 1 — settlement councils; — rural councils; Number of localities: 1 — cities; 1 — urban-type settlements; — villages; — rural settlements

Area
  - Total: 960.11 km^{2} (370.70 sq mi)

Population (2020)
  - Total: 32,030 ▼
  - Density: 33.36/km^{2} (86.40/sq mi)
- Time zone: UTC+02:00 (EET)
  - Summer (DST): UTC+03:00 (EEST)
- Area code: +380

Andrushivka Raion (Ukrainian: Андрушівський район) was a raion (district) of Zhytomyr Oblast, northern Ukraine. Its administrative centre was located at the town of Andrushivka. The raion covered an area of 960.11 square kilometres (370.70 mi^{2}). The raion was abolished on 19 July 2020 as part of the administrative reform of Ukraine, which reduced the number of raions of Zhytomyr Oblast to four. The area of Andrushivka Raion was merged into Berdychiv Raion. The last estimate of the raion population was 32,030 (2020 est.)
