= Brusyliv Raion =

Former subdivision of Zhytomyr Oblast, Ukraine

Brusyliv Raion Брусилівський район
- Raion
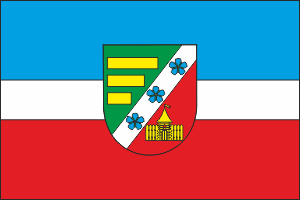
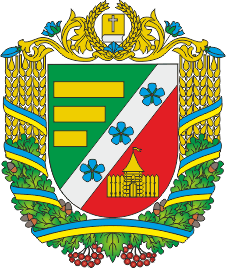
- Flag Coat of arms

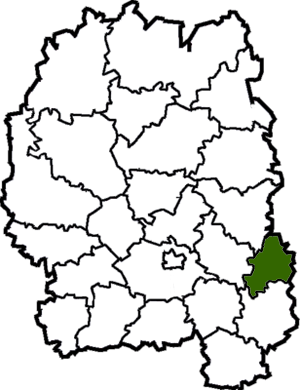
- Coordinates: 50°17′14″N 29°32′14″E
- Country: Ukraine
- Oblast: Zhytomyr Oblast
- Disestablished: 19 July 2020
- Admin. center: Brusyliv
- Subdivisions: List: 0 — city councils; 1 — settlement councils; — rural councils; Number of localities: 0 — cities; 1 — urban-type settlements; 36 — villages; — rural settlements

Area
  - Total: 625 km^{2} (241 sq mi)

Population (2020)
  - Total: 14,539 ▼
  - Density: 23.3/km^{2} (60.2/sq mi)
- Time zone: UTC+02:00 (EET)
  - Summer (DST): UTC+03:00 (EEST)
- Postal index: 126-XX
- Area code: +380

Brusyliv Raion (Ukrainian: Брусилівський район, romanized: Brusylivs'kyj rajon) was a raion (district) in the eastern part of Zhytomyr Oblast of northern Ukraine. Its administrative center was the urban-type settlement of Brusyliv, and it additionally consisted of 36 villages. The territory was 625 square kilometres (241 mi^{2}). The raion was abolished on 19 July 2020 as part of the administrative reform of Ukraine, which reduced the number of raions of Zhytomyr Oblast to four. The area of Brusyliv Raion was merged into Zhytomyr Raion. The last estimate of the raion population was 14,539 (2020 est.)

== Settlements ==
Rural settlements in Brusyliv raion included:

- Bolyachiv - 169 inhabitants
- Vodotyyi - 505 inhabitants
- Vilshka - 186 inhabitants
- Dyvyn - 324 inhabitants
- Yosypivka - 241 inhabitants
- Karabachyn - 309 inhabitants, on the river Zdvyzh
- Krakivshchyna - 115 inhabitants
- Lazarivka - 634 inhabitants
- Morozivka - 1,146 inhabitants
- Mistechko - 207 inhabitants, on the river Zdvyzh
- Novi Ozeryany - 603 inhabitants
- Ozera - 299 inhabitants
- Osivtsi - 684 inhabitants
- Pokryshiv - 479 inhabitants
- Pryvorittya - 803 inhabitants
- Romanivka - 275 inhabitants
- Skochyshche - 373 inhabitants
- Skochyshche Station
- Sobolivka - 538 inhabitants, on the Irpin River
- Soloviyivka - 892 inhabitants
- Stavyshche - 579 inhabitants
- Khomutets - 1,239 inhabitants
- Yastrubenka - 208 inhabitants

== Brief ==
It was situated in the south-eastern part of the region. Distance from the district (urban-type Brusyliv) to the regional center - 80 km by highways.

== Natural tourist objects ==
There are centres of relaxation and recreational resources of reservoirs on the rivers Zdvyzh and Irpin.

== Social and historical tourist objects ==
There are the settlements of the Kievan Rus, (XI-XII.) in the villages Soloviyivka, Sobolivka, Skochyshche, Mistechko among the archaeological monuments. Architecture –memorials- the church of 17th century in v. Ozera, the remains of the castle of Capuchin Order (1787) in Brusyliv; bust of Taras Shevchenko (1997) in the former district center, a memorial sign on the place estate of church and religious figure I. Ohienko.

== Natives of region ==
Aron Baron (Russian: Аро́н Дави́дович Ба́рон; 1891–1937) was an anarcho-syndicalist revolutionary and theorist. Scientific, religious and church figure I. Ogienko; a singer, People's Artist of USSR Y. Chervonyuk, a graphic artist, the Honored Artist of the USSR A. Lopukhova; an artist, the Honored Artist of the USSR A. Makarenko; director, People's Artist of USSR B. Nord; in this village passed the young years of ex-mayor of Kyiv, deputy of the Supreme Council of Ukraine Oleksandr Omelchenko (all - Brusilov); a physicist, corresponding member of NAS of Ukraine M. Lysytsia (v. Vysoke), the Doctors of Medical Sciences V. Bondarenko and B . Omelchenko; The Doctor of Historical D. Pohylevych (p. Vodotyi);the Doctor of Geographical Sciences, corresponding member of the APSU P. Shishchenko (v. Pokryshiv), People's Artist of USSR P. Nyatko-Tabachnykova and the Doctor of Historical Berezovchuk M. (v. Karabchyn), People's Artist of USSR P. Karmelyuk, the doctor of Medicine I. Kaminskyi- Heleta (v. Soloviyivka); the Honored Artist of the USSR V. Savchenko (v. Yastrebenka).
