= Radomyshl Raion =

Former subdivision of Zhytomyr Oblast, Ukraine

Radomyshl Raion Радомишльський район
- Raion
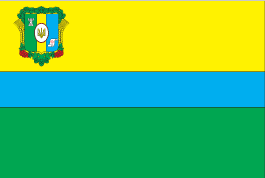
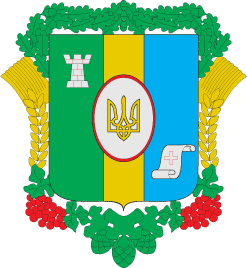
- Flag Coat of arms

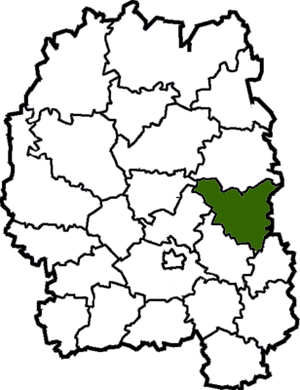
- Coordinates: 50°29′56″N 29°14′0″E
- Country: Ukraine
- Oblast: Zhytomyr Oblast
- Disestablished: 18 July 2020
- Admin. center: Radomyshl
- Subdivisions: List: 1 — city councils; 2 — settlement councils; — rural councils; Number of localities: 1 — cities; 2 — urban-type settlements; — villages; — rural settlements

Area
  - Total: 1,297 km^{2} (501 sq mi)

Population (2020)
  - Total: 36,069 ▼
  - Density: 27.81/km^{2} (72.03/sq mi)
- Time zone: UTC+02:00 (EET)
  - Summer (DST): UTC+03:00 (EEST)
- Area code: +380

Radomyshl Raion (Ukrainian: Радомишльський район) was a raion (district) in Zhytomyr Oblast (province) of northern Ukraine. Its administrative center was the city of Radomyshl. The raion was abolished on 18 July 2020 as part of the administrative reform of Ukraine, which reduced the number of raions of Zhytomyr Oblast to four. The area of Radomyshl Raion was merged into Zhytomyr Raion. The last estimate of the raion's population was 36,069 (2020 est.)
