= Yemilchyne Raion =

Former subdivision of Zhytomyr Oblast, Ukraine

Yemilchyne Raion Ємільчинський район
- Raion
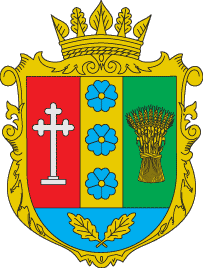
- Flag Coat of arms

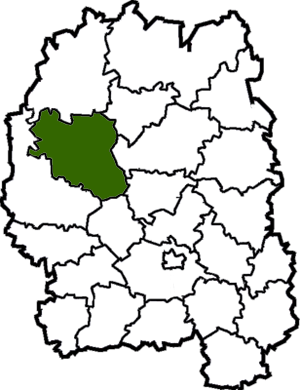
- Coordinates: 50°52′37″N 27°48′28″E
- Country: Ukraine
- Oblast: Zhytomyr Oblast
- Disestablished: 18 July 2020
- Admin. center: Yemilchyne
- Subdivisions: List: 0 — city councils; 2 — settlement councils; — rural councils; Number of localities: 0 — cities; 2 — urban-type settlements; — villages; — rural settlements

Area
  - Total: 2,112 km^{2} (815 sq mi)

Population (2020)
  - Total: 31,615 ▼
  - Density: 14.97/km^{2} (38.77/sq mi)
- Time zone: UTC+02:00 (EET)
  - Summer (DST): UTC+03:00 (EEST)
- Area code: +380

Yemilchyne Raion (Ukrainian: Ємільчинський район) was a raion (district) of Zhytomyr Oblast, northern Ukraine. Its administrative centre was located at Yemilchyne. The raion covered an area of 2,112 square kilometres (815 mi^{2}). The raion was abolished on 18 July 2020 as part of the administrative reform of Ukraine, which reduced the number of raions of Zhytomyr Oblast to four. The area of Yemilchyne Raion was merged into Novohrad-Volynskyi Raion. The last estimate of the raion population was 31,615 (2020 est.)
