= Olevsk Raion =

Former subdivision of Zhytomyr Oblast, Ukraine

Olevsk Raion Олевський район
- Raion
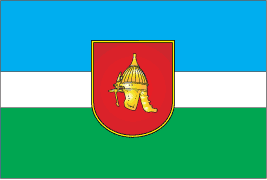
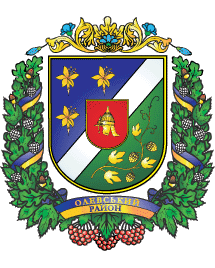
- Flag Coat of arms

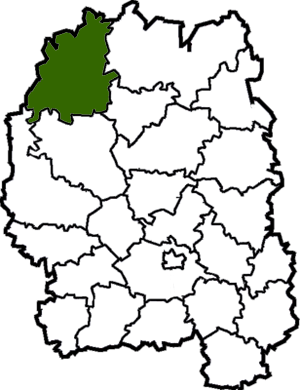
- Coordinates: 51°13′27″N 27°39′10″E
- Country: Ukraine
- Oblast: Zhytomyr Oblast
- Disestablished: 18 July 2020
- Admin. center: Olevsk
- Subdivisions: List: 1 — city councils; 5 — settlement councils; — rural councils; Number of localities: 1 — cities; 5 — urban-type settlements; — villages; — rural settlements

Area
  - Total: 2,248 km^{2} (868 sq mi)

Population (2020)
  - Total: 40,721 ▼
  - Density: 18.11/km^{2} (46.92/sq mi)
- Time zone: UTC+02:00 (EET)
  - Summer (DST): UTC+03:00 (EEST)
- Area code: +380

Olevsk Raion (Ukrainian: Олевський район) was a raion (district) of Zhytomyr Oblast, northern Ukraine. Its administrative centre was located at Olevsk. The raion covered an area of 2,248 square kilometres (868 mi^{2}). The raion was abolished on 18 July 2020 as part of the administrative reform of Ukraine, which reduced the number of raions of Zhytomyr Oblast to four. The area of Olevsk Raion was merged into Korosten Raion. The last estimate of the raion population was 40,721 (2020 est.)
