= Tetiiv Raion =

Former subdivision of Kyiv Oblast, Ukraine

Tetiiv Raion Тетіївський район
- Raion
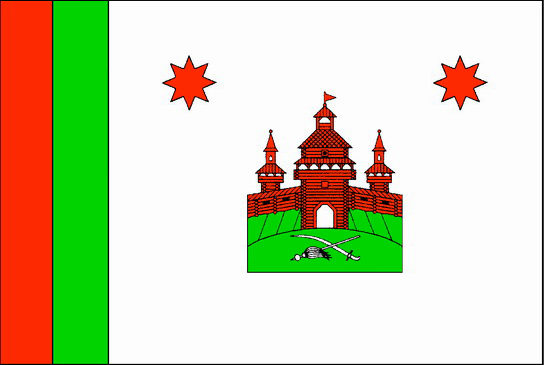
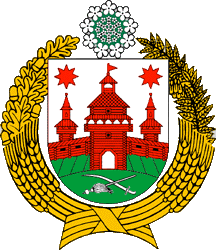
- Flag Coat of arms

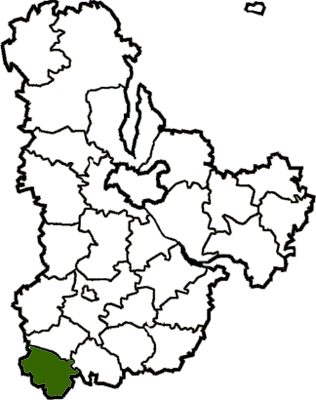
- Coordinates: 49°20′25″N 29°45′23″E
- Country: Ukraine
- Region: Kyiv Oblast
- Disestablished: 18 July 2020
- Admin. center: Tetiiv
- Subdivisions: List: — city councils; — settlement councils; — rural councils; Number of localities: — cities; — urban-type settlements; 32 — villages; — rural settlements

Population (2020)
  - Total: 31,001
- Time zone: UTC+02:00 (EET)
  - Summer (DST): UTC+03:00 (EEST)
- Area code: +380

Tetiiv raion (Ukrainian: Тетіївський район) was a raion (district) in Kyiv Oblast of Ukraine. Its administrative center was the city of Tetiiv. The raion was abolished on 18 July 2020 as part of the administrative reform of Ukraine, which reduced the number of raions of Kyiv Oblast to seven. The area of Tetiiv Raion was merged into Bila Tserkva Raion. The last estimate of the raion population was 31,001 (2020 est.).

At the time of disestablishment, the raion consisted of one hromada, Tetiiv urban hromada with the administration in Tetiiv.
