= Khoroshiv =

Rural locality in Zhytomyr Oblast, Ukraine

Khoroshiv Хорошів
- Rural settlement
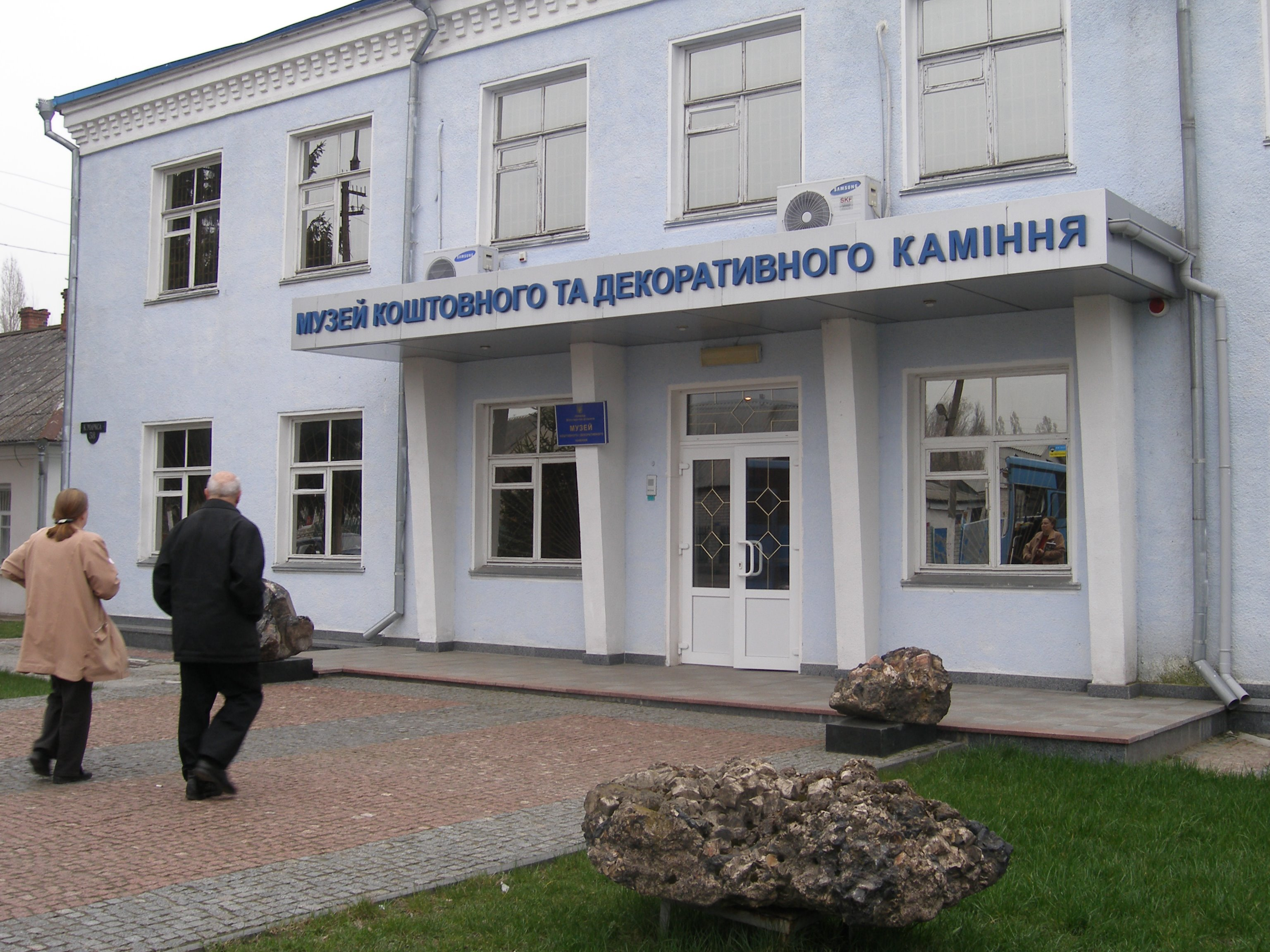
- Khoroshiv gemstones museum

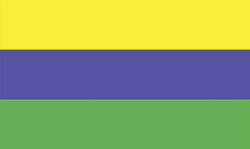
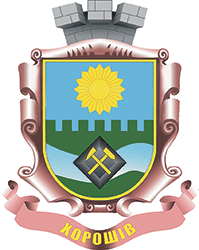
- Flag Coat of arms

- Location in Ukraine Khoroshiv (Ukraine)
- Coordinates: 50°35′44″N 28°26′41″E
- Country: Ukraine
- Oblast: Zhytomyr Oblast
- Raion: Zhytomyr Raion
- First mention: 1545

Area
  - Total: 8.328 km^{2} (3.215 sq mi)

Population (2022)
  - Total: 7,335
  - Density: 880.8/km^{2} (2,281/sq mi)
- Time zone: UTC+2 (EET)
  - Summer (DST): UTC+3 (EEST)

Khoroshiv (Ukrainian: Хорошiв, Russian: Хо́рошев), until 2015 Volodarsk-Volynskyi (Ukrainian: Володарськ-Волинський, translit. Volodarsk-Volynskyi) is a rural settlement in Zhytomyr Raion, Zhytomyr Oblast, Ukraine. Population: 7,335 (2022 estimate)

== History ==
The settlement was first mentioned in 1545 as Oleksandropil. It was owned by szlachcic Alexander Pronsky, and after his death was inherited by the Polish Leszczynski family. In 1525, the town, then called Horoshky, was sold to Nemyrych family. During the Khmelnytsky Uprising Horoshky belonged to Kiev Regiment, but in 1667 were returned to Poland according to the Treaty of Andrusovo. In 1685-1699 the town was once again controlled by Ukrainian Cossacks under the leadership of Semen Paliy. After the Second Partition of Poland Horoshky became part of the Russian Empire. In 1796, Empress Catherine II confiscated the local manor from its Polish owners and awarded it to field marshal Mikhail Kutuzov. To commemorate this fact, in 1912 the imperial authorities renamed Horoshky to Kutuzove. In 1917, the town became part of the Ukrainian People's Republic, but in 1921 was finally occupied by the Red Army and renamed to Volodarsk (since 1927 - Volodarsk-Volynsky), after the Bolshevik politician V.Volodarsky. After Ukraine regained independence, the settlement was finally renamed to Khoroshiv in 2016, as part of the decommunization campaign.

Until 26 January 2024, Khoroshiv was designated urban-type settlement. On this day, a new law entered into force which abolished this status, and Khoroshiv became a rural settlement.

== Industry ==
The Khoroshiv-Volodarsk mine has been open since at least 1991 and produces mostly precious stones including topaz.

The area around it contains spodumene, gold, pegmatite, blue fluorite with pyrite and limonite mineral deposits.

== Points of interest ==
- 17th century fortification walls
- Catholic Church of Transfiguration
- Male Orthodox monastery of Saint Paisius
- Orthodox and Protestant churches
- Kutuzov park
- Museum of valuable and decorative stones
- Monument to Taras Shevchenko

== Notable personalities ==
- Yuri Nemyrych - politician and aristocrat of the Polish-Lithuanian Commonwealth, owned the settlement in the 17th century.
- Alexander Dovzhenko - Ukrainian Soviet filmmaker, worked as a teacher in a local school in 1914.
