= Zhytomyr Oblast =

Province of Ukraine

Zhytomyr Oblast Житомирська область
- Oblast
- Zhytomyrska oblast
- Flag Coat of arms
- Nickname: Житомирщина (Zhytomyrshchyna)
- Interactive map of Zhytomyr Oblast in Ukraine
- Coordinates: 50.65°N 28.52°E
- Country: Ukraine
- Administrative center: Zhytomyr

Government
  - Governor: Vitaliy Bunechko
  - Oblast council: 64 seats
  - Chairperson: Volodymyr Fedorenko

Area
  - Total: 29,832 km^{2} (11,518 sq mi)
  - Rank: Ranked 5th

Population (2022)
  - Total: 1,179,032 ▼
  - Rank: Ranked 16th
  - Density: 39.522/km^{2} (102.36/sq mi)

GDP
  - Total: ₴ 114 billion (€3.0 billion)
  - Per capita: ₴ 95,948 (€2,500)
- Time zone: UTC+2 (EET)
  - Summer (DST): UTC+3 (EEST)
- Postal code: from 10 to 13
- Area code: +380-41
- ISO 3166 code: UA-18
- Raions: 4
- Cities: 11
- Settlements: 43
- Villages: 1625
- HDI (2022): 0.737 high
- FIPS 10-4: UP27
- NUTS statistical regions of Ukraine: UA82
- Website: oda.zht.gov.ua

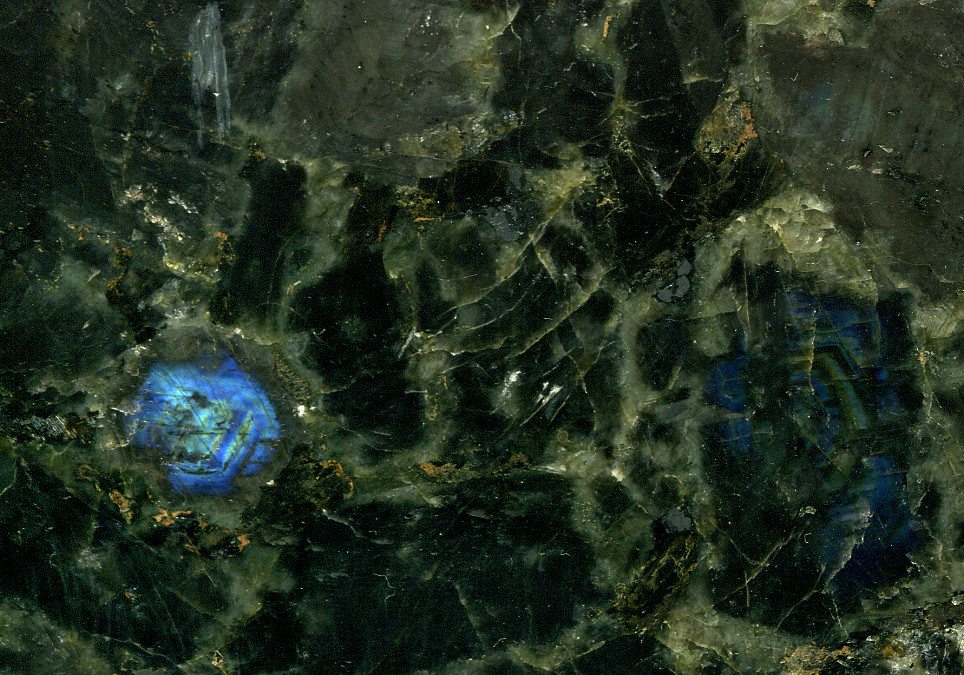
"Volga Blue Granite" (anorthosite), a popular decorative stone quarried between the cities of Korosten and Zhytomyr, central Zhytomyr Oblast

Zhytomyr Oblast (Ukrainian: Житомирська область, romanized: Zhytomyrska oblast), also referred to as Zhytomyrshchyna (Ukrainian: Житомирщина), is an oblast (province) in northwestern Ukraine. The administrative center of the oblast is the city of Zhytomyr. Its population is approximately 1,179,032 (2022 estimate).

== History ==
Flag of Zhytomyr Oblast, used for a short period between 2002 and 2003.

The oblast was created as part of the Ukrainian Soviet Socialist Republic on September 22, 1937, out of territories of Vinnytsia and Kyiv oblasts as well as two border okrugs of Kyiv Oblast – Korosten Okrug and Novohrad-Volynsky Okrug.

The oblast covers territories of the historic regions of Polesia, Volhynia, and Podolia, which are reflected on the oblast's coat of arms.

Before the 18th century the larger half of the oblast belonged to the Kyiv Voivodeship (Polish: Kijów), while the smaller western half around the city of Zviahel belonged to the Volyn Voivodeship. Following the Treaty of Andrusovo, the city of Zhytomyr (Polish: Zytomierz) continued to act as an administrative center of the Kyiv Voivodeship.

Following the second partition of Poland, on the newly annexed territory was formed an oversized Izyaslav Vice-royalty (Russian: namestnichestvo) which included former Polish territories in Volhynia, Podolia, and Kyiv land and centered in Izyaslav. However, a couple of years later the Russian Empire annexed more territories of the Polish Kingdom during the third partition of Poland, contributing to the complete disappearance of the Polish statehood. The Izyaslav Vice-royalty was reformed and the territory of today's Zhytomyr Oblast predominantly ended up in the Russian Volhynian Governorate and the city of Zviahel which was renamed as Novohrad-Volynskyi (Russian: Novograd-Volynskiy) became its administrative center. Later the administrative center was transferred to the bigger city of Zhytomyr (Russian: Zhitomir).

During the 2022 Russian invasion of Ukraine Russian troops partly occupied the region. They were completely repulsed when the Narodychi settlement hromada (where Russian forces had been dug in from the opening of the offensive in late February 2022) was declared liberated on 4 April 2022.

== Geography ==
The total area of Zhytomyr Oblast is 29,832 km^{2} (11,518 sq mi).

Among the points of interest it is important to mention the following sites that were nominated for the Seven Wonders of Ukraine:

- Church of Saint Basil the Great (Ovruch)
- Stone village state preserve
- Korolev Memorial Astronautical Museum

There are 58 monuments of national significance in Zhytomyr Oblast.

The Museum of Ukrainian home icons, which is the only one in Europe, is situated in Zhytomyr Oblast. It is located in Radomyshl, a small town, about 90 km (56 mi) away from Kyiv. The museum is the part of the Radomysl Castle historical and cultural complex. It was founded by Olga Bogomolets.

== Population ==
The current estimated population of the oblast is 1,268,903 (as of 2013).

According to the 2001 Ukrainian census, ethnic Ukrainians accounted for 90.3% of the population of Zhytomyr Oblast, ethnic Russians for 5.0%, and ethnic Poles for 3.5%.

The current estimated population of the oblast is 1,268,903 (as of 2013).

=== Language ===
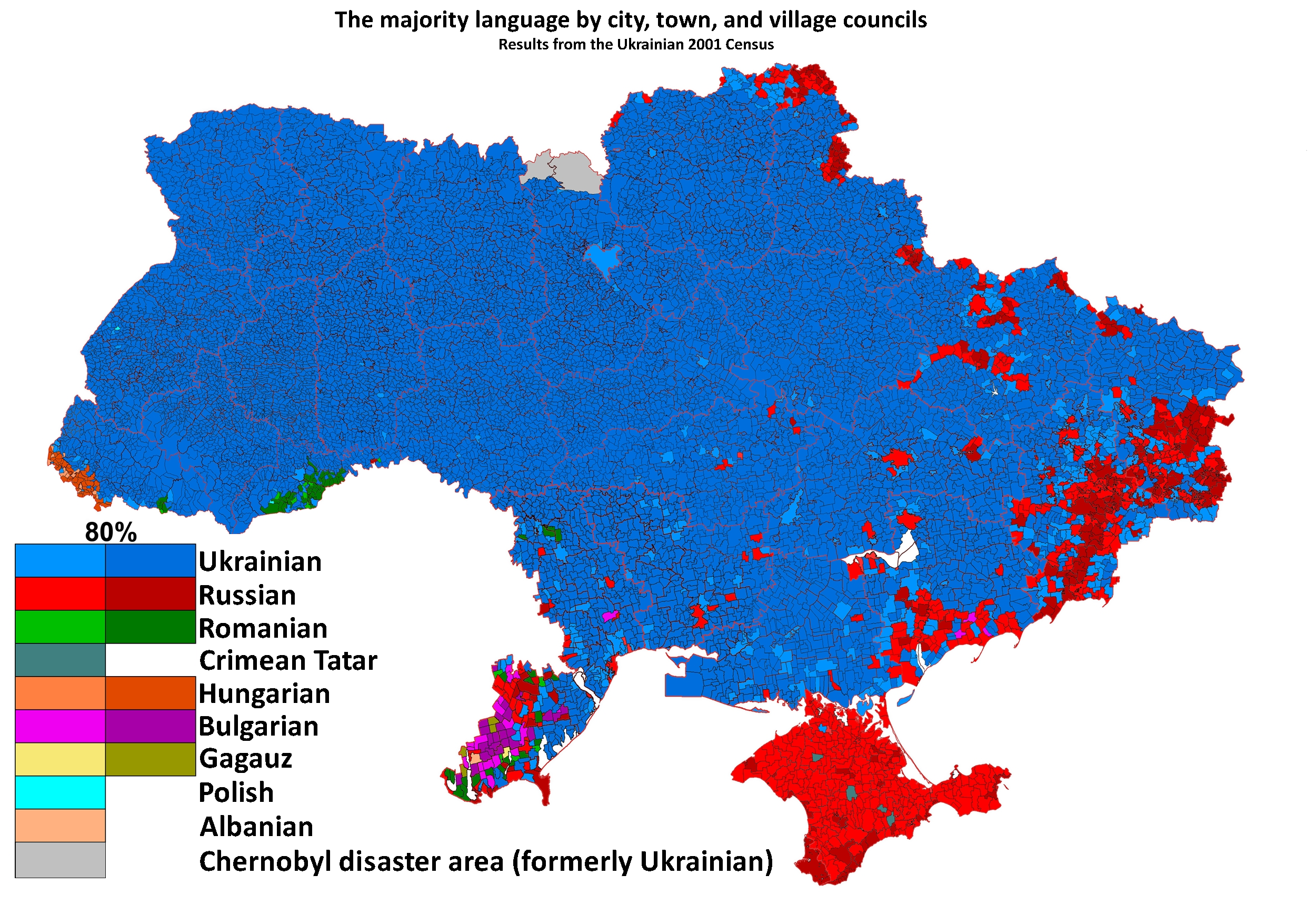
According to the 2001 Ukrainian census, Ukrainian was the native language for over 93% of Zhytomyr Oblast's population: it was the dominant language in all of the city, town, and village councils of the oblast.

Due to the Russification of Ukraine during the Soviet era, the share of Ukrainian speakers in the population of Zhytomyr Oblast gradually decreased between the 1970 and 1989 censuses, while the share of Russian speakers increased. Native language of the population of Zhytomyr Oblast according to the results of population censuses:

	1959	1970	1989	2001
Ukrainian	83.2%	89.6%	87.2%	93.0%
Russian	8.9%	9.4%	12.0%	6.6%
Other	7.9%	1.0%	0.8%	0.4%

Native language of the population of the raions and cities of Zhytomyr Oblast according to the 2001 Ukrainian census:

	Ukrainian	Russian
Zhytomyr Oblast	93.0%	6.6%
City of Zhytomyr	83.2%	16.3%
City of Berdychiv	89.0%	10.6%
City of Korosten	86.7%	12.7%
City of Novohrad-Volynskyi	89.4%	10.0%
Andrushivka Raion	97.7%	2.0%
Baranivka Raion	98.5%	1.3%
Berdychiv Raion (in pre-2020 borders)	98.0%	1.8%
Brusyliv Raion	97.0%	2.7%
Khoroshiv Raion	96.2%	3.5%
Romaniv Raion	98.1%	1.6%
Yemilchyne Raion	98.4%	1.5%
Zhytomyr Raion (in pre-2020 borders)	93.6%	6.1%
Korosten Raion (in pre-2020 borders)	97.8%	1.7%
Korostyshiv Raion	94.8%	4.9%
Luhyny Raion	98.3%	1.4%
Liubar Raion	98.8%	1.1%
Malyn Raion	96.3%	3.2%
Narodychi Raion	97.1%	1.8%
Novohrad-Volynskyi Raion (in pre-2020 borders)	98.5%	1.4%
Ovruch Raion	95.9%	3.5%
Olevsk Raion	98.2%	1.3%
Popilnia Raion	97.3%	2.1%
Radomyshl Raion	97.2%	2.5%
Ruzhyn Raion	98.7%	1.1%
Pulyny Raion	98.3%	1.5%
Cherniakhiv Raion	98.6%	1.3%
Chudniv Raion	97.8%	2.0%

Ukrainian is the only official language on the whole territory of Zhytomyr Oblast.

On 20 December 2018, a moratorium on the public use of Russian-language cultural products was imposed in Zhytomyr Oblast by a decision of the Zhytomyr Oblast Council.

According to a poll conducted by Rating from 16 November to 10 December 2018 as part of the project «Portraits of Regions», 74% of the residents of Zhytomyr Oblast believed that the Ukrainian language should be the only state language on the entire territory of Ukraine. 14% believed that Ukrainian should be the only state language, while Russian should be the second official language in some regions of the country. 9% believed that Russian should become the second state language of the country. 3% found it difficult to answer.

On 18 November 2022, Zhytomyr Oblast Military Administration approved the «Oblast programme for the development of the Ukrainian language in all spheres of public life in Zhytomyr Oblast for 2022—2025», the main objective of which is to strengthen the positions of the Ukrainian language in various spheres of public life in the oblast.

According to the research of the Content Analysis Centre, conducted from 15 August to 15 September 2024, the topic of which was the ratio of Ukrainian and Russian languages in the Ukrainian segment of social media, 84.0% of posts from Zhytomyr Oblast were written in Ukrainian (76.1% in 2023, 73.5% in 2022, 24.6% in 2020), while 16.0% were written in Russian (23.9% in 2023, 26.5% in 2022, 75.4% in 2020).

After Ukraine declared independence in 1991, Zhytomyr Oblast, as well as Ukraine as a whole, experienced a gradual Ukrainization of the education system, which had been Russified during the Soviet era. Dynamics of the ratio of the languages of instruction in general secondary education institutions in Zhytomyr Oblast:

Language of instruction, % of pupils	1991— 1992	1992— 1993	1993— 1994	1994— 1995	1995— 1996	2000— 2001	2005— 2006	2007— 2008	2010— 2011	2012— 2013	2015— 2016	2018— 2019	2021— 2022	2022— 2023
Ukrainian	76.7%	79.1%	82.7%	85.1%	86.0%	96.0%	99.0%	99.0%	99.0%	99.0%	99.5%	99.7%	100.0%	100.0%
Russian	23.3%	20.9%	17.2%	14.9%	14.0%	4.0%	1.0%	1.0%	1.0%	1.0%	0.5%	0.3%	—	—

According to the State Statistics Service of Ukraine, in the 2023—2024 school year, all 133,037 pupils in general secondary education institutions in Zhytomyr Oblast were studying in classes where Ukrainian was the language of instruction.

=== Age structure ===
0-14 years: 15.8% ▲ (male 103,194/female 97,617)
15-64 years: 68.1% ▼ (male 420,285/female 444,803)
65 years and over: 16.1% ▼ (male 65,301/female 138,472) (2013 official)

=== Median age ===
total: 39.4 years ▲
male: 36.1 years ▲
female: 42.6 years ▲ (2013 official)

== Economy ==
The economy of Zhytomyr Oblast mostly deals with mining of granite and other construction stone, forestry, agriculture and various machinery manufacturing.

The northern part of the province is highly affected by the Chernobyl disaster: some of the towns and raions are devastated and are included in the Chernobyl zone, while others are prohibited from producing their own agriculture.

== Administrative divisions ==
Zhytomyr Oblast is subdivided into 4 raions (districts).

The districts of Zhytomyr oblast include:

- Berdychiv Raion (Бердичівський район)
- Korosten Raion (Коростенський район)
- Zhytomyr Raion (Житомирський район)
- Zviahel Raion (Звягельський район)

=== Important cities and settlements ===
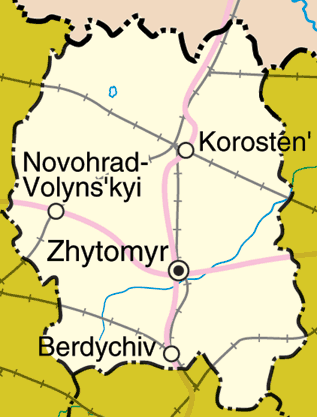
Detailed map of Zhytomyr Oblast.

List of biggest populated places of Zhytomyr Oblast with population in thousands:

- Zhytomyr – 266.9
- Berdychiv – 73.0
- Korosten – 63.5
- Zviahel – 56.3
- Malyn – 26.2
- Korostyshiv – 25.4
- Ovruch – 15.8
- Radomyshl – 14.6
- Baranivka – 11.8
- Olevsk – 10.5

== Nomenclature ==
Most of Ukraine's oblasts are named after their capital cities, officially referred to as "oblast centers" (Ukrainian: обласний центр, translit. oblasnyi tsentr). The name of each oblast is a relative adjective, formed by adding a feminine suffix to the name of respective center city: Zhytomyr is the center of the Zhytomyrs'ka oblast' (Zhytomyr Oblast). Most oblasts are also sometimes referred to in a feminine noun form, following the convention of traditional regional place names, ending with the suffix "-shchyna", as is the case with Zhytomyr Oblast, Zhytomyrshchyna.

== Gallery ==
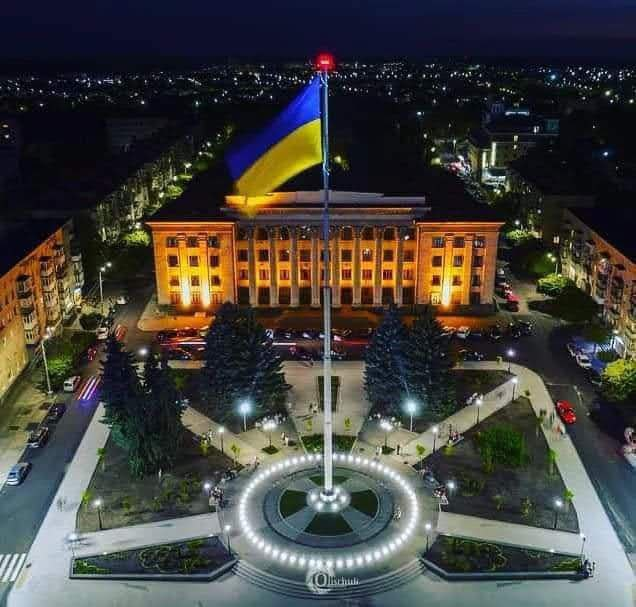
Centre of Zhytomyr

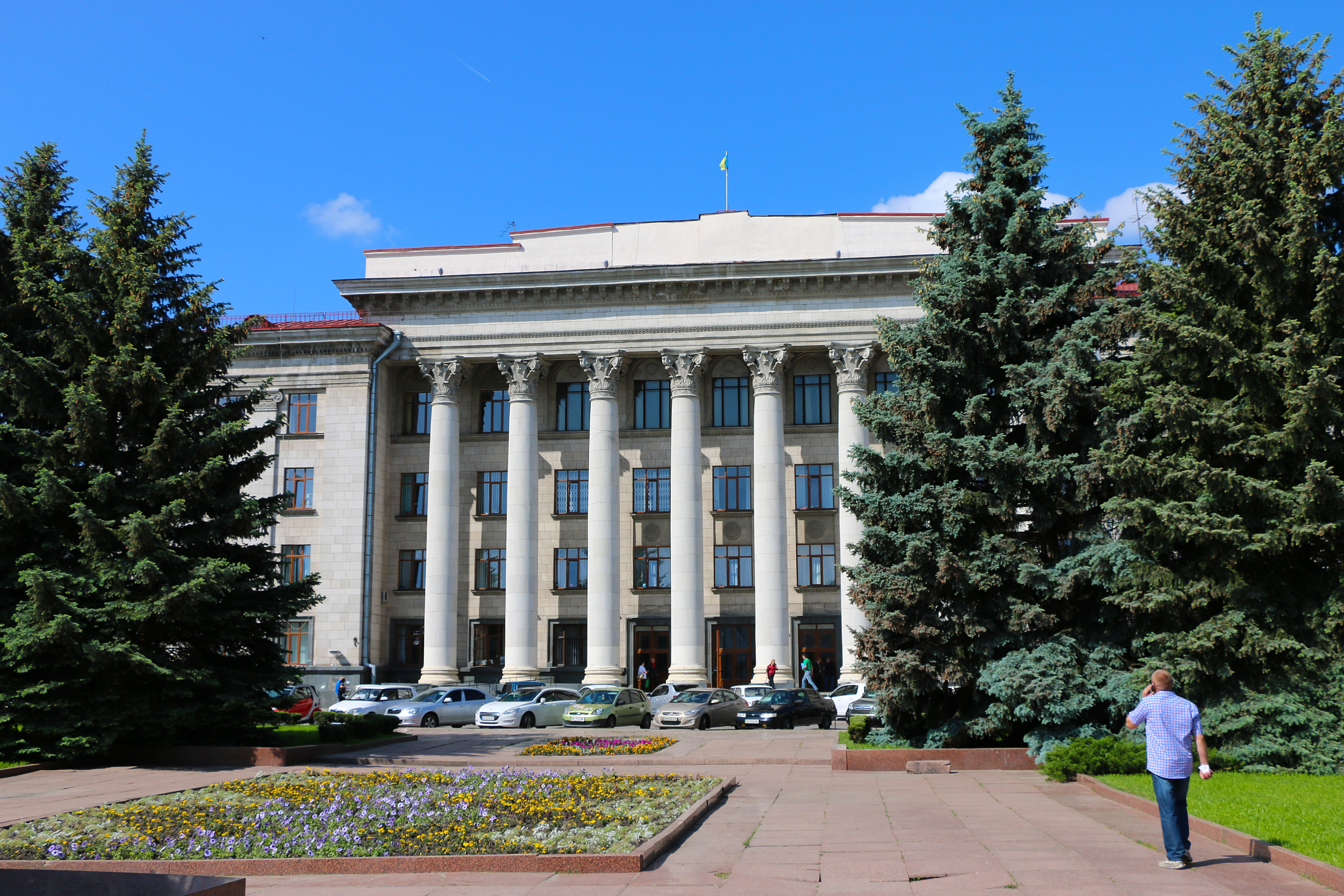
Zhytomyr Regional Administration

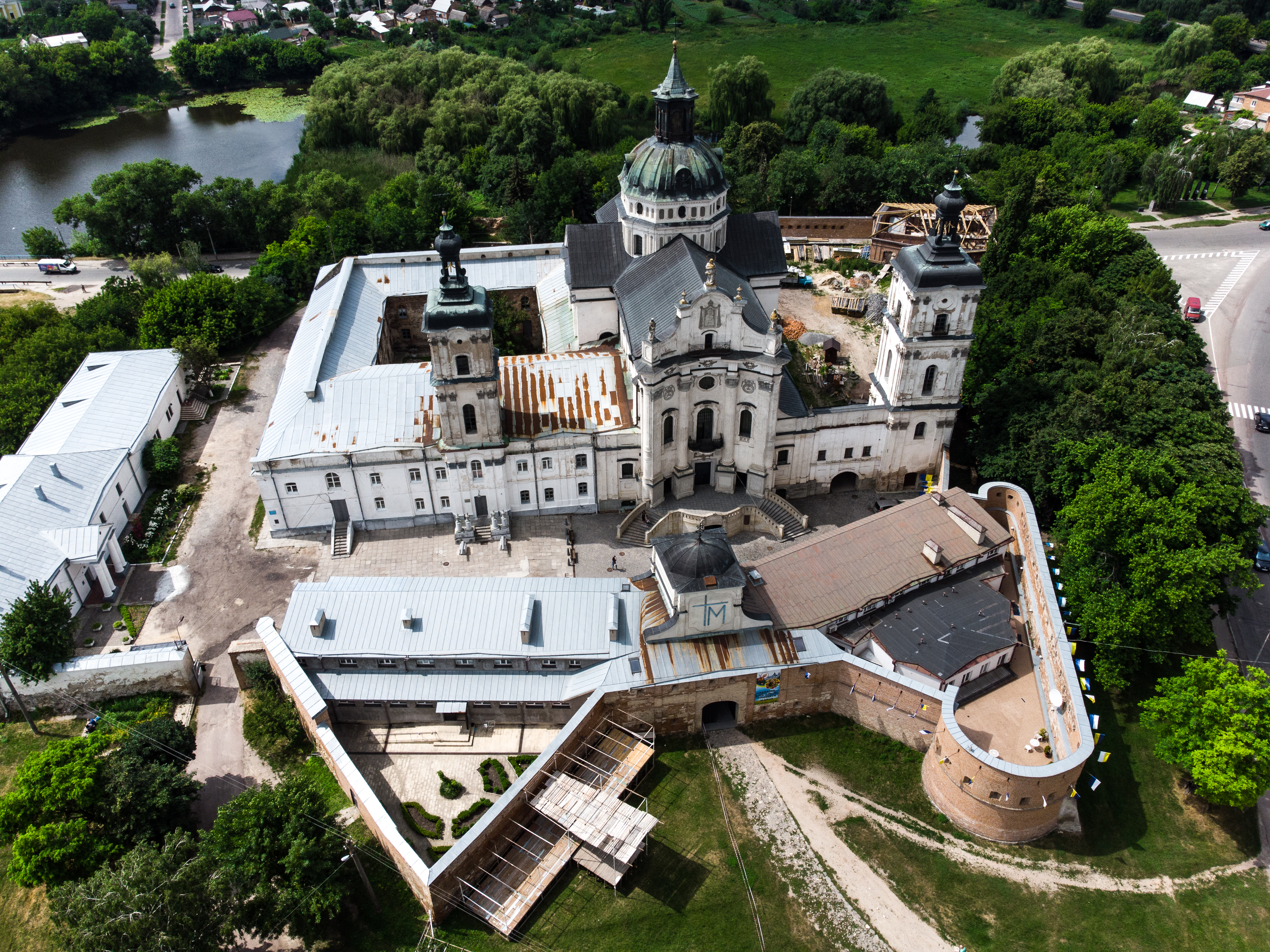
Carmelite Monastery in Berdychiv

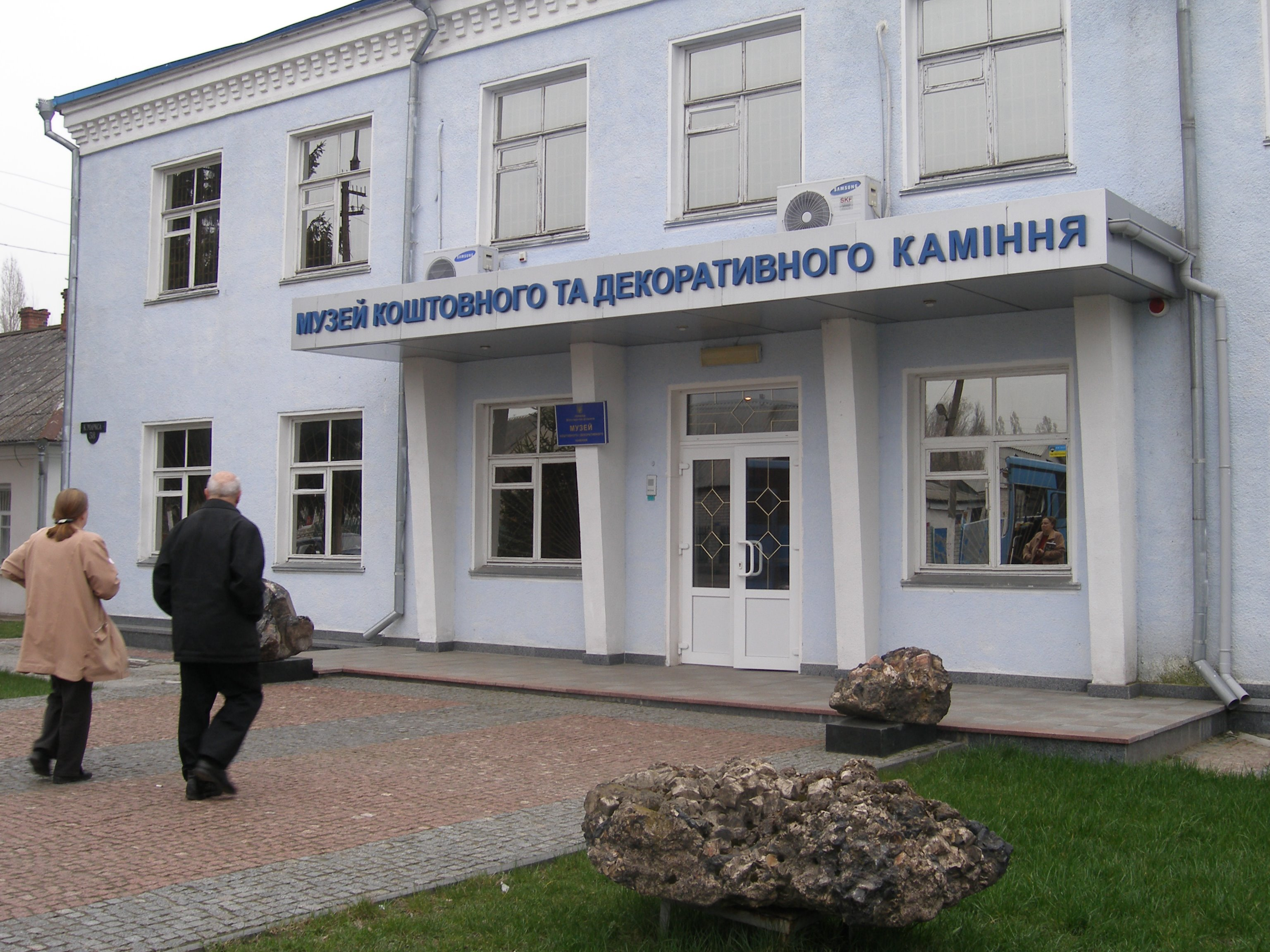
Mineralogical museum in Khoroshiv

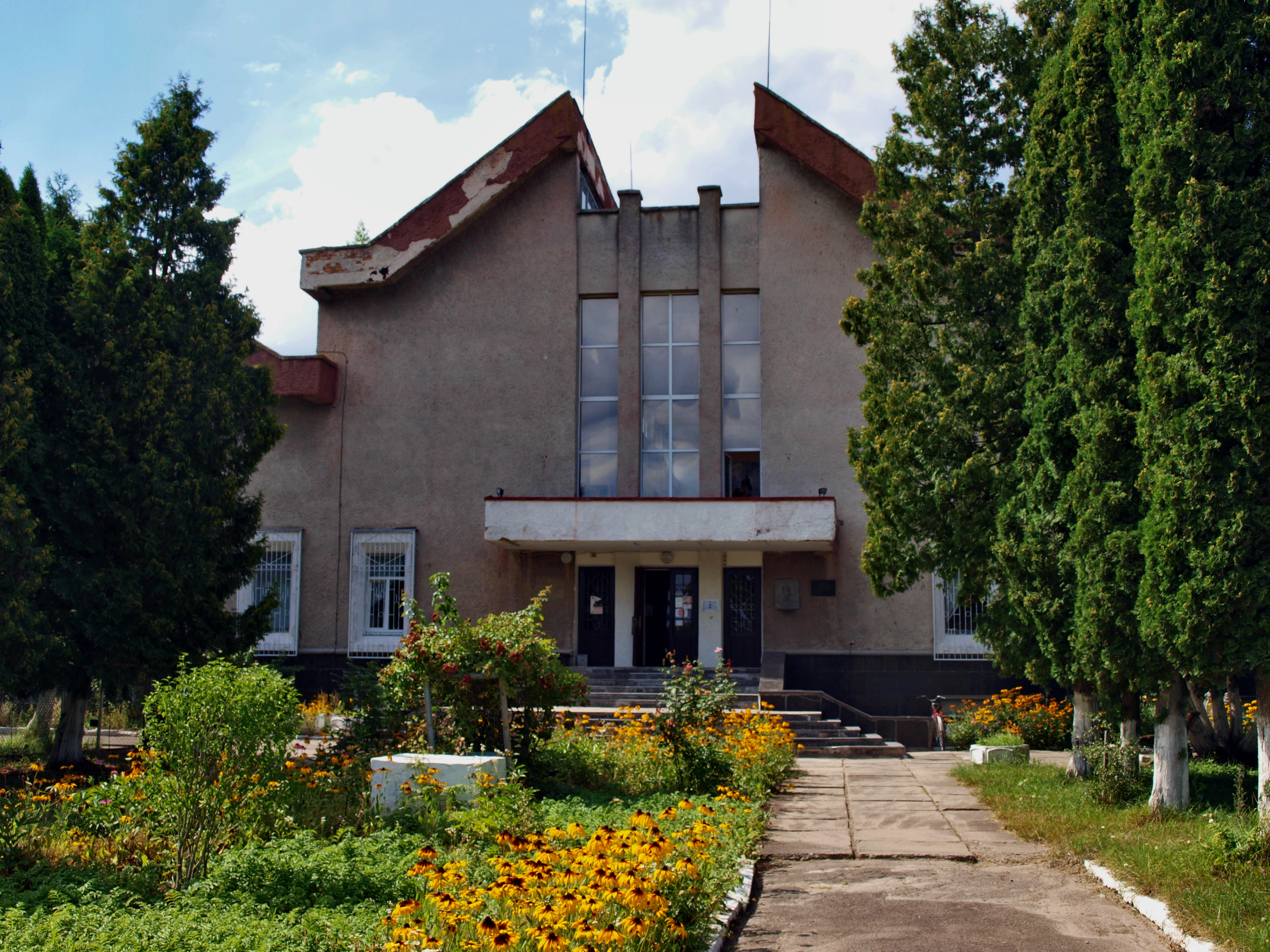
Art museum in Kmytiv

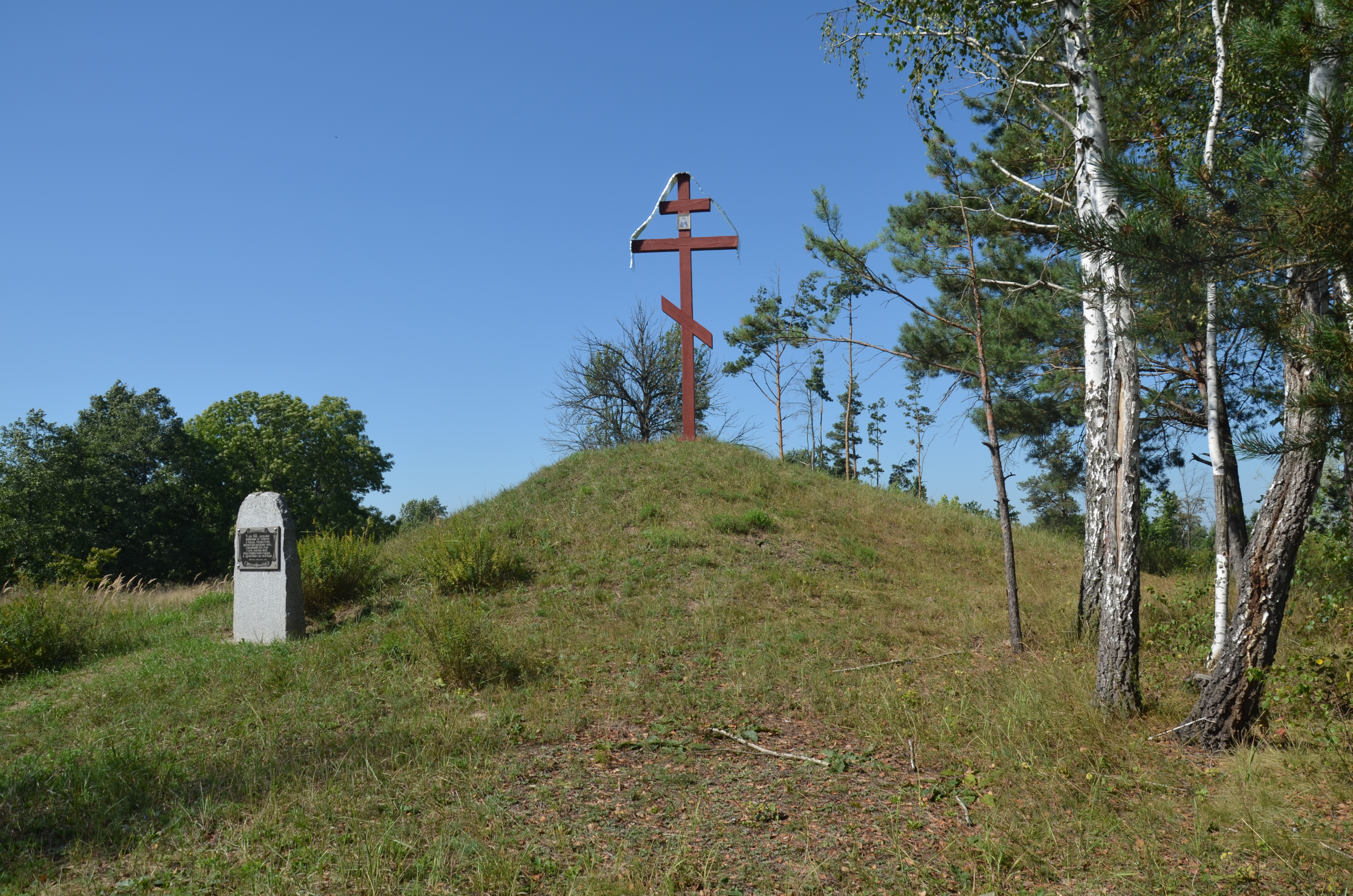
Kurgan in Nemyrivka

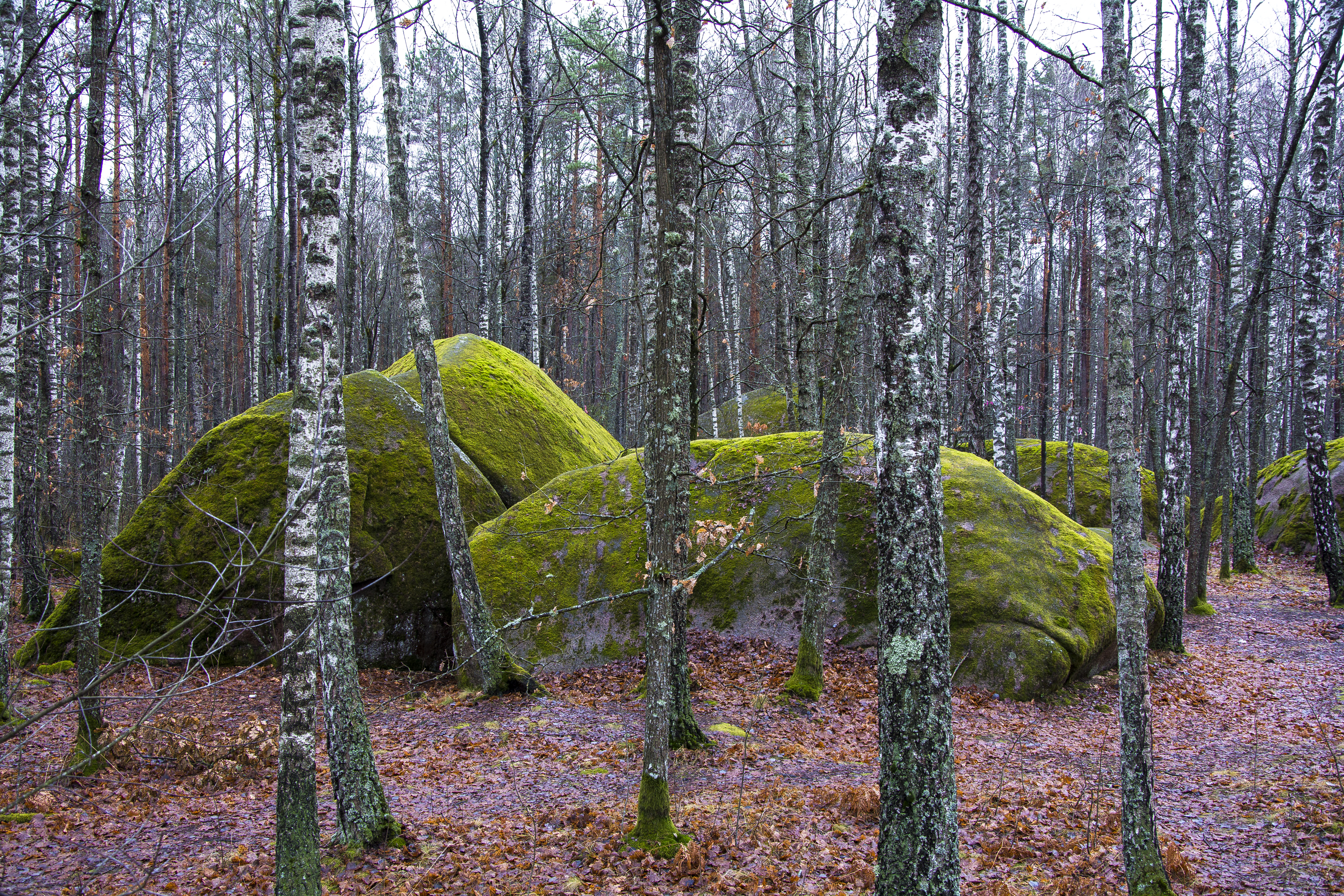
Stone Village
