= Administrative divisions of Zhytomyr Oblast =

Zhytomyr Oblast is subdivided into districts (raions) which are subdivided into municipalities (hromadas).

== Current ==
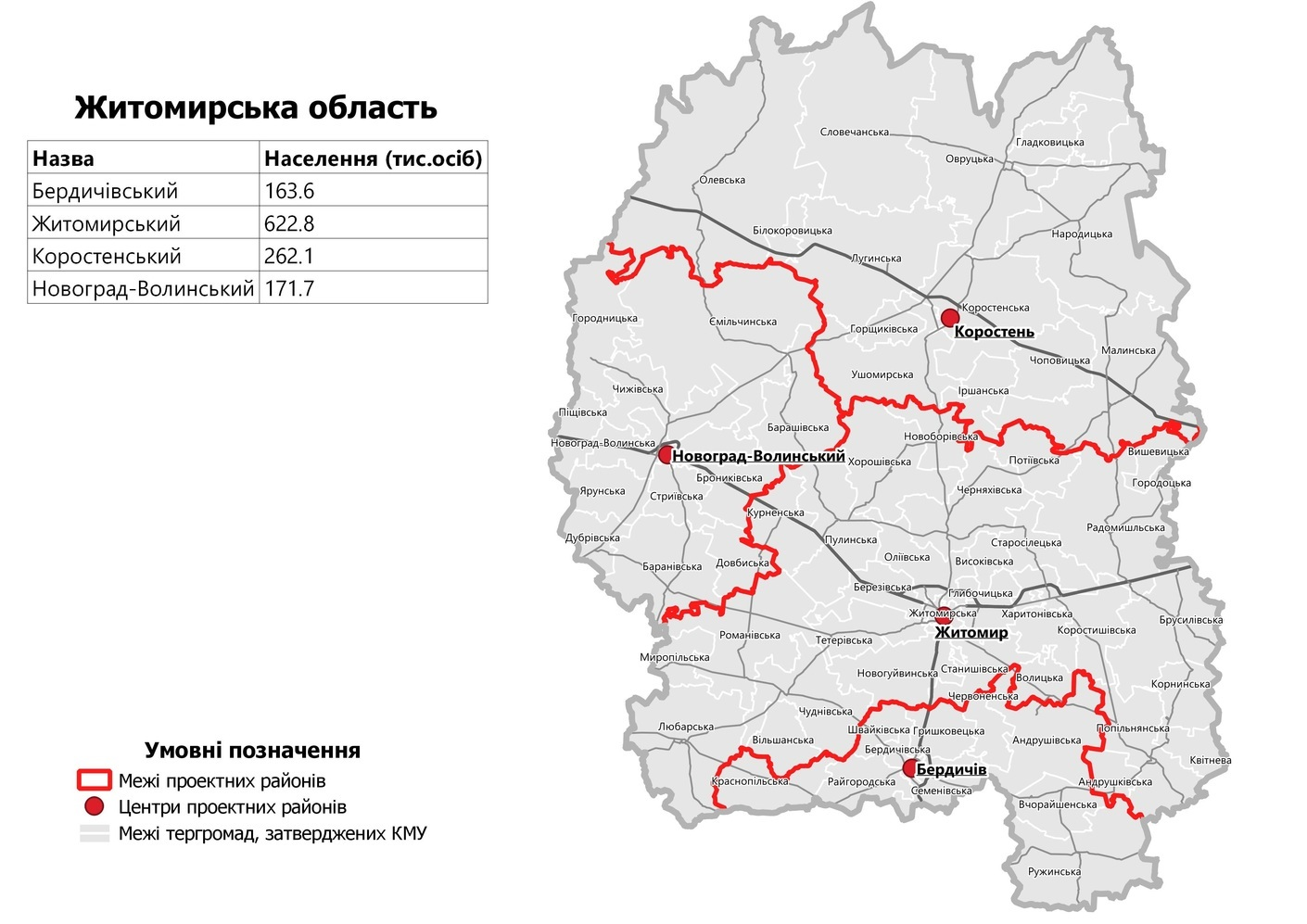
Raions of Zhytomyr Oblast as of August 2020.

On 18 July 2020, the number of districts was reduced to four. These are:

1. Berdychiv (Бердичівський район), the center is in the town of Berdychiv;
2. Korosten (Коростенський район), the center is in the town of Korosten;
3. Zhytomyr (Житомирський район), the center is in the city of Zhytomyr;
4. Zviahel (Звягельський район), formerly Novohrad-Volynskyi Raion, the center is in the town of Zviahel.

**Zhytomyr Oblast**
As of January 1, 2022
Number of districts (raions)	4
Number of municipalities (hromadas)	66

=== Communities (hromadas) per Raion ===
In bold are communities (hromadas) with cities

Bedyrchiv Raion

- **Andrushivka**
- **Berdychiv**
- Chervone
- Hryshkivtsi
- Krasnopil
- Raihorodok
- Ruzhyn
- Semenivka
- Shvaikivka
- Vchoraishe

Korosten Raion

- Bilokorovychi
- Chopovychi
- Hladkovychi
- Horshchyk
- Irshansk
- **Korosten**
- Luhyny
- **Malyn**
- Narodychi
- **Ovruch**
- **Olevsk**
- Slovechne
- Ushomyr

Zhytomyr Raion

- Andrushky
- Berezivka
- Brusyliv
- Cherniakhiv
- **Chudniv**
- Hlybochytsia
- Horodok
- Kharytonivka
- Khoroshiv
- Kornyn
- **Korostyshiv**
- Kurne
- Kvitneve
- Liubar
- Myropil
- Nova Borova
- Novohuivynske
- Oliivka
- Popilnia
- Potiivka
- Pulyny
- **Radomyshl**
- Romaniv
- Stanyshivka
- Starosiltsi
- Teterivka
- Vysoke
- Vyshevychi
- Vilshanka
- Volytsia
- **Zhytomyr**

Zviahel Raion

- **Baranivka**
- Barashi
- Bronyky
- Chyzhivka
- Dovbysh
- Dubrivka
- Horodnytsia
- Pishchiv
- Stryieva
- Yarun
- Yemilchyne
- **Zviahel**

Notes:

- Portions of the Korosten Raion (north-east), in particular those located on the territory of the Ovruch and Narodychi communities, are administered by the Chernobyl Exclusion Zone administration.

== Administrative divisions until 2020 ==
=== Original composition ===
Zhytomyr Oblast was created in 1937 and was subdivided into 30 districts (raions) and 4 cities of oblast subordination. Upon its formation, Zhytomyr Oblast encompassed districts (raions) transferred from Kyiv Oblast (3 cities and 26 districts) and Vinnytsia Oblast (1 city and 4 districts).

- Cities of the oblast's subordination:
  - Berdychiv (Бердичів, Вінницької області)
  - Korosten (Коростень, Київської області)
  - Novohrad-Volynskyi (Новоград-Волинський, Київської області)
  - Zhytomyr (Житомир, Київської області)
- Districts (raions, A–L):
  - Andrushivka Raion (Андрушівський район, Київської області)
  - Baranivka Raion (Баранівський район, Київської області)
  - Barashi Raion (Барашівський район, Київської області)
  - Bazar Raion (Базарський район, Київської області)
  - Brusyliv Raion (Брусилівський район, Київської області)
  - Cherniakhiv Raion (Черняхівський район, Київської області)
  - Chervonoarmiysk Raion (Червоноармійський район, Київської області)
  - Chopovychi Raion (Чоповицький район, Київської області)
  - Chudniv Raion (Чуднівський район, Вінницької області)
  - Emilchyne Raion (Емільчинський район, Київської області)
  - Horodnytsia Raion (Городницький район, Київської області)
  - Kornyn Raion (Корнинський район, Київської області)
  - Korostyshiv Raion (Коростишівський район, Київської області)
  - Liubar Raion (Любарський район, Вінницької області)
  - Luhyny Raion (Лугинський район, Київської області)
- Districts (raions, M–Y):
  - Malyn Raion (Малинський район, Київської області)
  - Narodychi Raion (Народицький район, Київської області)
  - Olevsk Raion (Олевський район, Київської області)
  - Ovruch Raion (Овруцький район, Київської області)
  - Popilnia Raion (Попільнянський район, Київської області)
  - Potiivka Raion (Потіївський район, Київської області)
  - Radomyshl Raion (Радомишльський район, Київської області)
  - Dzerzhynsk Raion (Дзержинський район, Вінницької області)
  - Ruzhyn Raion (Ружинський район, Київської області)
  - Slovechne Raion (Словечанський район, Київської області)
  - Troyaniv Raion (Троянівський район, Київської області)
  - Vchoraisha Raion (Вчорайшанський район, Київської області)
  - Volodarsko-Volynsk Raion (Володарсько-Волинський район, Київської області)
  - Yanushpil Raion (Янушпільський район, Вінницької області)
  - Yarun Raion (Ярунський район, Київської області)

=== Later composition ===
Raions of Zhytomyr Oblast as of June 2020. The city of Zhytomyr is shown in dark blue.

In 2020, Zhytomyr Oblast was subdivided into 28 regions: 23 districts (raions) and 5 city municipalities (mis'krada or misto), officially known as territories governed by city councils.

- Cities under the oblast's jurisdiction:
  - Zhytomyr (Житомир), the administrative center of the oblast
  - Berdychiv (Бердичів)
  - Korosten (Коростень)
  - Malyn (Малин)
  - Novohrad-Volynskyi (Новоград-Волинський)
- Districts (raions):
  - Andrushivka (Андрушівський район)
    - Cities and towns under the district's jurisdiction:
      - Andrushivka (Андрушівка)
    - Urban-type settlements under the district's jurisdiction:
      - Chervone (Червоне)
  - Baranivka (Баранівський район)
    - Cities and towns under the district's jurisdiction:
      - Baranivka (Баранівка)
    - Urban-type settlements under the district's jurisdiction:
      - Dovbysh (Довбиш)
      - Kamianyi Brid (Кам'яний Брід)
      - Maryanivka (Мар'янівка)
      - Pershotravensk (Першотравенськ)
      - Polianka (Полянка)
  - Berdychiv (Бердичівський район)
    - Urban-type settlements under the district's jurisdiction:
      - Hryshkivtsi (Гришківці)
  - Brusyliv (Брусилівський район)
    - Urban-type settlements under the district's jurisdiction:
      - Brusyliv (Брусилів)
  - Cherniakhiv (Черняхівський район)
    - Urban-type settlements under the district's jurisdiction:
      - Cherniakhiv (Черняхів)
      - Holovyne (Головине)
  - Chudniv (Чуднівський район)
    - Cities and towns under the district's jurisdiction:
      - Chudniv (Чуднів)
    - Urban-type settlements under the district's jurisdiction:
      - Ivanopil (Іванопіль)
      - Vakulenchuk (Вакуленчук)
      - Velyki Korovyntsi (Великі Коровинці)
  - Khoroshiv (Володарсько-Волинський район), formerly Volodarsk-Volynskyi Raion
    - Urban-type settlements under the district's jurisdiction:
      - Irshansk (Іршанськ)
      - Khoroshiv (Хорошiв)
      - Nova Borova (Нова Борова)
  - Korosten (Коростенський район)
  - Korostyshiv (Коростишівський район)
    - Cities and towns under the district's jurisdiction:
      - Korostyshiv (Коростишів)
  - Liubar (Любарський район)
    - Urban-type settlements under the district's jurisdiction:
      - Liubar (Любар)
  - Luhyny (Лугинський район)
    - Urban-type settlements under the district's jurisdiction:
      - Luhyny (Лугини)
      - Myroliubiv (Миролюбів), formerly Zhovtneve
  - Malyn (Малинський район)
    - Urban-type settlements under the district's jurisdiction:
      - Chopovychi (Чоповичі)
      - Hranitne (Гранітне)
  - Narodychi (Народицький район)
    - Urban-type settlements under the district's jurisdiction:
      - Narodychi (Народичі)
  - Novohrad-Volynskyi (Новоград-Волинський район)
    - Urban-type settlements under the district's jurisdiction:
      - Horodnytsia (Городниця)
  - Olevsk (Олевський район)
    - Cities and towns under the district's jurisdiction:
      - Olevsk (Олевськ)
    - Urban-type settlements under the district's jurisdiction:
      - Buchmany (Бучмани)
      - Dibrova (Діброва)
      - Druzhba (Дружба)
      - Novi Bilokorovychi (Нові Білокоровичі)
      - Novoozerianka (Новоозерянка)
  - Ovruch (Овруцький район)
    - Cities and towns under the district's jurisdiction:
      - Ovruch (Овруч)
    - Urban-type settlements under the district's jurisdiction:
      - Pershotravneve (Першотравневе)
  - Popilnia (Попільнянський район)
    - Urban-type settlements under the district's jurisdiction:
      - Kornyn (Корнин)
      - Popilnia (Попільня)
  - Pulyny (Пулинський район), formerly Chervonoarmiisk Raion
    - Urban-type settlements under the district's jurisdiction:
      - Pulyny (Пулини), formerly Chervonoarmiisk
  - Radomyshl (Радомишльський район)
    - Cities and towns under the district's jurisdiction:
      - Radomyshl (Радомишль)
    - Urban-type settlements under the district's jurisdiction:
      - Bila Krynytsia (Біла Криниця)
      - Horodok (Городок)
  - Romaniv (Романівський район)
    - Urban-type settlements under the district's jurisdiction:
      - Bykivka (Биківка)
      - Myropil (Миропіль)
      - Romaniv (Романів)
  - Ruzhyn (Ружинський район)
    - Urban-type settlements under the district's jurisdiction:
      - Ruzhyn (Ружин)
  - Yemilchyne (Ємільчинський район)
    - Urban-type settlements under the district's jurisdiction:
      - Yablunets (Яблунець)
      - Yemilchyne (Ємільчине)
  - Zhytomyr (Житомирський район)
    - Urban-type settlements under the district's jurisdiction:
      - Huiva (Гуйва)
      - Novohuivynske (Новогуйвинське)
      - Ozerne (Озерне)
