= List of cities in Zhytomyr Oblast =

Location of cities in Zhytomyr Oblast

There are 12 populated places in Zhytomyr Oblast, Ukraine, that have been officially granted city status (Ukrainian: місто, romanized: misto) by the Verkhovna Rada, the country's parliament. Settlements with more than 10,000 people are eligible for city status, although the status is typically also granted to settlements of historical or regional importance. As of 5 December 2001, the date of the first and only official census in the country since independence, (Note: As of 11 July 2023) the most populous city in the oblast was the regional capital, Zhytomyr, with a population of 284,236 people, while the least populous city was Chudniv, with 6,558 people.

From independence in 1991 to 2020, five cities in the oblast were designated as cities of regional significance (municipalities), which had self-government under city councils, while the oblast's remaining seven cities were located amongst twenty-three raions (districts) as cities of district significance, which are subordinated to the governments of the raions. On 18 July 2020, an administrative reform abolished and merged the oblast's raions and cities of regional significance into four new, expanded raions. The four raions that make up the oblast are Berdychiv, Korosten, Zhytomyr, and Zviahel.

== List of cities ==
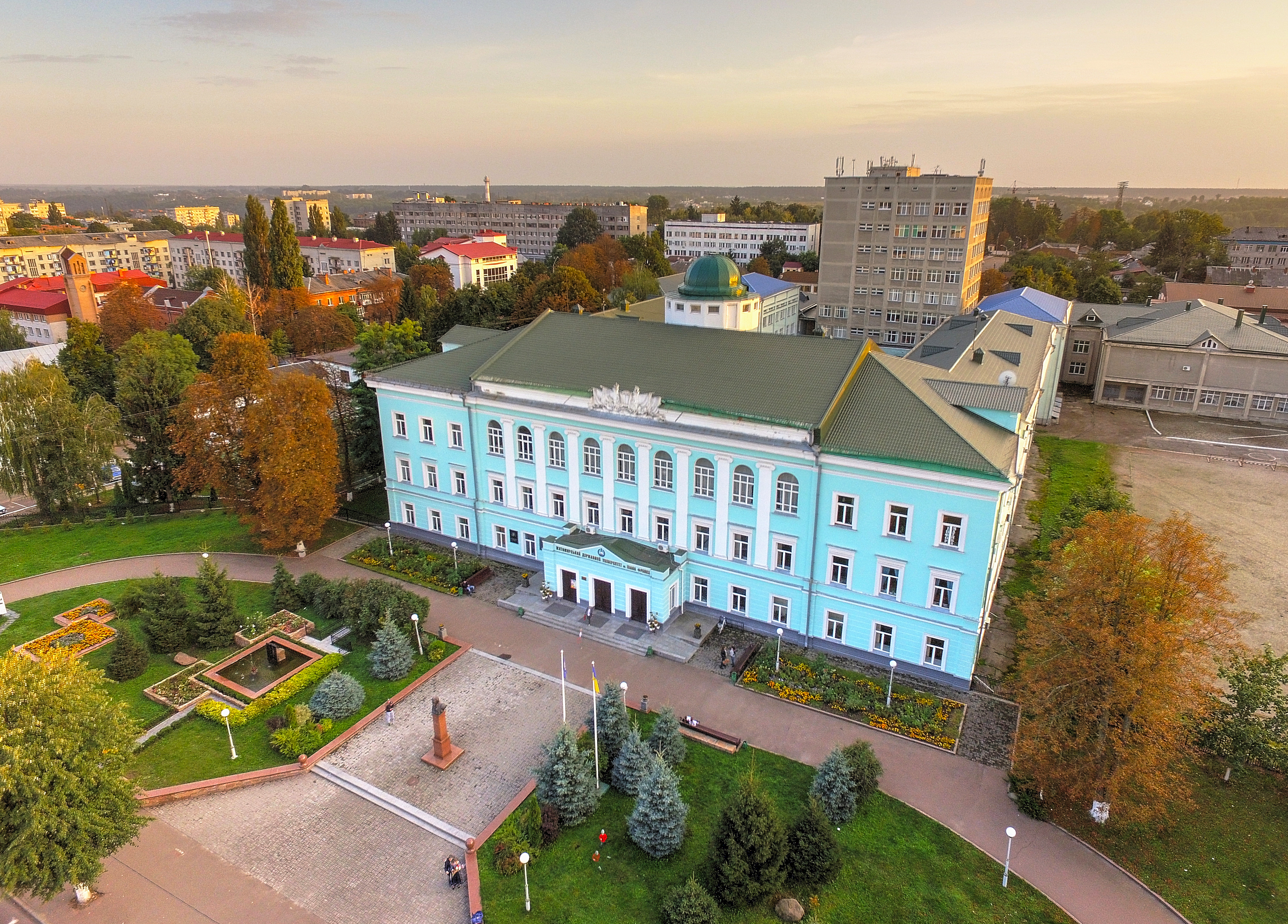
Zhytomyr, capital and most populous city in Zhytomyr Oblast

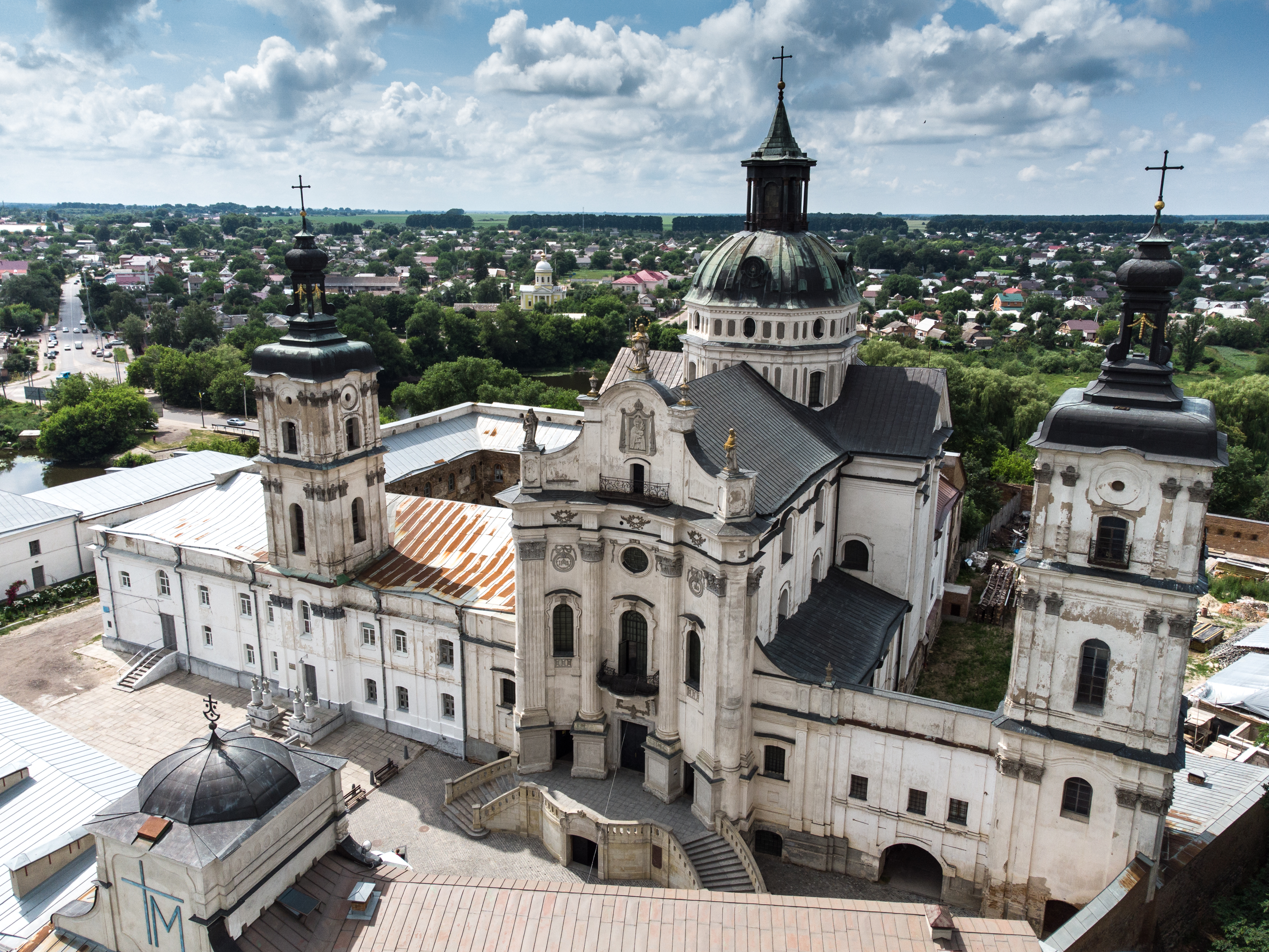
Berdychiv, second most populous city in the oblast and a former Jewish center

Cities in Zhytomyr Oblast
| Name | Name (in Ukrainian) (Note: Links to the Ukrainian Wikipedia articles for each city) | Raion (district) | Population (2022 estimates) | Population (2001 census) | Population change |
|---|---|---|---|---|---|
| Andrushivka | Андрушівка | Berdychiv | 8,325 | 9,890 | −15.82% |
| Baranivka | Баранівка | Zviahel | 11,161 | 12,584 | −11.31% |
| Berdychiv | Бердичів | Berdychiv | 73,046 | 87,575 | −16.59% |
| Chudniv | Чуднів | Zhytomyr | 5,357 | 6,558 | −18.31% |
| Korosten | Коростень | Korosten | 61,496 | 66,669 | −7.76% |
| Korostyshiv | Коростишів | Zhytomyr | 24,129 | 26,068 | −7.44% |
| Malyn | Малин | Korosten | 25,172 | 28,113 | −10.46% |
| Olevsk | Олевськ | Korosten | 10,032 | 10,896 | −7.93% |
| Ovruch | Овруч | Korosten | 15,250 | 17,031 | −10.46% |
| Radomyshl | Радомишль | Zhytomyr | 13,685 | 15,326 | −10.71% |
| Zhytomyr | Житомир | Zhytomyr | 261,624 | 284,236 | −7.96% |
| Zviahel | Звягель | Zviahel | 55,086 | 56,259 | −2.08% |

== See also ==
- List of cities in Ukraine
