= Kruchenets =

Settlement in Zhytomyr Oblast, Ukraine

Kruchenets Крученець
- Settlement

Kruchenets' transcription(s)
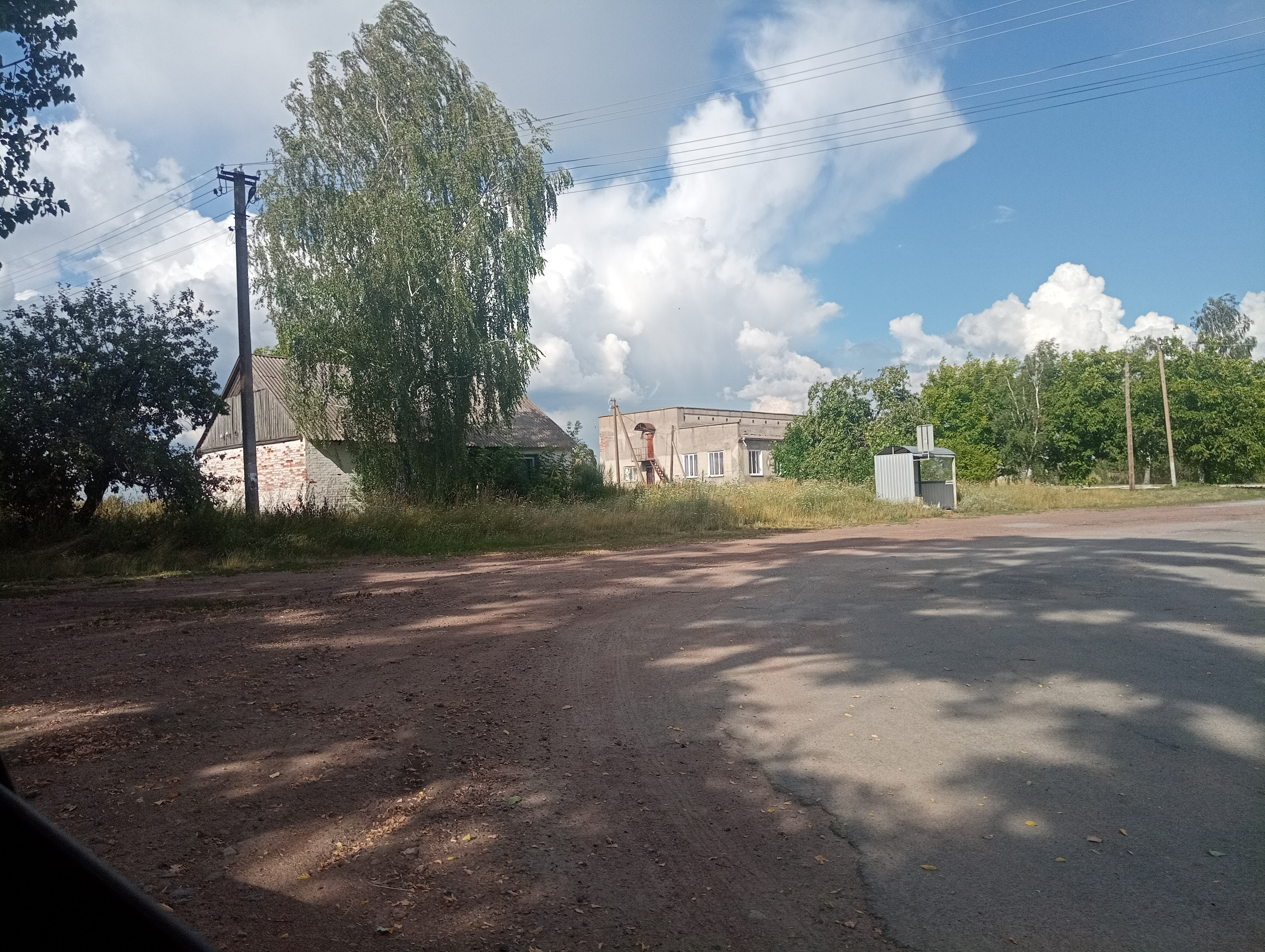
- Center of Kruchenets in 2026.

- Location within Ukraine
- Coordinates: 50.47°N 28.50°E
- Country: Ukraine
- Oblast: Zhytomyr Oblast
- Raion: Zhytomyr Raion
- Hromada: Oliivka territorial hromada

Area
  - Total: 1.28 km^{2} (0.49 sq mi)
- Elevation: 232 m (761 ft)

Population (2001)
  - Total: 251

Kruchenets is a settlement in Ukraine. It is located in the Oliivka hromada within Zhytomyr Raion in the oblast with the same name.

== History ==
The settlement was founded in 1634.

In the book of Mykola I. Teodorovych, titled "History of the Statistical Description of the Churches and Arrivals of the Volyn Eparchy" on page 88, it indicates that the settlement of Kruchenets was appointed to the Novopilska Church built in 1860.

In 1911, the Kruchenets initial settlement school was opened, and the settlement at that time belonged to the Pulynsky volost. In the school, 4 teachers taught 65 students, of which 28 were boys and 27 were girls.

From 1923 to 1954, Kruchenets was the seat of the Kruchenets village council in the former Cherniakhiv Raion.

On September 7, 2016, the village became part of the Vilsk territorial hromada. On April 15, 2020, the Cabinet of Ministers of Ukraine approved a plan to form newer hromadas in Zhytomyr Oblast, resulting in Kruchenets becoming part of the Oliivka territorial hromada on June 12 of the same year.

== Population and ethnicity ==
The population of Kruchenets as of 2001 is 251 residents, consisting of 248 Ukrainian people (98.8%) and 3 Russians (1.2%). The same statistics are with languages, i. e. 248 people speaking Ukrainian, and the other 3 residents speaking Russian.
