= Cherniakhiv =

Cherniakhiv or Chernyakhiv (Ukrainian: Черняхів) may refer to several places in Ukraine;

- Cherniakhiv, Kyiv Oblast, a village in Obukhiv Raion, Kyiv Oblast
- Cherniakhiv, Rivne Oblast, a village in Ostroh Raion, Rivne Oblast
- Cherniakhiv, Zhytomyr Oblast, a town (urban-type settlement) in Cherniakhiv Raion, Zhytomyr Oblast
- Cherniakhiv Raion, Zhytomyr Oblast

== See also ==
- Cherniakhiv culture or Chernyakhov culture, historic archaeological culture around the village of Cherniakhiv, Kyiv Oblast
- Chernyakhovsk, a city of Kaliningrad Oblast (historic Eastern Prussia) named after Ivan Chernyakhovsky
