= Pulyny Raion =

Former subdivision of Zhytomyr Oblast, Ukraine

Pulyny Raion Пулинський район
- Raion
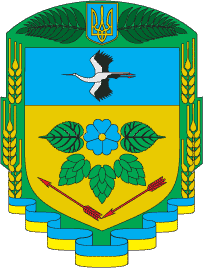
- Flag Coat of arms

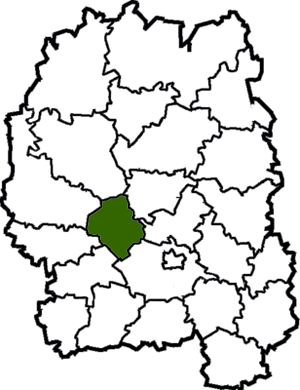
- Coordinates: 50°28′28″N 28°16′32″E
- Country: Ukraine
- Oblast: Zhytomyr Oblast
- Disestablished: 18 July 2020
- Admin. center: Pulyny
- Subdivisions: List: 0 — city councils; 1 — settlement councils; — rural councils; Number of localities: 0 — cities; 1 — urban-type settlements; — villages; — rural settlements

Area
  - Total: 853 km^{2} (329 sq mi)

Population (2020)
  - Total: 22,193 ▼
  - Density: 26.0/km^{2} (67.4/sq mi)
- Time zone: UTC+02:00 (EET)
  - Summer (DST): UTC+03:00 (EEST)
- Area code: +380

Pulyny Raion (Ukrainian: Пулинський район) was a raion (district) of Zhytomyr Oblast, northern Ukraine. Its administrative centre was located at Pulyny. The raion covered an area of 853 square kilometres (329 mi^{2}). It was originally known as Chervonoarmiisk Raion (Ukrainian: Червоноармійський район) but on 19 May 2016, the Verkhovna Rada decided to rename it to Pulyny Raion according to the law prohibiting names of Communist origin.

The raion was abolished on 18 July 2020 as part of the administrative reform of Ukraine, which reduced the number of raions of Zhytomyr Oblast to four. The area of Pulyny Raion was merged into Zhytomyr Raion. The last estimate of the raion's population was 22,193 (2020 est.)
