= Polianka =

Polianka or Polyanka may refer to:

- Polianka, Slovakia
- Polianka (rural settlement), Ukraine
- Polyanka (Moscow Metro), a station
