= Maksyuta =

Maksyuta or Maksiuta (Cyrillic: Максюта) is an East Slavic surname that may refer to

- Anatoliy Maksyuta (born 1963), Ukrainian politician
- Nikolay Maksyuta (1947–2021), Russian politician
- Valeria Maksyuta (born 1987), Ukrainian-Israeli artistic gymnast
- Victoria Maksyuta (born 1981), Ukrainian figure skater
