= Anatoliy Maksyuta =

Ukrainian bureaucrat (born 1963)

Anatoliy Maksyuta Ukrainian: Анатолій Аркадійович Максюта

deputy Minister of Economic Development and Trade of Ukraine
- In office April 5, 2012 – October 16, 2014
- Prime Minister: Mykola Azarov
- Preceded by: Vadym Kopylov

Personal details
- Born: 15 June 1963 (age 63) Kozachky, Letychiv Raion, Khmelnytskyi Oblast, Ukrainian SSR
- Education: Ternopil National Economic University

Anatoliy Arkadiyovych Maksyuta (Ukrainian: Анатолій Аркадійович Максюта; born June 15, 1963) is a Ukrainian statesman and former deputy Minister of Economic Development and Trade of Ukraine (since April 5, 2012).

== Biography ==
=== Early life and education ===
Anatoliy Maksyuta was born in Kozachky (Letychiv Raion, Khmelnytskyi Oblast, Ukrainian SSR).

In 1984 he graduated from the Ternopil Finance and Economics Institute (specialty - "Finance and Credit", qualification "Economist"). In 1994 Anatoliy Maksyuta graduated from the Institute of Public Administration and Local Self-Government under the Cabinet of Ukraine (specialty "State Government", qualification "Master of Public Administration").

=== Career ===
==== Activities in local self-government ====
- 1984–1984: senior economist (Finance Department of Executive Committee of Cherniakhiv Raion Council of People's Deputies, Zhytomyr oblast).
- 1984–1986: served in the Soviet Army.
- 1986–1987: economist, deputy chairman - chairman of Inspection of government revenue (Finance Department of Executive Committee of Cherniakhiv Raion Council of People's Deputies, Zhytomyr oblast).
- 1987–1988: chairman of the department of comprehensive economic and social development (Executive Committee of Cherniakhiv Raion Council of People's Deputies, Zhytomyr oblast).
- 1988–1990: chairman of the financial department of the (Executive Committee of Luhyny Raion Council of People's Deputies, Zhytomyr oblast).
- 1990–1993: deputy chairman of the Budget Division of Financial Management (Executive Committee of Zhytomyr Oblast Council of People's Deputies).
- 1993–1993: deputy chairman - chairman of Finance of the local economy, money and securities financial management (Executive Committee of Zhytomyr Oblast Council of People's Deputies).

==== Government activities ====
- 1993–1994: student of the Institute of Public Administration and Local Self-Government under the Cabinet of Ukraine.
- 1994–1995: deputy chairman of General Budget Department - chairman of regional budgets section.
- 1995–1996: chairman of General Budget Department, a member of the Ministry of Finance of Ukraine board.
- 1996–1997: first deputy chairman of the General Budget Department (Ministry of Finance of Ukraine).
- 1997–2000: chairman of General Budget Department (Ministry of Finance of Ukraine).
- 2000–2001: chairman of the Department of Budget (Ministry of Finance of Ukraine).
- 2001–2002: deputy State Secretary (Ministry of Finance of Ukraine).
- 2002–2003: State Secretary (Ministry of Finance of Ukraine).
- 2003–2003: deputy State Secretary (Ministry of Finance of Ukraine).
- 2003–2005: advisor of the President of Ukraine.
- 2005–2005: deputy Minister of Finance of Ukraine.
- 2005–2007, 2008–2011: first deputy Minister of Economy of Ukraine.
- 2011–2012: advisor of the President of Ukraine - chairman of the Department of social area reforming in Presidential Administration of Ukraine.
- Since April 5, 2012 - first Deputy Minister of Economic Development and Trade of Ukraine.
- Since September 27, 2012 - chairman of the Scientific and Technical Council of the Ministry of Economic Development and Trade of Ukraine.
- Since January 30, 2013 - coordinator from Ukraine in the implementation of the EU Strategy for the Danube Region.
- On 16 October 2014 he was dismissed as Deputy Minister of Economic Development and Trade.

== State awards ==
- Honor Diploma of the Cabinet of Ukraine (1999)
- Merited Economist of Ukraine (2008)
