= Motovylivka, Zhytomyr Oblast =

Motovylivka Мотовилівка
- Village
- Location of Motovylivka in Ukraine Motovylivka (Ukraine)
- Coordinates: 49°48′36″N 27°47′44″E
- Country: Ukraine
- Oblast: Zhytomyr Oblast
- Raion: Zhytomyr Raion
- First Settled: 1601

Area
  - Total: 28.535 km^{2} (11.017 sq mi)
- Elevation: 268 m (879 ft)

Population
  - Total: 929

Motovylivka (Ukrainian: Мотовилівка) is a village in Zhytomyr Raion, Zhytomyr Oblast, Ukraine.

Until 18 July 2020, Motovylivka was located in Liubar Raion. The raion was abolished in July 2020 as part of the administrative reform of Ukraine, which reduced the number of raions of Zhytomyr Oblast to four. The area of Liubar Raion was merged into Zhytomyr Raion.
