= Motovylivka =

Motovylivka (Ukrainian: Мотовилівка) may refer to the following places in Ukraine:

- Motovylivka, Kyiv Oblast, village in Fastiv Raion
- Motovylivka, Zhytomyr Oblast, village in Liubar Raion
