= Poshtove =

Poshtove (Поштове) may refer to the following places in Ukraine:

- Poshtove, Crimea
- Poshtove, Zhytomyr Oblast
