= Joseph Dzhun =

Ukrainian astronomer (born 1940)

- Born: 13 July 1940 (age 86); Cherniakhiv, Zhytomyr Oblast, Soviet Union
- Education: National University "Lviv Polytechnic"
- Known for: the creation of non-classical theory of errors and the development of non-classical information processing procedures
- Awards: awarded by the medal "For military prowess"
- Scientific career
- Fields: mathematics, mathematical processing of astronomical, space and large amounts of statistical information
- Workplaces: Head of Mathematical Modelling Department, Faculty of Cybernetics, IUEH

Joseph Dzhun Volodymyrovych is a Ukrainian scientist, astronomer, and academician who was born in Cherniakhiv, Zhytomyr, Ukraine. He graduated from Lviv Polytechnical Institute.

He is a scientist-astronomer, mathematician, representative of an academician E.P. Fedorov's scientific school, doctor of physical and mathematical sciences, professor of the mathematical modelling department of the cybernetics faculty of International University of Economics and Humanities (IUEH), full member of the International Pedagogical Academy (Moscow, 1999), and European Safety Association (2002).

== Scientific work ==
Dzhun specialises in mathematical astronomy, space, and statistical information processing of high volumes, especially in connection with Hempel's Paradox. Dzhun's scientific works are devoted to the development of astrometry. He carried out the fundamental control of the Cambridge professor H. Jeffreys' conclusions about the nonclassical form of the errors distribution law for the sample of the volume of more than 500 observations, which confirmed Jeffreys' conception about the correspondence of the VII type Pearson's distribution real errors.

Dzhun performed large scale research on the histograms of the errors of astronomic, gravimetrical, geophysical and economic data in total volume more than 170,000 observations, using the most high-quality series, including the F.V. Bessel historical series.

The basic ideas and approaches are stated in Dzhun's doctoral thesis "Mathematical Processing of Astronomic and Space Information in case of the Non-Gauss Observation Errors," presented in 1992. His scientific works are devoted mainly to different aspects of the nonclassical theory of errors development, studying of its axiomatic foundations and creation of the adapted procedures at mathematical modelling and data analysis. He developed the analytical theory of the weight functions and the method of the mathematical models diagnostics on its base.

Dzhun is the first to theorize that the relative random vibrations of the major index series in global economy submitted to the VII type Pearson's distribution.

He created the theory of informative methods of evaluation of astronomical observations accuracy in case of the non-Gauss errors distribution.

Dzhun proposed to substitute the fundamental principle of the Gauss maximal weight by the Fisher principle of a maximum of information with the purpose of evolution and generalization of the procedures of the least-squares classic method.
