= Holovyne =

Rural locality in Zhytomyr Oblast, Ukraine

Holovyne Головине
- Rural settlement
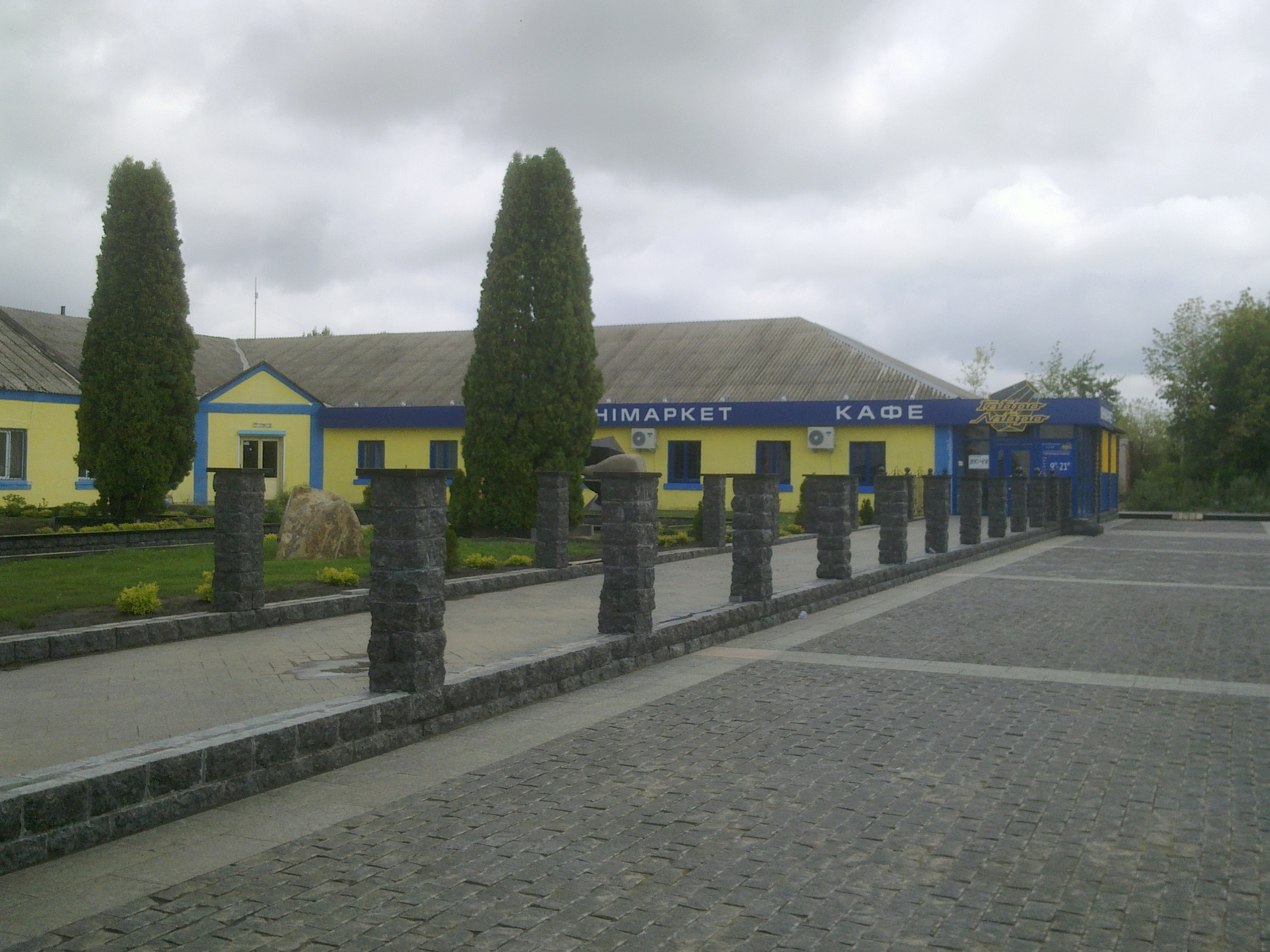

- Location within Zhytomyr Oblast Location within Ukraine
- Coordinates: 50.4725°N 28.8281°E
- Country: Ukraine
- Oblast: Zhytomyr Oblast
- Raion: Zhytomyr Raion
- Time zone: UTC+2 (EET)
  - Summer (DST): UTC+3 (EEST)

Holovyne (Ukrainian: Головине) is a rural settlement in Cherniakhiv Raion, Zhytomyr Oblast, Ukraine. Population: 1,752 (2022 estimate) In 2001, population was 1,969.

== History ==
In 1502, King Alexander Jagiellon granted the village to Semyon Olshanski. Later on, it passed to the Ostrogski and Czartoryski families.

Until 26 January 2024, Holovyne was designated urban-type settlement. On this day, a new law entered into force which abolished this status, and Holovyne became a rural settlement.
