= Novohuivynske =

Rural locality in Zhytomyr Oblast, Ukraine

Novohuivynske Новогуйвинське
- Rural settlement
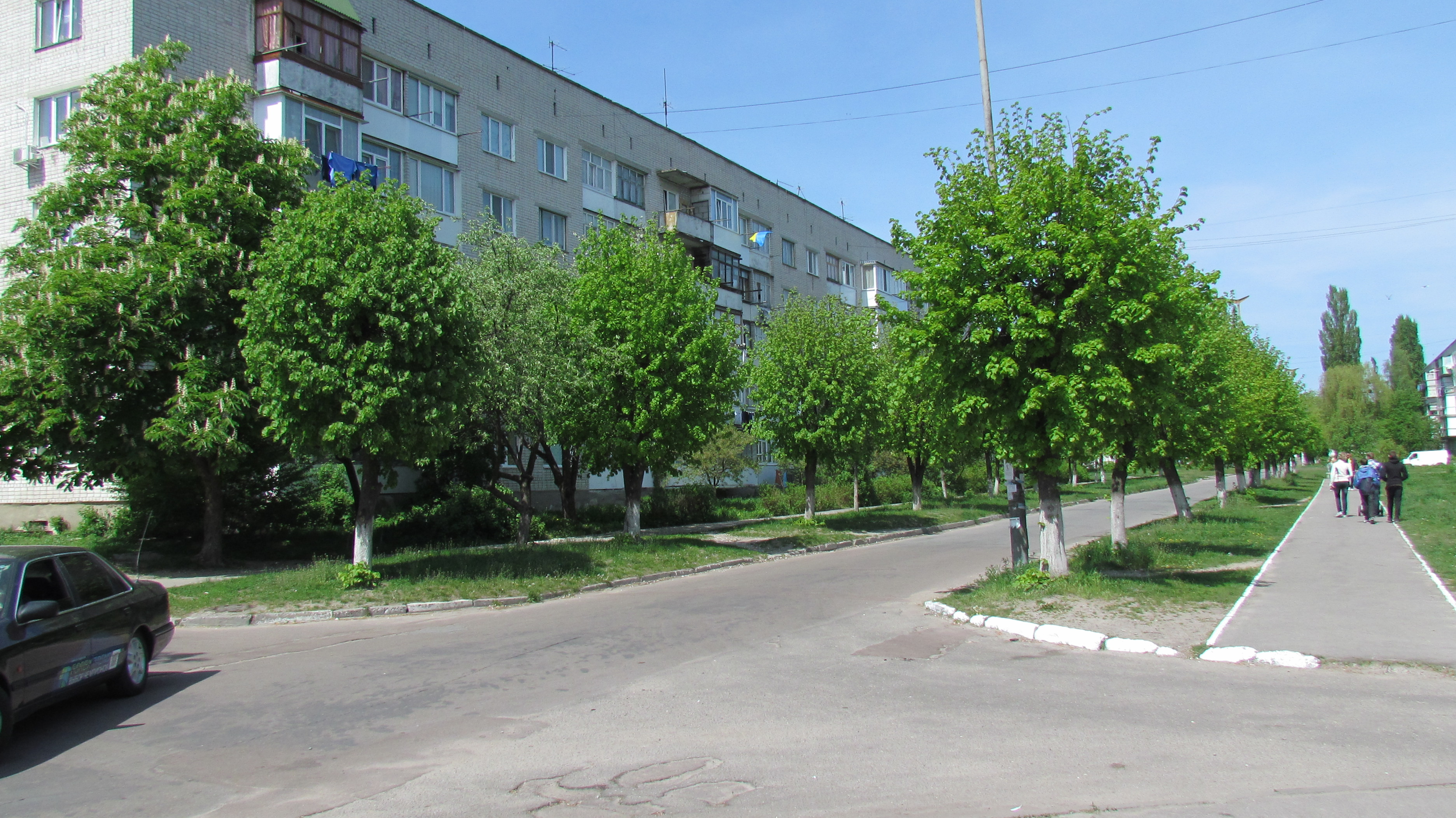

- Location within Zhytomyr Oblast Location within Ukraine
- Coordinates: 50.2022°N 28.685°E
- Country: Ukraine
- Oblast: Zhytomyr Oblast
- Raion: Zhytomyr Raion
- Time zone: UTC+2 (EET)
  - Summer (DST): UTC+3 (EEST)

Novohuivynske (Ukrainian: Новогуйвинське) is a rural settlement in Zhytomyr Raion, Zhytomyr Oblast, Ukraine. Population: 5,240 (2022 estimate) In 2001, population was 5,267.

== History ==
Until 26 January 2024, Novohuivynske was designated urban-type settlement. On this day, a new law entered into force which abolished this status, and Novohuivynske became a rural settlement.
