= Bykivka =

Rural locality in Zhytomyr Oblast, Ukraine

- Rural settlement
- Location within Zhytomyr Oblast Location within Ukraine
- Coordinates: 50.2928°N 27.9831°E
- Country: Ukraine
- Oblast: Zhytomyr Oblast
- Raion: Zhytomyr Raion
- Time zone: UTC+2 (EET)
  - Summer (DST): UTC+3 (EEST)

Bykivka (Ukrainian: Биківка) is a rural settlement in Zhytomyr Raion, Zhytomyr Oblast, Ukraine. Population: 1,650 (2022 estimate).

== History ==
Until 26 January 2024, Bykivka was designated urban-type settlement. On this day, a new law entered into force which abolished this status, and Bykivka became a rural settlement.
