= Bila Krynytsia, Zhytomyr Oblast =

Rural locality in Zhytomyr Oblast, Ukraine

Bila Krynytsia Біла Криниця
- Rural settlement
- Location within Zhytomyr Oblast Location within Ukraine
- Coordinates: 50.6364°N 29.4636°E
- Country: Ukraine
- Oblast: Zhytomyr Oblast
- Raion: Zhytomyr Raion
- Time zone: UTC+2 (EET)
  - Summer (DST): UTC+3 (EEST)

Bila Krynytsia (Ukrainian: Біла Криниця) is a rural settlement in Zhytomyr Raion, Zhytomyr Oblast, Ukraine. Population: 777 (2022 estimate). In 2001, population was 1,077.

== History ==
Until 26 January 2024, Bila Krynytsia was designated urban-type settlement. On this day, a new law entered into force which abolished this status, and Bila Krynytsia became a rural settlement.
