= Poshtove, Zhytomyr Oblast =

Village in Zhytomyr Oblast, Ukraine

Poshtove Поштове
- Village
- Location within Zhytomyr Oblast Location within Ukraine
- Coordinates: 49°47′38″N 28°06′17″E
- Country: Ukraine
- Oblast: Zhytomyr Oblast
- Raion: Berdychiv Raion
- Elevation: 280 m (920 ft)

Population (2001)
  - Total: 29
- Time zone: UTC+2 (EET)
  - Summer (DST): UTC+3 (EEST)

Poshtove (Ukrainian: Поштове) is a village in Berdychiv Raion of Zhytomyr Oblast in Ukraine.

Poshtove was previously located in Chudniv Raion until it was abolished on 18 July 2020 as part of the administrative reform of Ukraine, which reduced the number of raions of Zhytomyr Oblast to four.
