= Horodok, Zhytomyr Oblast =

Rural locality in Zhytomyr Oblast, Ukraine

Horodok Городок
- Rural settlement
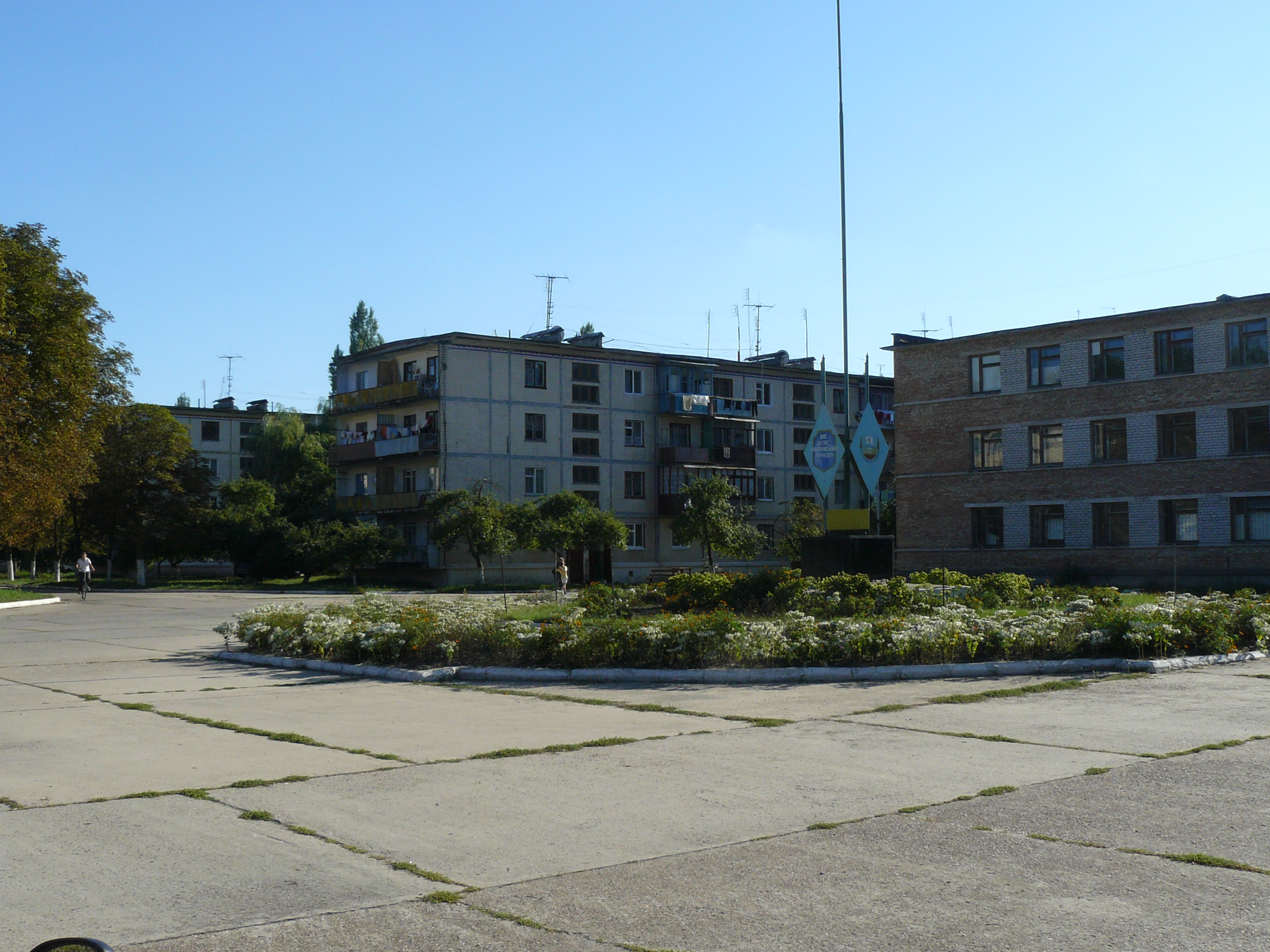

- Location within Zhytomyr Oblast Location within Ukraine
- Coordinates: 50.5925°N 29.4533°E
- Country: Ukraine
- Oblast: Zhytomyr Oblast
- Raion: Zhytomyr Raion
- Time zone: UTC+2 (EET)
  - Summer (DST): UTC+3 (EEST)

Horodok (Ukrainian: Городок) is a rural settlement in Zhytomyr Raion, Zhytomyr Oblast, Ukraine. Population: 2,781 (2022 estimate)

== History ==
Horodok was granted urban-type settlement status on 16 August 2012. On 26 January 2024, a new law entered into force which abolished this status, and Horodok became a rural settlement.
