= Nova Borova =

Rural settlement in Zhytomyr Oblast, Ukraine

- Rural settlement
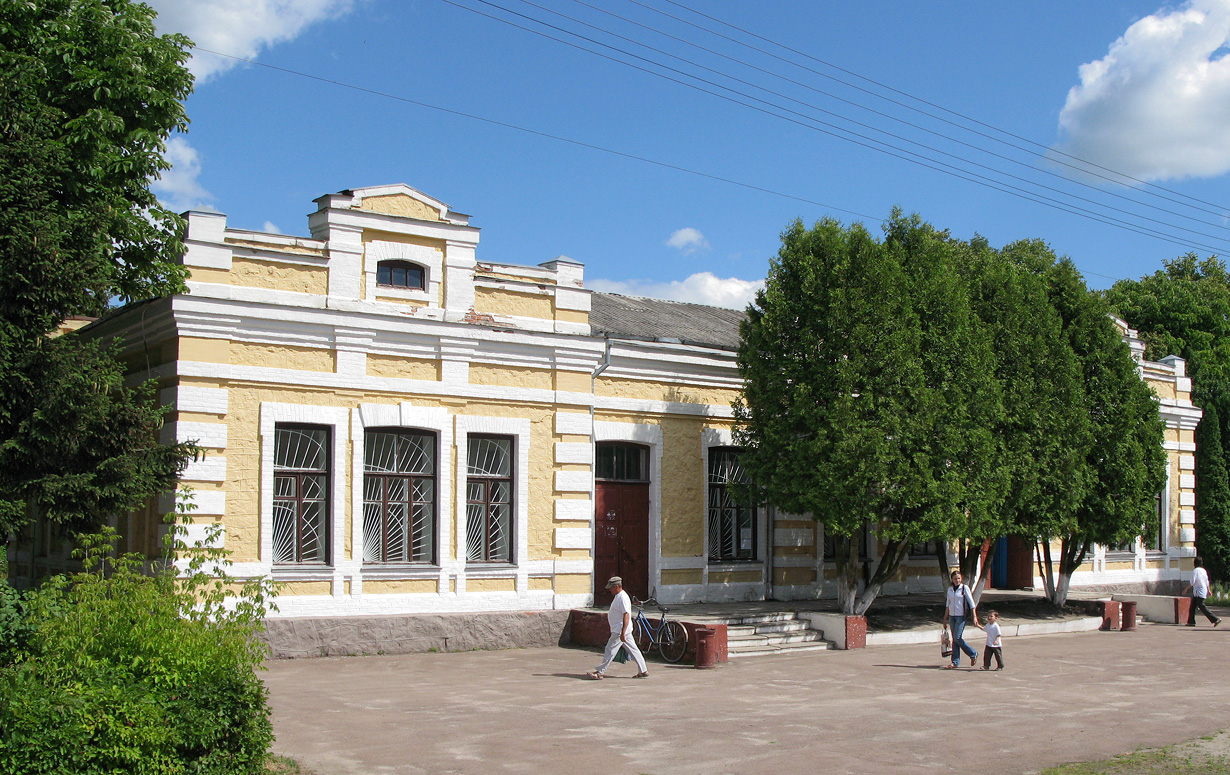
- Nova Borova railway station

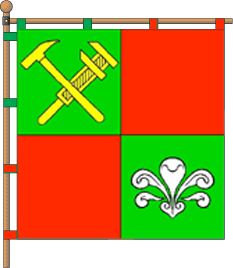
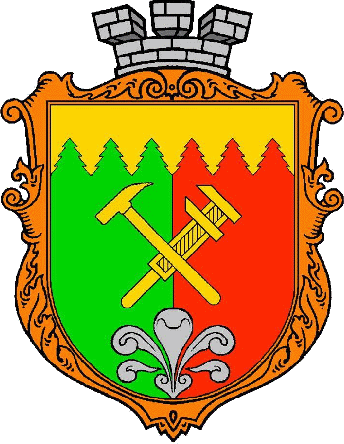
- Flag Coat of arms

- Location within Zhytomyr Oblast Location within Ukraine
- Country: Ukraine
- Oblast: Zhytomyr Oblast
- District: Zhytomyr Raion
- First mention: 1846

Area
  - Total: 5.88 km^{2} (2.27 sq mi)

Population (2022)
  - Total: 5,286
  - Density: 899/km^{2} (2,330/sq mi)
- Time zone: UTC+2 (EET)
  - Summer (DST): UTC+3 (EEST)
- Postal code: 12114

Nova Borova (Ukrainian: Нова Борова) is a rural settlement in Zhytomyr Raion, Zhytomyr Oblast, Ukraine. Population: 5,286 (2022 estimate) In 2001, population was 5,746.

== History ==
Until 26 January 2024, Nova Borova was designated urban-type settlement. On this day, a new law entered into force which abolished this status, and Nova Borova became a rural settlement.
