= Velyki Korovyntsi =

Rural locality in Zhytomyr Oblast, Ukraine

Velyki Korovyntsi Великі Коровинці
- Rural settlement
- Location within Zhytomyr Oblast Location within Ukraine
- Coordinates: 49.9714°N 28.2947°E
- Country: Ukraine
- Oblast: Zhytomyr Oblast
- Raion: Zhytomyr Raion
- Time zone: UTC+2 (EET)
  - Summer (DST): UTC+3 (EEST)

Velyki Korovyntsi (Ukrainian: Великі Коровинці) is a rural settlement in Zhytomyr Raion, Zhytomyr Oblast, Ukraine. Population: 2,102 (2022 estimate) In 2001, population was 2,794.

== History ==
Until 26 January 2024, Velyki Korovyntsi was designated urban-type settlement. On this day, a new law entered into force which abolished this status, and Velyki Korovyntsi became a rural settlement.
