= Vakulenchuk =

Rural locality in Zhytomyr Oblast, Ukraine

Vakulenchuk Вакуленчук
- Rural settlement
- Location within Zhytomyr Oblast Location within Ukraine
- Coordinates: 49.9417°N 28.3031°E
- Country: Ukraine
- Oblast: Zhytomyr Oblast
- Raion: Zhytomyr Raion
- Time zone: UTC+2 (EET)
  - Summer (DST): UTC+3 (EEST)

Vakulenchuk (Ukrainian: Вакуленчук) is a rural settlement in Zhytomyr Raion, Zhytomyr Oblast, Ukraine. Population: 1,800 (2022 estimate) In 2001, population was 2,192.

== History ==
Until 26 January 2024, Vakulenchuk was designated urban-type settlement. On this day, a new law entered into force which abolished this status, and Vakulenchuk became a rural settlement.
