= Yablunets =

Rural settlement in Zhytomyr Oblast, Ukraine

Yablunets Яблунець
- Rural settlement
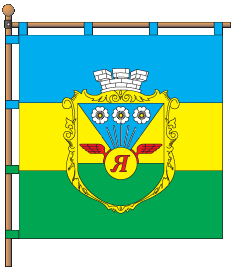
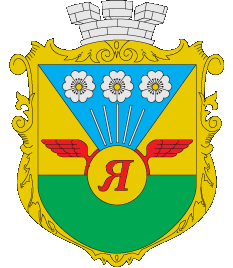
- Flag Coat of arms

- Location in Zhytomyr Oblast Location in Ukraine
- Coordinates: 50°48′26″N 28°3′43″E
- Country: Ukraine
- Oblast: Zhytomyr
- Raion: Zviahel Raion
- Founded: 1910
- Urban-type settlement status: 1977

Government
  - Mayor: Oleksandr Zinchenko

Area
  - Total: 1.43 km^{2} (0.55 sq mi)
- Elevation: 209 m (686 ft)

Population (2022)
  - Total: 1,078
  - Density: 754/km^{2} (1,950/sq mi)
- Postal code: 11250
- Area code: +380 4149

Yablunets (Ukrainian: Яблунець) is a rural settlement in Zviahel Raion, Zhytomyr Oblast, Ukraine. Population: 1,078 (2022 estimate)

== History ==
It was a village in Zhitomirsky Uyezd of the Volhynia Governorate of the Russian Empire.

In January 1989 the population was 1497 people.

Until 26 January 2024, Yablunets was designated urban-type settlement. On this day, a new law entered into force which abolished this status, and Yablunets became a rural settlement.
