= Chudniv =

City in Zhytomyr Oblast, Ukraine

Chudniv Чуднів
- City
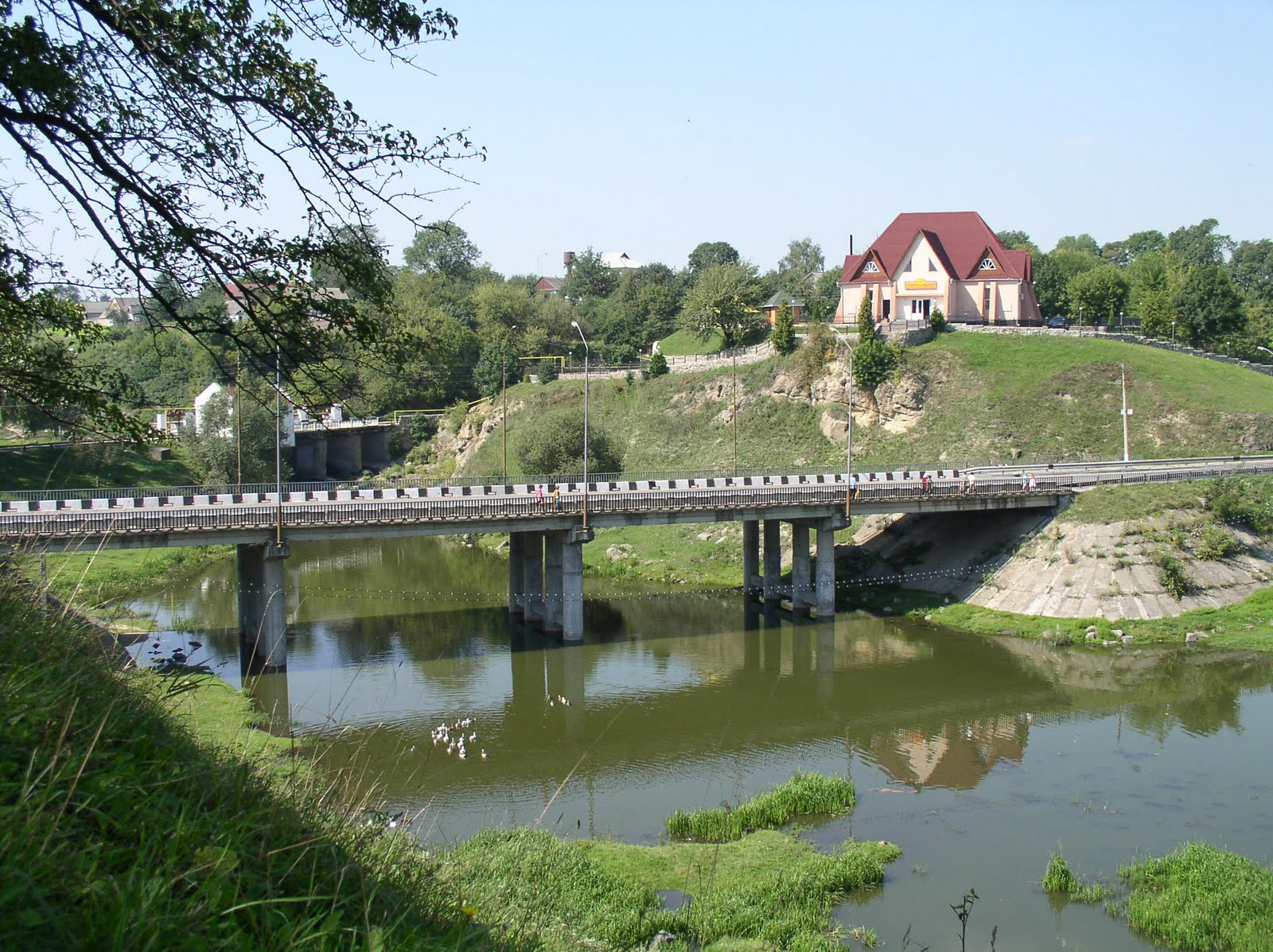
- Teteriv River in Chudniv

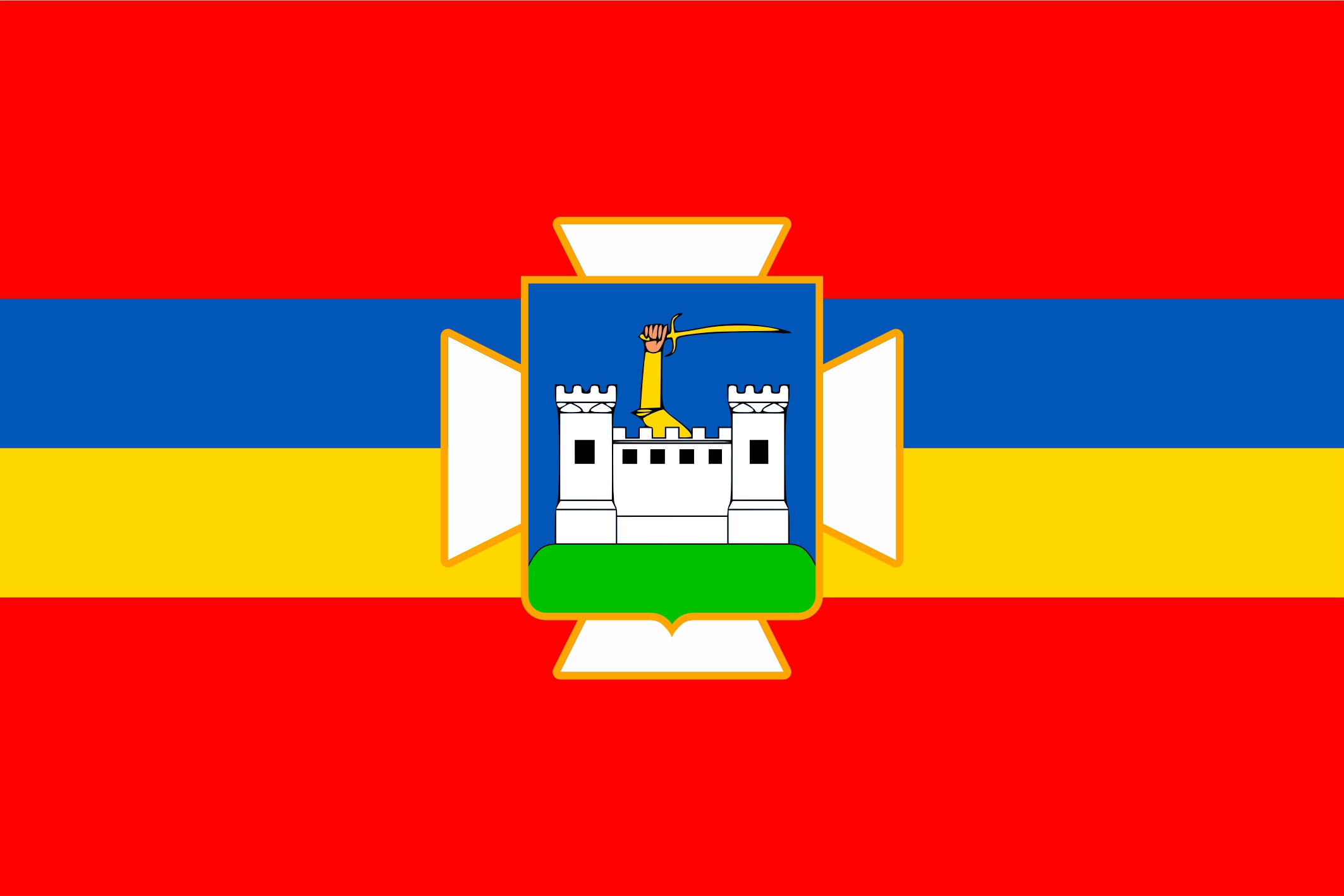
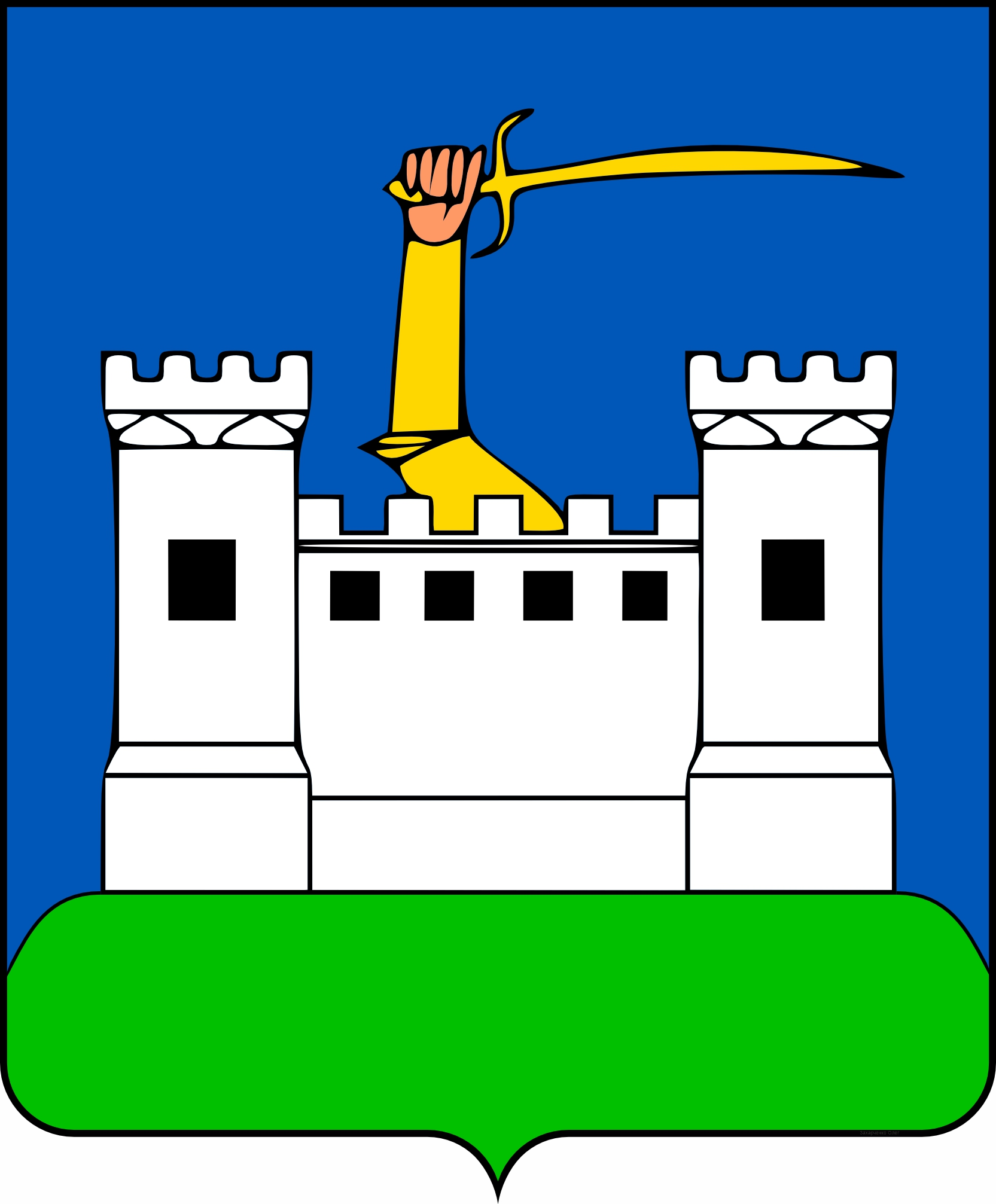
- Flag Coat of arms

- Location in Ukraine Chudniv (Zhytomyr Oblast)
- Country: Ukraine
- Oblast: Zhytomyr Oblast
- Raion: Zhytomyr Raion
- Hromada: Chudniv urban hromada

Population (2022)
  - Total: 5,357
- Time zone: UTC+2 (EET)
  - Summer (DST): UTC+3 (EEST)

Chudniv (Ukrainian: Чуднів, IPA: [ˈtʃud⁽ʲ⁾n⁽ʲ⁾iu̯]; Polish: Cudnów; Yiddish: טשודנאוו; Russian: Чуднов) is a city in Zhytomyr Raion, Zhytomyr Oblast, Ukraine. Prior to 2020, it was the administrative center of the former Chudniv Raion. Located in the northwestern part of the Dnieper Upland, above the Teteriv River (Dnieper basin). Population: 5,357 (2022 estimate).

== History ==
Historical affiliations

Grand Duchy of Lithuania 1471–1569
Polish–Lithuanian Commonwealth 1569–1793
Russian Empire 1793–1917
Ukrainian People's Republic 1917-1918
Ukrainian State 1918
Directory of Ukraine 1918-1919
Soviet Ukraine 1920-1922
Soviet Union 1922–1991
Nazi Germany 1941–1944 (occupation)
Ukraine 1991–present

A significant battle of the Russo-Polish War (1654–1667) was fought near the town in 1660, followed by a treaty between the Polish–Lithuanian Commonwealth and the Cossacks, named after the city. In 1866 Polish Romantic-era novelist Henryk Rzewuski died in Chudniv. The Jewish population was important in the town. During World War II, the Germans occupied the town and kept the Jews imprisoned in a ghetto. In 1941, they were murdered in mass executions perpetrated by an Einsatzgruppen of German policemen.

== Symvolika hromady ==
The coat of arms of Chudniv was approved on January 22, 1796. A silver fortress on an azure background, from which a hand in gold armor, armed with a sword, emerges.

Chudniv Flag The modern appearance of the Chudniv flag was approved on October 14, 2009 by the decision of the Chudniv Village Council. The flag of the city of Chudniv is a red rectangular banner with an aspect ratio of 2:3 with a two-color yellow-blue stripe located in the center of the banner. On top of everything in the central part of the banner there is a silver (white) equal-sized cross with diverging ends, measuring 1/2 of the length of the banner. In the center of the cross, on top of everything there is the coat of arms of the city of Chudniv. The top of the flag is a yellow metal peak. The flagpole is dark brown. A white cross of equal size with diverging ends on a red field is the ancient historical coat of arms of Volyn.

== Notable people ==
- Alter Chudnover, AKA Yehiel Goyzman (1846–1912), virtuoso klezmer violinist;
- Menachem Ribalow – newspaper editor;
- Shloimke (Sam) Beckerman – early 20th century klezmer bandleader in New York City.

== Gallery ==
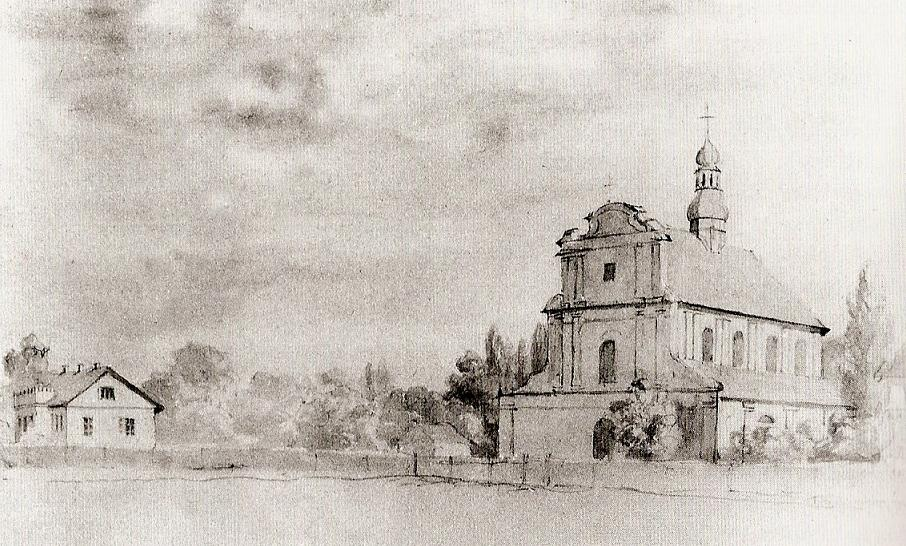
Chudniv by Napoleon Orda

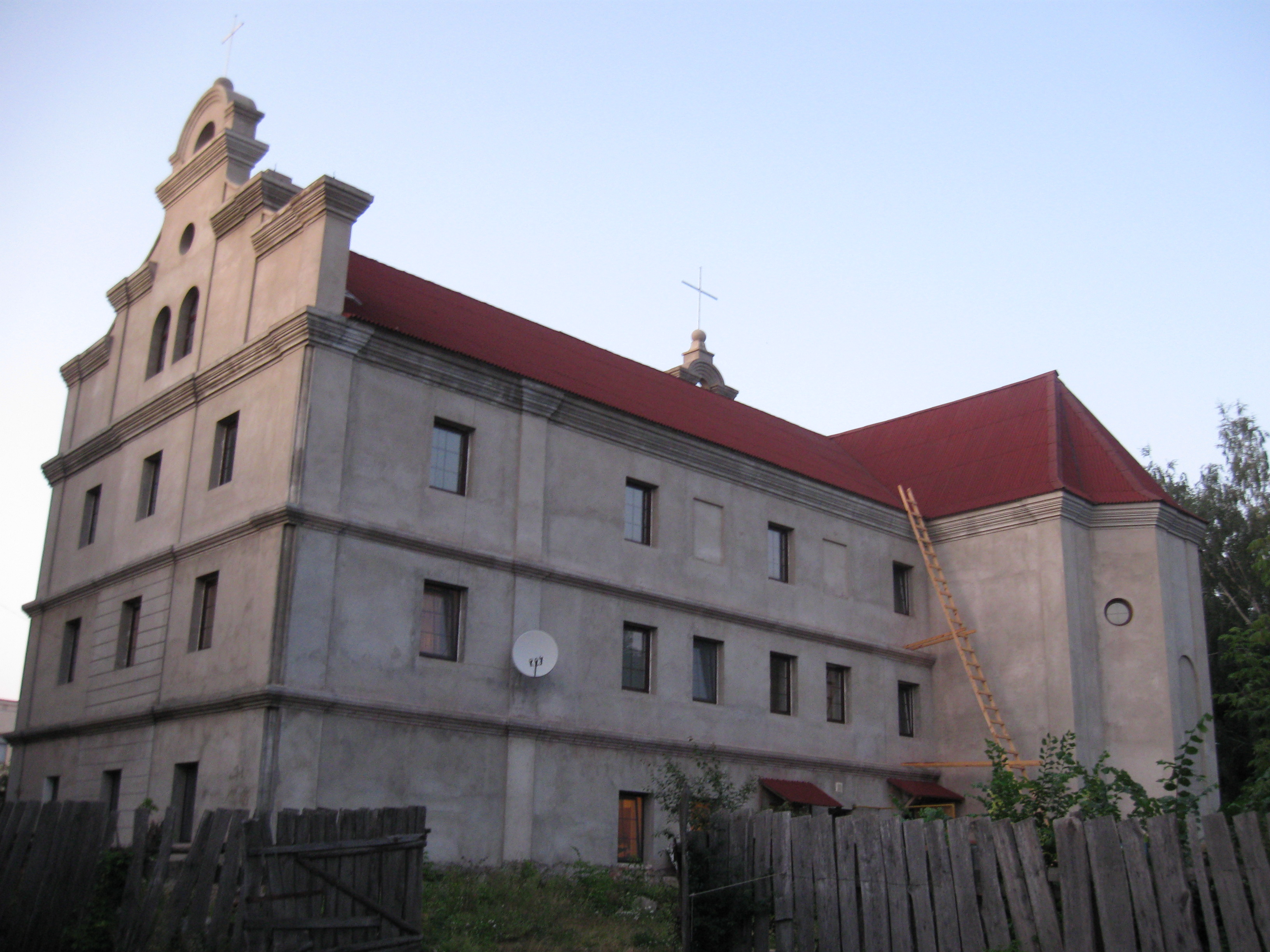
The Catholic church today

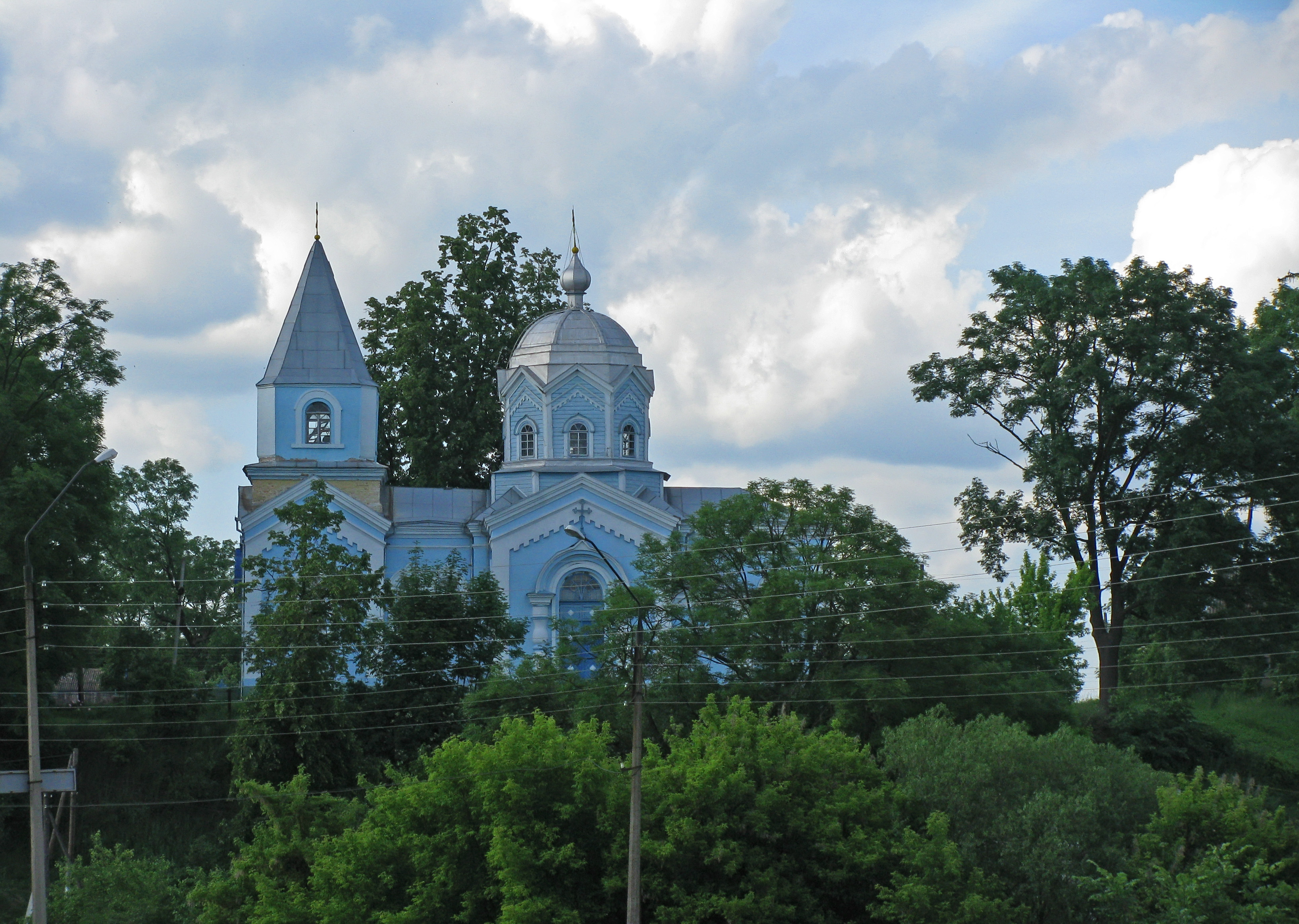
Nativity Church in Chudniv
