= Hranitne, Zhytomyr Oblast =

Rural locality in Zhytomyr Oblast, Ukraine

Coordinates: 50°44′43″N 29°20′55″E

Hranite Гранітне
- Rural settlement
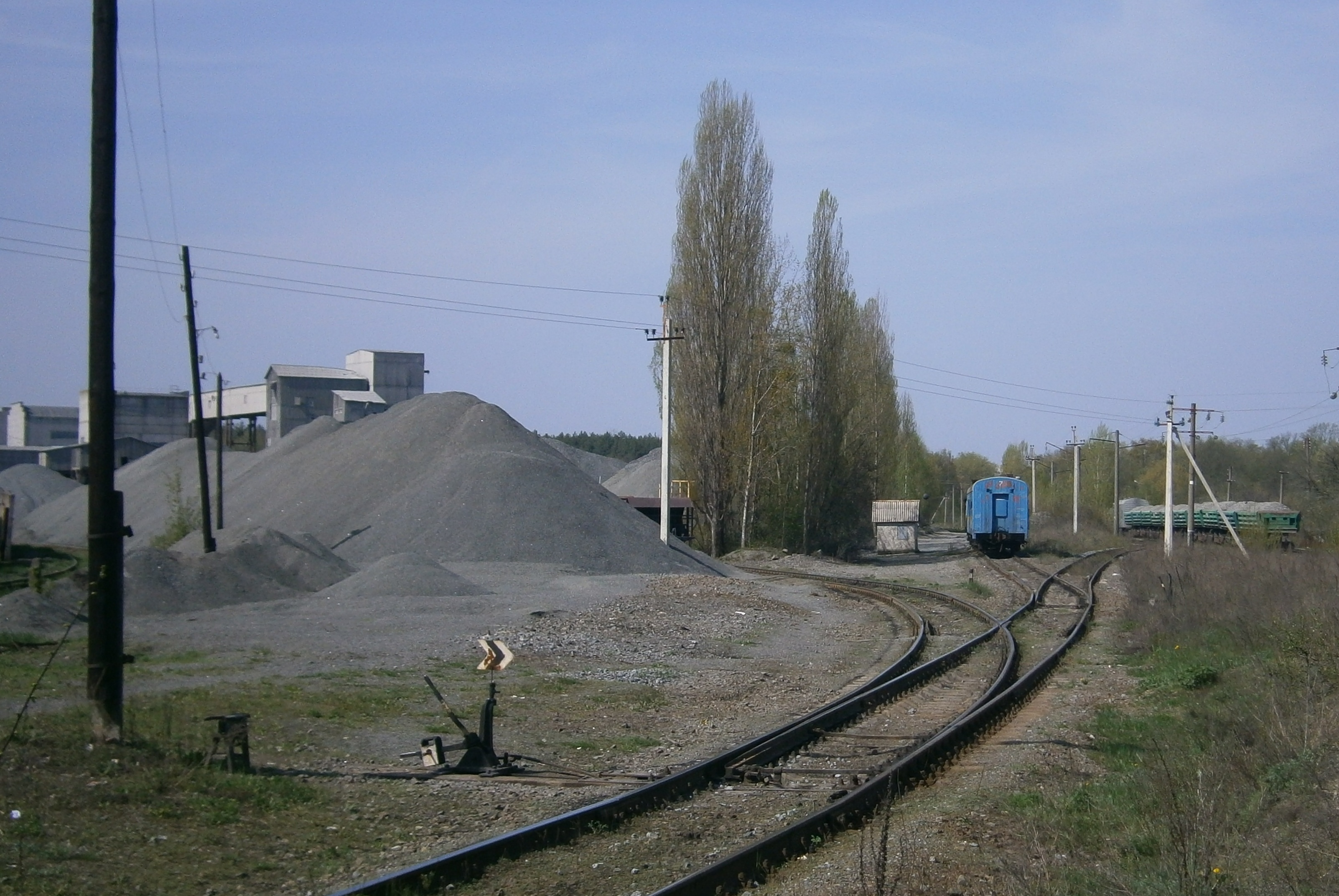
- Granite crushing plant in Hranitne

- Location within Zhytomyr Oblast Location within Ukraine
- Country: Ukraine
- Oblast: Zhytomyr Oblast
- Raion: Korosten Raion
- Time zone: UTC+2 (EET)
  - Summer (DST): UTC+3 (EEST)

Hranitne (Ukrainian: Гранітне) is a rural settlement in Korosten Raion, Zhytomyr Oblast, Ukraine. It is located in an area containing reserves of granite, which provides Hranitne with an economy based on extraction and crushing of the stone for building use. Population: 1,344 (2022 estimate) In 2001, population was 1,631.

== History ==
Until 26 January 2024, Hranitne was designated urban-type settlement. On this day, a new law entered into force which abolished this status, and Hranitne became a rural settlement.
