= Novi Bilokorovychi =

Rural locality in Zhytomyr Oblast, Ukraine

Bilokorovychi Білокоровичі
- Rural settlement
- Location within Zhytomyr Oblast Location within Ukraine
- Coordinates: 51.0475°N 28.0519°E
- Country: Ukraine
- Oblast: Zhytomyr Oblast
- Raion: Korosten Raion
- Time zone: UTC+2 (EET)
  - Summer (DST): UTC+3 (EEST)

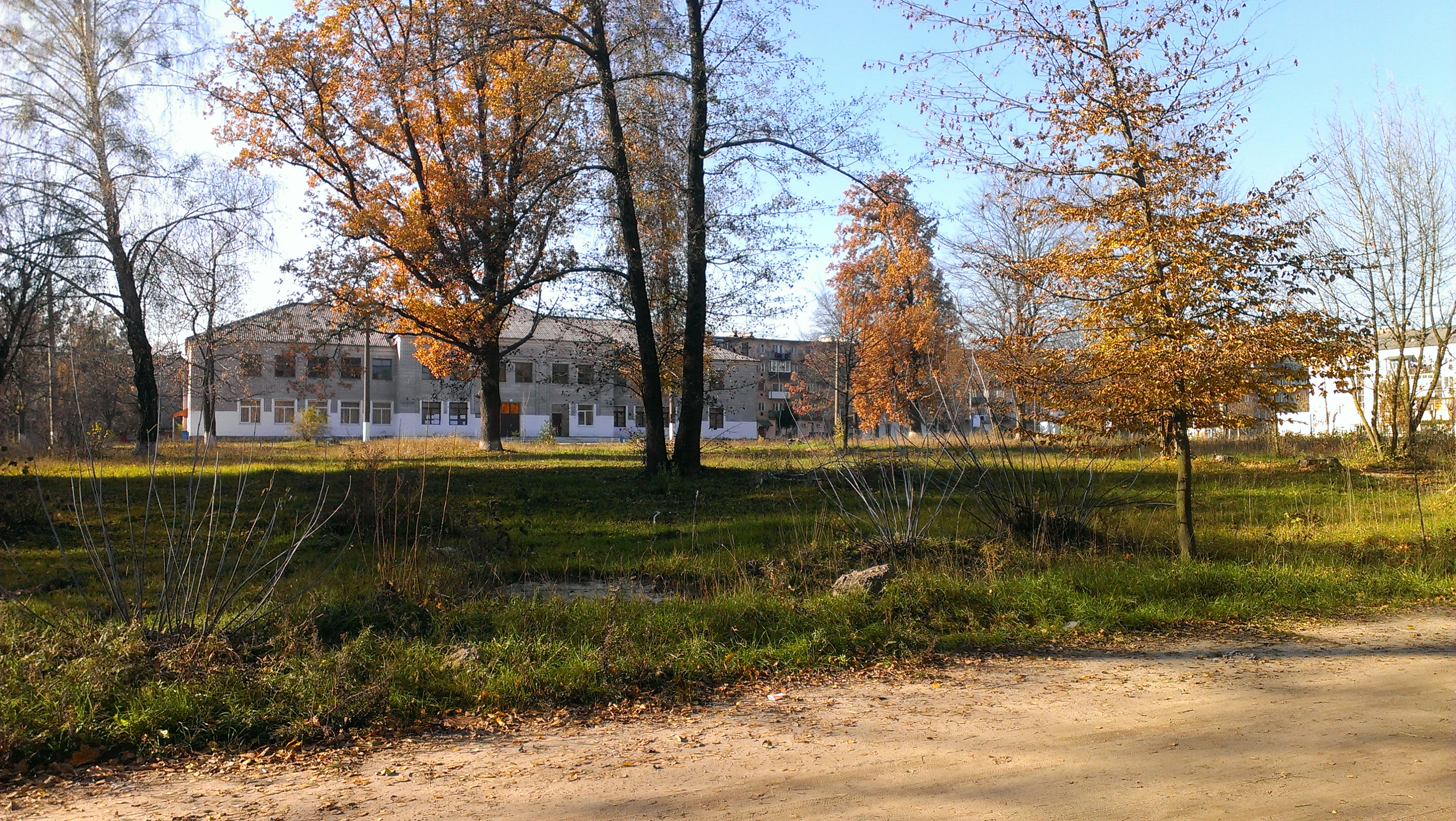
Military city in Novi Bilokorovychi

Novi Bilokorovychi (Ukrainian: Нові Білокоровичі) is a rural settlement in Korosten Raion, Zhytomyr Oblast, Ukraine. Population: 2,976 (2022 estimate) In 2001, population was 3,370.

== History ==
Until 26 January 2024, Novi Bilokorovychi was designated urban-type settlement. On this day, a new law entered into force which abolished this status, and Novi Bilokorovychi became a rural settlement.
