= Marianivka, Zviahel Raion, Zhytomyr Oblast =

Rural locality in Zhytomyr Oblast, Ukraine

Marianivka Мар'янівка
- Rural settlement
- Location within Zhytomyr Oblast Location within Ukraine
- Coordinates: 50°18′28″N 27°52′26″E
- Country: Ukraine
- Oblast: Zhytomyr Oblast
- Raion: Zviahel Raion
- Time zone: UTC+2 (EET)
  - Summer (DST): UTC+3 (EEST)

Marianivka (Ukrainian: Мар'янівка) is a rural settlement in Zviahel Raion, Zhytomyr Oblast, Ukraine. Population: 1,444 (2022 estimate). In 2001, population was 1,499.

== History ==
Until 26 January 2024, Marianivka was designated urban-type settlement. On this day, a new law entered into force which abolished this status, and Marianivka became a rural settlement.
