= Druzhba, Zhytomyr Oblast =

Rural locality in Zhytomyr Oblast, Ukraine

Druzhba Дружба
- Rural settlement
- Location within Zhytomyr Oblast Location within Ukraine
- Coordinates: 51.1861°N 27.9661°E
- Country: Ukraine
- Oblast: Zhytomyr Oblast
- Raion: Korosten Raion
- Time zone: UTC+2 (EET)
  - Summer (DST): UTC+3 (EEST)

Druzhba (Ukrainian: Дружба) is a rural settlement in Korosten Raion, Zhytomyr Oblast, Ukraine. Population: 495 (2022 estimate) In 2001, population was 562.

== History ==
Until 26 January 2024, Druzhba was designated urban-type settlement. On this day, a new law entered into force which abolished this status, and Druzhba became a rural settlement.
