= Buchmany =

Rural locality in Zhytomyr Oblast, Ukraine

Buchmany Бучмани
- Rural settlement
- Location within Zhytomyr Oblast Location within Ukraine
- Coordinates: 51°4′6″N 28°2′47″E
- Country: Ukraine
- Oblast: Zhytomyr Oblast
- Raion: Korosten Raion

Population (2022)
  - Total: 631

Buchmany (Ukrainian: Бучмани) is a rural settlement in Korosten Raion, Zhytomyr Oblast, Ukraine. Population: 631 (2022 estimate). In 2001, population was 832.

== History ==
Until 26 January 2024, Buchmany was designated urban-type settlement. On this day, a new law entered into force which abolished this status, and Buchmany became a rural settlement.
