= Chopovychi =

Rural locality in Zhytomyr Oblast, Ukraine

Chopovychi Чоповичі
- Rural settlement
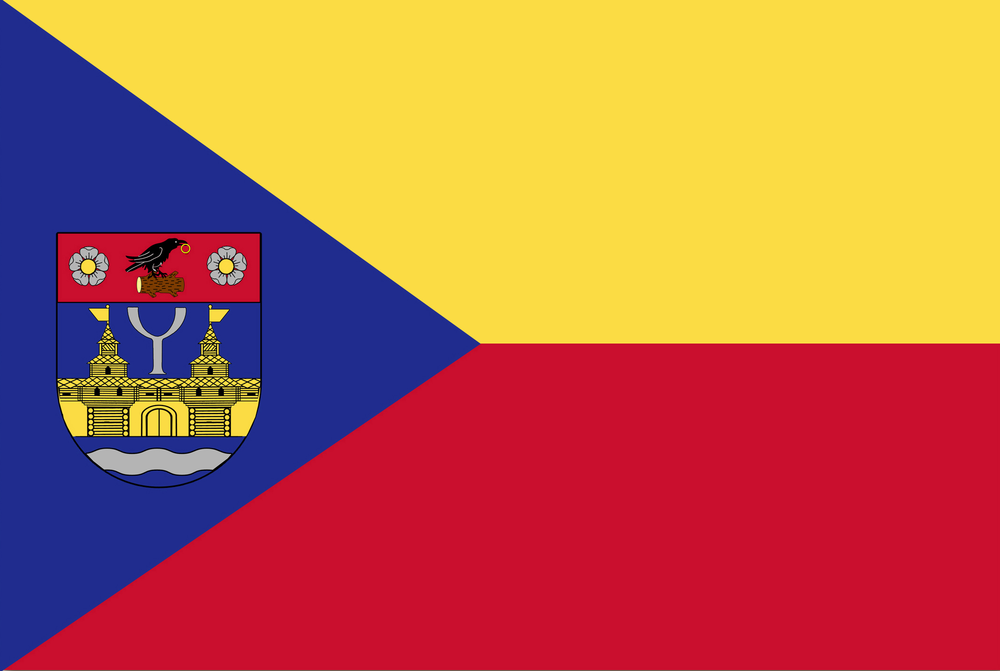
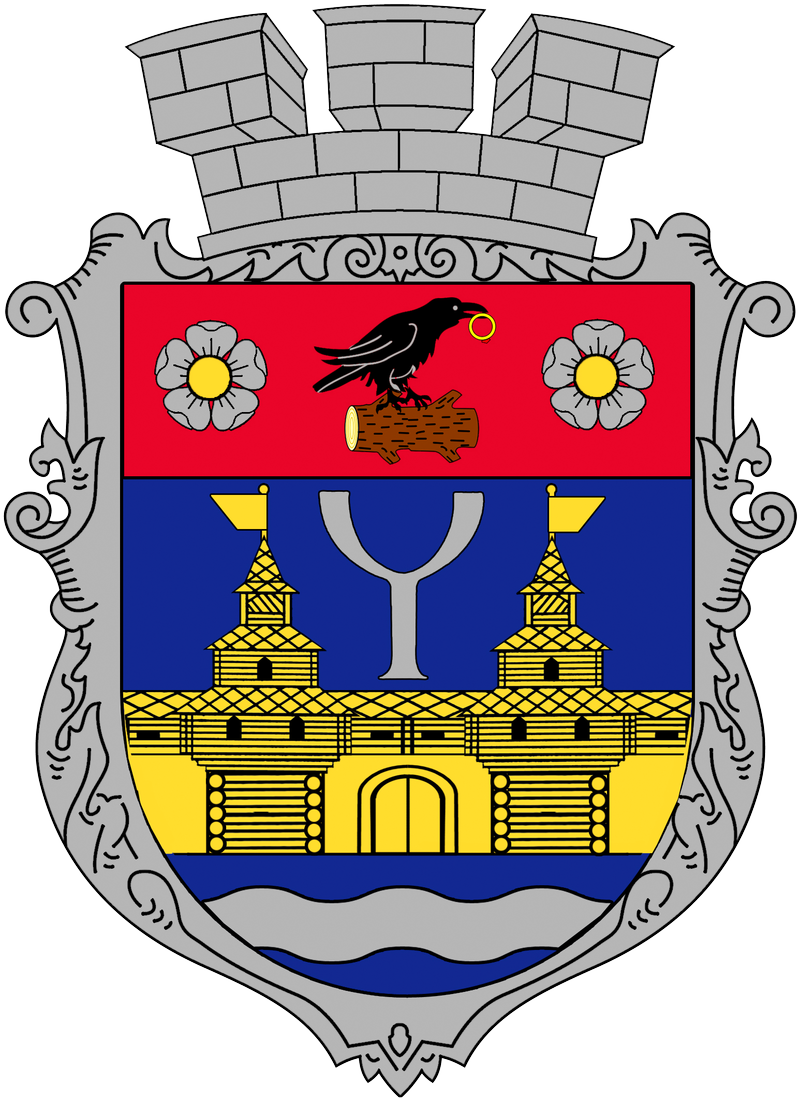
- Flag Coat of arms

- Location in the Zhytomyr Oblast Location in Ukraine
- Coordinates: 50°50′N 28°57′E
- Country: Ukraine
- Oblast: Zhytomyr Oblast
- Raion: Korosten Raion

Area
  - Total: 7 km^{2} (2.7 sq mi)

Population (2001)
  - Total: 1,888
  - Density: 2,697/km^{2} (6,990/sq mi)
- Time zone: UTC+2 (EET)
  - Summer (DST): UTC+3 (EEST)

Chopovychi (Ukrainian: Чоповичі) is a rural settlement in Korosten Raion, Zhytomyr Oblast, Ukraine. Population: 1,770 (2022 estimate) In 2001, population was 2,272.

== History ==
Until 26 January 2024, Chopovychi was designated urban-type settlement. On this day, a new law entered into force which abolished this status, and Chopovychi became a rural settlement.
