= Novoozerianka =

Rural locality in Zhytomyr Oblast, Ukraine

Novoozerianka Новоозерянка
- Rural settlement
- Location within Zhytomyr Oblast Location within Ukraine
- Coordinates: 51.2133°N 28.0019°E
- Country: Ukraine
- Oblast: Zhytomyr Oblast
- Raion: Korosten Raion
- Time zone: UTC+2 (EET)
  - Summer (DST): UTC+3 (EEST)

Novoozerianka (Ukrainian: Новоозерянка) is a rural settlement in Korosten Raion, Zhytomyr Oblast, Ukraine. Population: 518 (2022 estimate) IN 2001, population was 690.

== History ==
Until 26 January 2024, Novoozerianka was designated urban-type settlement. On this day, a new law entered into force which abolished this status, and Novoozerianka became a rural settlement.
