= Chudniv Raion =

Former subdivision of Zhytomyr Oblast, Ukraine

Chudniv Raion Чуднівський район
- Raion
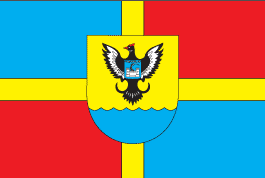
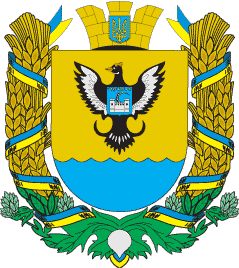
- Flag Coat of arms

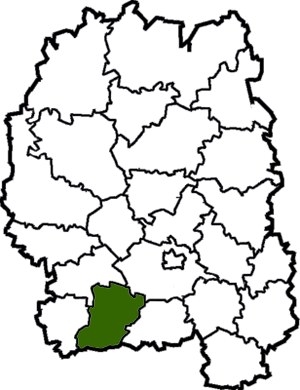
- Coordinates: 50°2′41″N 28°7′35″E
- Country: Ukraine
- Oblast: Zhytomyr Oblast
- Disestablished: 18 July 2020
- Admin. center: Chudniv
- Subdivisions: List: 1 — city councils; 3 — settlement councils; — rural councils; Number of localities: 1 — cities; 3 — urban-type settlements; — villages; — rural settlements

Area
  - Total: 1,037 km^{2} (400 sq mi)

Population (2020)
  - Total: 33,247 ▼
  - Density: 32.06/km^{2} (83.04/sq mi)
- Time zone: UTC+02:00 (EET)
  - Summer (DST): UTC+03:00 (EEST)
- Area code: +380

Chudniv Raion (Ukrainian: Чуднівський район) was a raion (district) of Zhytomyr Oblast, northern Ukraine. Its administrative centre was located at Chudniv. The raion covered an area of 1,037 square kilometres (400 mi^{2}). The raion was abolished on 18 July 2020 as part of the administrative reform of Ukraine, which reduced the number of raions of Zhytomyr Oblast to four. The area of Chudniv Raion was merged into Zhytomyr Raion. The last estimate of the raion population was 33,247 (2020 est.)
