= Luhyny =

Rural settlement in Zhytomyr Oblast, Ukraine

- Rural settlement
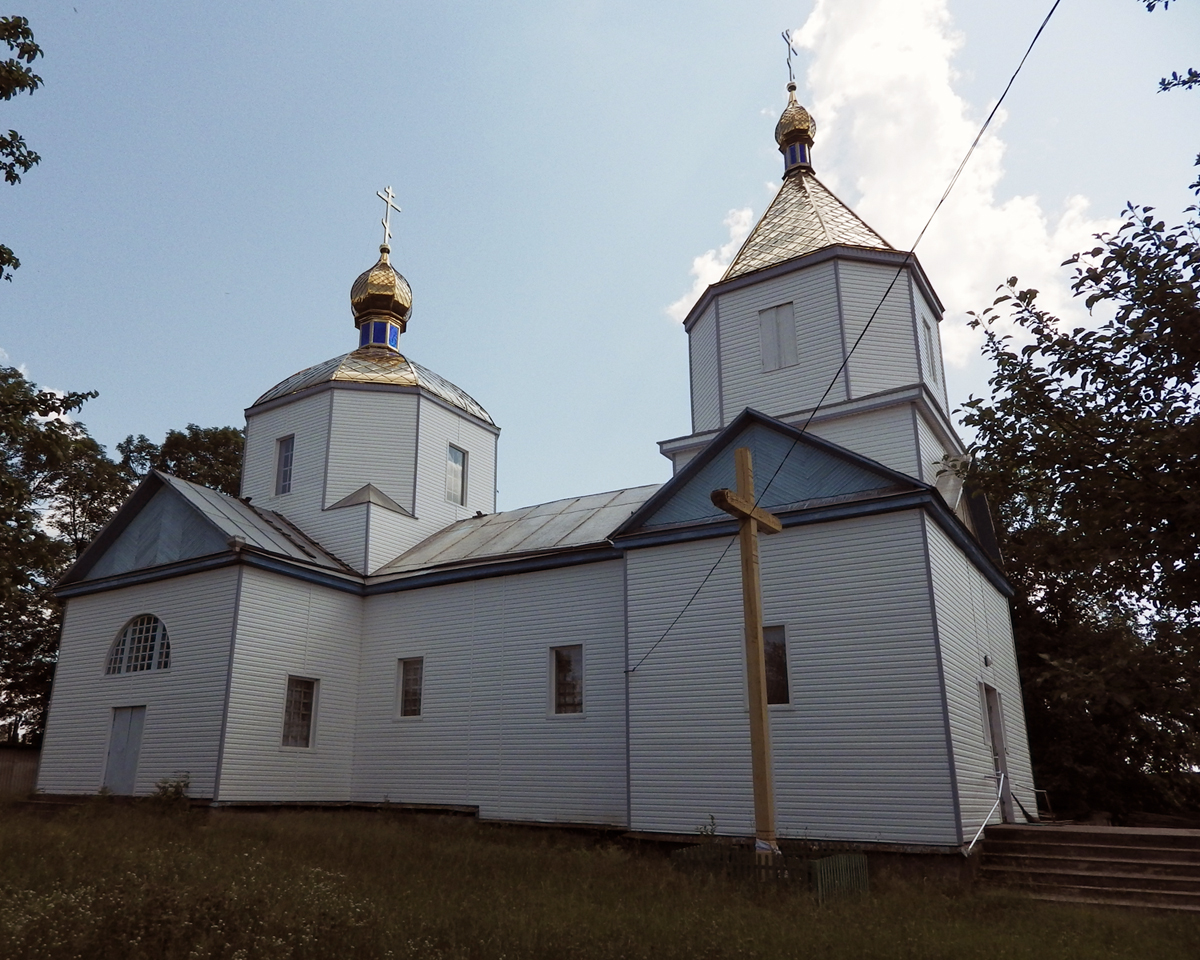
- Church of the Nativity

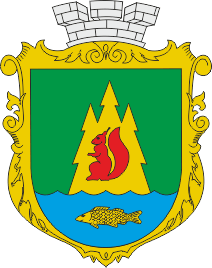
- Coat of arms

- Location within Zhytomyr Oblast Location within Ukraine
- Coordinates: 51°4′42″N 28°23′51″E
- Country: Ukraine
- Oblast: Zhytomyr Oblast
- District: Korosten Raion

Area
  - Total: 5 km^{2} (1.9 sq mi)
- Time zone: UTC+2 (EET)
  - Summer (DST): UTC+3 (EEST)
- Postal code: 11300

Luhyny (Ukrainian: Лугини, Russian: Луги́ны, Polish: Łuhyny) is a rural settlement in Korosten Raion, Zhytomyr Oblast, Ukraine. Prior to 2020, it was the administrative center of the former Luhyny Raion. Population: 3,868 (2022 estimate) In 2001, population was 4,692. Its area is 5 km^{2}.

== History ==
Luhyny was founded in 1606, and its name comes from Ukrainian word "луг" ("meadow"), as there are a lot of green places in that area. Luhyny is crossed by a river Zherev (Жерев); the town is surrounded mostly by forests. There are two schools of general education, one musical school and sports school, one hospital, one library and a club. Luhyny also publishes its own newspaper - "Promin" ("Промінь").

Before the war, the Jewish community was large and made up about 20% of the local population. The town was occupied by Germans in the middle of July 1941. By that time, many Jews had evacuated to the East and young men were enrolled in the Soviet army. The Jews left were murdered during mass executions, it was carried out by German mobile units, accompanied by local policemen.

Until 26 January 2024, Luhyny was designated urban-type settlement. On this day, a new law entered into force which abolished this status, and Luhyny became a rural settlement.

== Notable people ==
- Viktor Bannikov - Soviet and Ukrainian footballer, first president of the Football Federation of Ukraine.
