= Pulyny =

Rural settlement in Zhytomyr Oblast, Ukraine

Pulyny Пулини
- Rural settlement
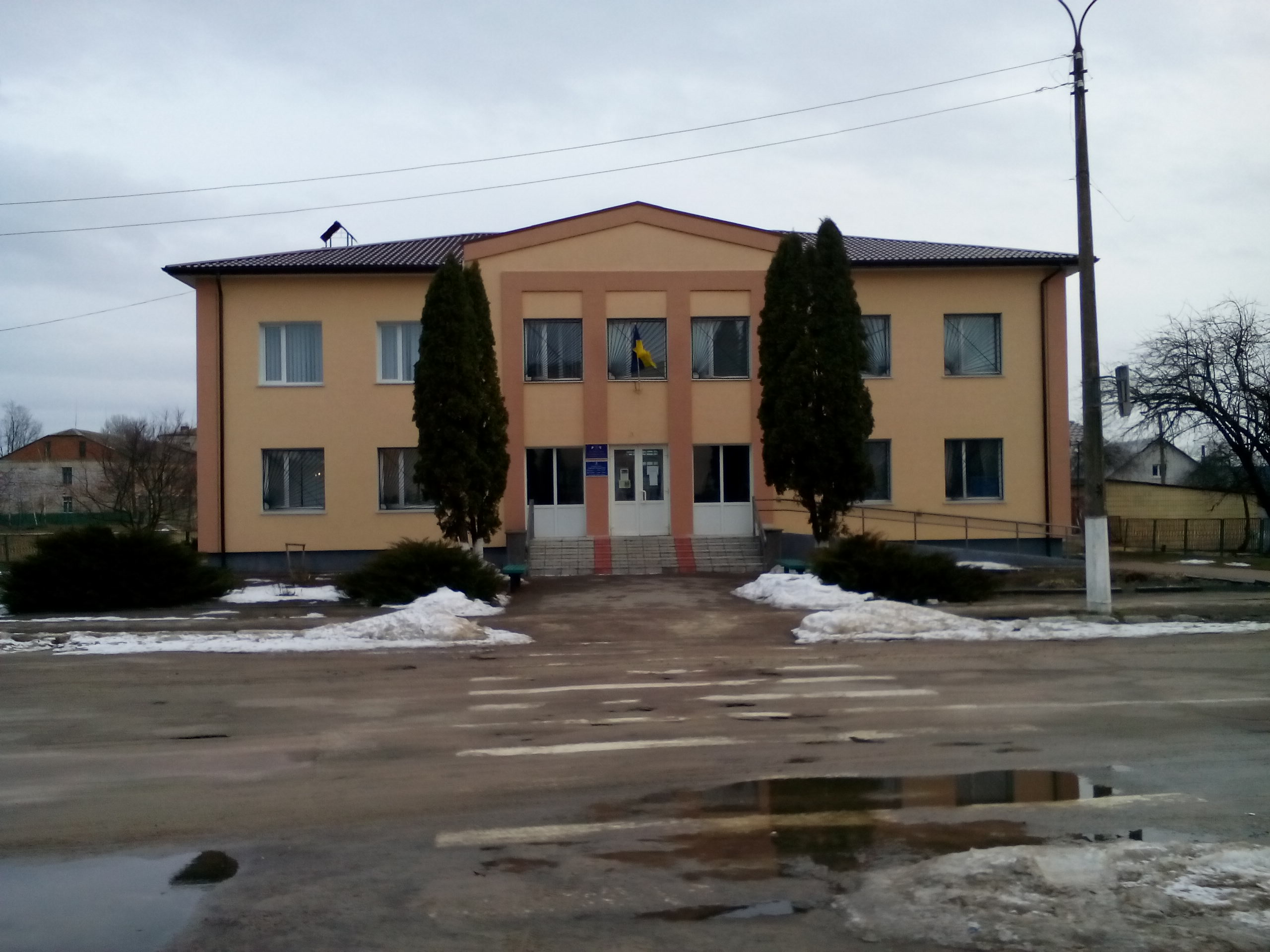
- Local administration building in Pulyny

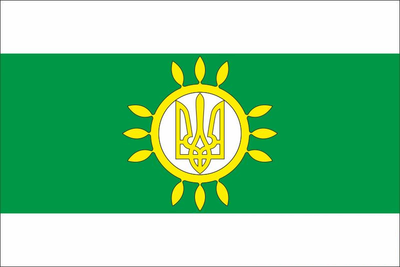
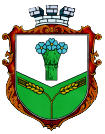
- Flag Coat of arms

- Location in Zhytomyr Oblast Location in Ukraine
- Coordinates: 50°27′58″N 28°15′39″E
- Country: Ukraine
- Oblast: Zhytomyr
- Raion: Zhytomyr Raion
- First mentioned: 12th Century
- Urban-type settlement status: 1935

Government
  - Mayor: Oleksandr Havrylyuk

Area
  - Total: 10 km^{2} (3.9 sq mi)
- Elevation: 232 m (761 ft)

Population (2022)
  - Total: 5,141
  - Density: 510/km^{2} (1,300/sq mi)
- Postal code: 12001
- Area code: +380 04131

Pulyny (Ukrainian: Пулини), from 1935 until 2016 called Chervonoarmiisk (Червоноармійськ, Russian: Червоноарме́йск), is a rural settlement in Zhytomyr Raion, Zhytomyr Oblast, Ukraine. Prior to the 2020 administrative reform, it was the administrative center of Pulyny Raion. Population: 5,141 (2022 estimate)

The town was first mentioned in the middle of the twelfth century under the name Chortolisy (Ukrainian: Чортоліси). In the annals there was a mention of a "Devil's Wood" (Ukrainian: Чортів ліс) nearby, which presumably lies behind the name; it was so called because of impenetrable thickets, swamps, and the debris of dead trees. Chortolisy was located on one of the ancient paths leading from Kyiv to the lands further west. In the fourteenth century the settlement belonged to the Grand Duchy of Lithuania, and from the sixteenth century to Polish feudal lords. In 1578, the settlement was mentioned under a new name, Pulyny.

From 1793, right-bank Ukraine became part of Russia, the village of Pulyny became part of the Zhitomir district. Villagers engaged in agriculture and trade. After the abolition of serfdom in 1861, handicrafts and industry developed in the village; there were a candle factory, a furniture factory, two workshops, and a match factory. By the beginning of the twentieth century there were an iron foundry, a steam mill, two breweries, and a brickyard which also manufactured tiles and ceramic ware. By 1899 there was a population of 2,125 people.

As a result of the October Revolution and the Russian Civil War, the Soviet government was finally established in Pulyny in June 1920. On June 20, 1930, the town became the administrative center of the Pulin German Autonomous Region (Russian: Пулинский немецкий национальный район), which included thirty selsoviets. From February 1931 it belonged to the Kyiv Oblast. By 1934 the Autonomous Region became subject to serious repression; the low rate of collectivization (only 34 percent, as compared to 98 percent for German colonies in Left Bank Ukraine) was attributed to "kulak-wreckers," and Germans were now often seen as agents of Nazi Germany. The Autonomous Region was liquidated in 1935, and on October 3, 1935, the town was renamed Krasnoarmeysk (Russian: Красноармейск).

During World War II, 207 soldiers from the town did not return from the front.

In 2016, Verkhovna Rada adopted decision to rename Chervonoarmiisk back to former name Pulyny.

Pulyny is the birthplace of the writers Svyatoslav Borodulin, G.Y. Diamant, and Ernst Kontschak.

Until 26 January 2024, Pulyny was designated urban-type settlement. On this day, a new law entered into force which abolished this status, and Pulyny became a rural settlement.

== Sources ==
- A. Beznosoye, "ПУЛИНСКИЙ НЕМЕЦКИЙ НАЦИОНАЛЬНЫЙ РАЙОН," Nemtsy Rossii Entsyklopedia.
