= Liubar Raion =

Former subdivision of Zhytomyr Oblast, Ukraine

Liubar Raion Любарський район
- Raion
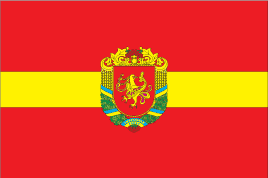
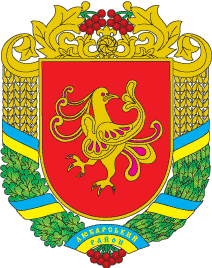
- Flag Coat of arms

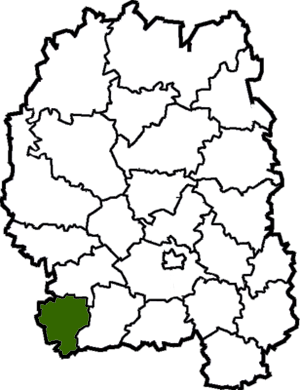
- Coordinates: 49°55′20″N 27°45′19″E
- Country: Ukraine
- Oblast: Zhytomyr Oblast
- Disestablished: 18 July 2020
- Admin. center: Liubar
- Subdivisions: List: 0 — city councils; 1 — settlement councils; — rural councils; Number of localities: 0 — cities; 1 — urban-type settlements; — villages; — rural settlements

Area
  - Total: 757 km^{2} (292 sq mi)

Population (2020)
  - Total: 26,032 ▼
  - Density: 34.4/km^{2} (89.1/sq mi)
- Time zone: UTC+02:00 (EET)
  - Summer (DST): UTC+03:00 (EEST)
- Area code: +380

Liubar Raion (Ukrainian: Любарський район) was a raion (district) of Zhytomyr Oblast, northern Ukraine. Its administrative centre was located at the urban-type settlement of Liubar. The raion covered an area of 757 square kilometres (292 mi^{2}). The raion was abolished on 18 July 2020 as part of the administrative reform of Ukraine, which reduced the number of raions of Zhytomyr Oblast to four. The area of Liubar Raion was merged into Zhytomyr Raion. The last estimate of the raion population was 26,032 (2020 est.)
