= Portselianove =

Rural locality in Zhytomyr Oblast, Ukraine

Coordinates: 50°12′4″N 27°38′2″E

Portselianove Порцелянове
- Rural settlement
- Location within Zhytomyr Oblast Location within Ukraine
- Country: Ukraine
- Oblast: Zhytomyr Oblast
- Raion: Zviahel Raion
- Hromada: Baranivka urban hromada
- Time zone: UTC+2 (EET)
  - Summer (DST): UTC+3 (EEST)

Portselianove (Ukrainian: Порцелянове), formerly known as Pershotravensk (Ukrainian: Першотравенськ) is a rural settlement in Zviahel Raion, Zhytomyr Oblast, Ukraine. Its population is 3,261 (2022 estimate).

== History ==
The settlement arose in the late 19th century, under the name Tokarivka (Ukrainian: Токарівка). In 1910, a large protest took place at the porcelain factory in Tokarivka. Its name was changed to Pershotravensk in 1934.

Until 26 January 2024, Pershotravensk was designated urban-type settlement. On this day, a new law entered into force which abolished this status, and Pershotravensk became a rural settlement.

On April 3, the Committee on the Organization of State Power, Local Self-government, Regional Development, and Urban Planning in the Verkhovna Rada stated their support for renaming the settlement to Portselianove. On 19 September 2024, the Verkhovna Rada voted to rename Pershotravensk to Portselianove.
