= Luhyny Raion =

Former subdivision of Zhytomyr Oblast, Ukraine

Luhyny Raion Лугинський район
- Raion
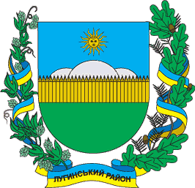
- Flag Coat of arms

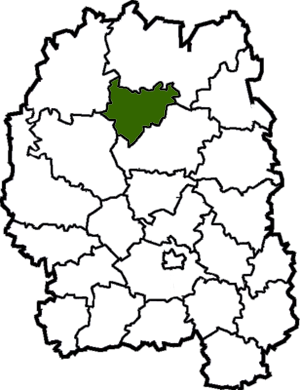
- Coordinates: 51°4′51″N 28°23′35″E
- Country: Ukraine
- Oblast: Zhytomyr Oblast
- Disestablished: 18 July 2020
- Admin. center: Luhyny
- Subdivisions: List: 0 — city councils; 2 — settlement councils; — rural councils; Number of localities: 0 — cities; 2 — urban-type settlements; — villages; — rural settlements

Area
  - Total: 994 km^{2} (384 sq mi)

Population (2020-01-01)
  - Total: 15,691 ▼
  - Density: 15.8/km^{2} (40.9/sq mi)
- Time zone: UTC+02:00 (EET)
  - Summer (DST): UTC+03:00 (EEST)
- Area code: +380

Luhyny Raion (Ukrainian: Лугинський район) was a raion (district) of Zhytomyr Oblast in northern Ukraine. Its administrative centre was located at Luhyny. The raion covered an area of 994 square kilometres (384 mi^{2}). The raion was abolished on 18 July 2020 as part of the administrative reform of Ukraine, which reduced the number of raions of Zhytomyr Oblast to four. The area of Luhyny Raion was merged into Korosten Raion. The last estimate of the raion population was 15,691 (2020 est.).

== See also ==
- Chernobyl disaster
- Chernobyl Exclusion Zone
