= Polianka, Zhytomyr Oblast =

Rural locality in Zhytomyr Oblast, Ukraine

Coordinates: 50°15′30″N 27°41′22″E

Polianka Полянка
- Rural settlement
- Location within Zhytomyr Oblast Location within Ukraine
- Country: Ukraine
- Oblast: Zhytomyr Oblast
- Raion: Zviahel Raion
- Time zone: UTC+2 (EET)
  - Summer (DST): UTC+3 (EEST)

Polianka (Ukrainian: Полянка) is a rural settlement in Zviahel Raion, Zhytomyr Oblast, Ukraine. It has a population of 1,580 (2022 estimate).

== History ==
It was a village in the Novograd-Volynsky Uyezd of the Volhynian Governorate of the Russian Empire.

In January 1989 the population was 1750 people.

Until 26 January 2024, Polianka was designated urban-type settlement. On this day, a new law entered into force which abolished this status, and Polianka became a rural settlement.
