= Cherniakhiv, Zhytomyr Oblast =

Rural locality in Zhytomyr Oblast, Ukraine

Cherniakhiv Черняхів
- Rural settlement
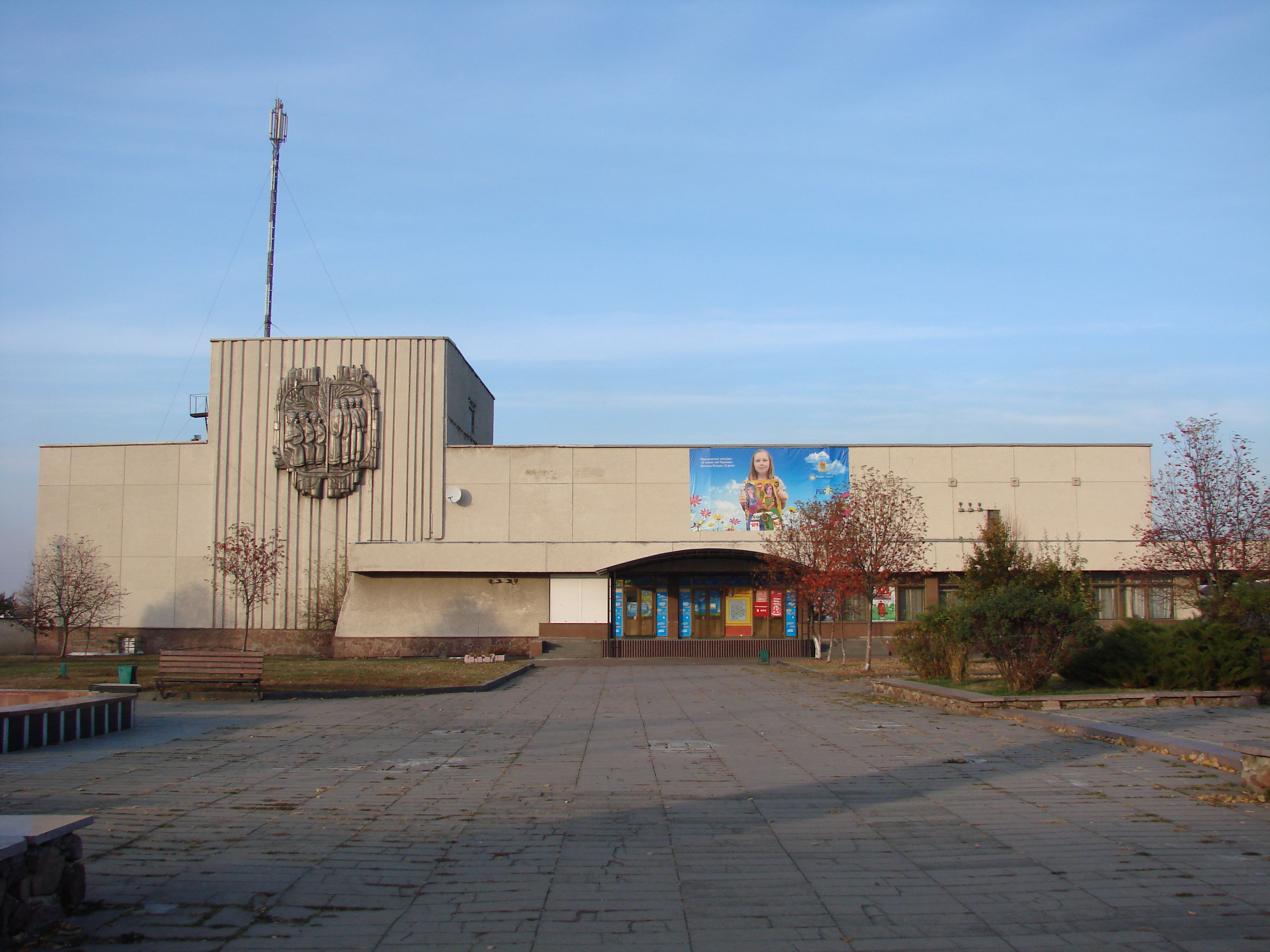
- House of culture in Cherniakhiv

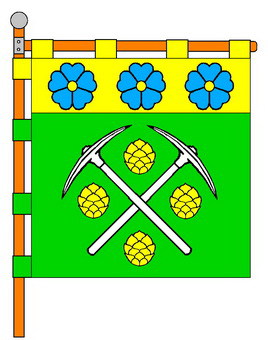
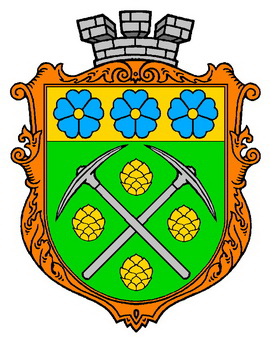
- Flag Coat of arms

- Location in Zhytomyr Oblast Location in Ukraine
- Coordinates: 50°27′18″N 28°39′55″E
- Country: Ukraine
- Oblast: Zhytomyr Oblast
- Raion: Zhytomyr Raion

Area
  - Total: 12 km^{2} (4.6 sq mi)

Population (2022)
  - Total: 9,132
- Time zone: UTC+2 (EET)
  - Summer (DST): UTC+3 (EEST)

Cherniakhiv (Ukrainian: Черняхів) is a rural settlement in Zhytomyr Raion, Zhytomyr Oblast, Ukraine. Population: 8,848 (2024 estimate) In 2001, population was 10,416.

== History ==
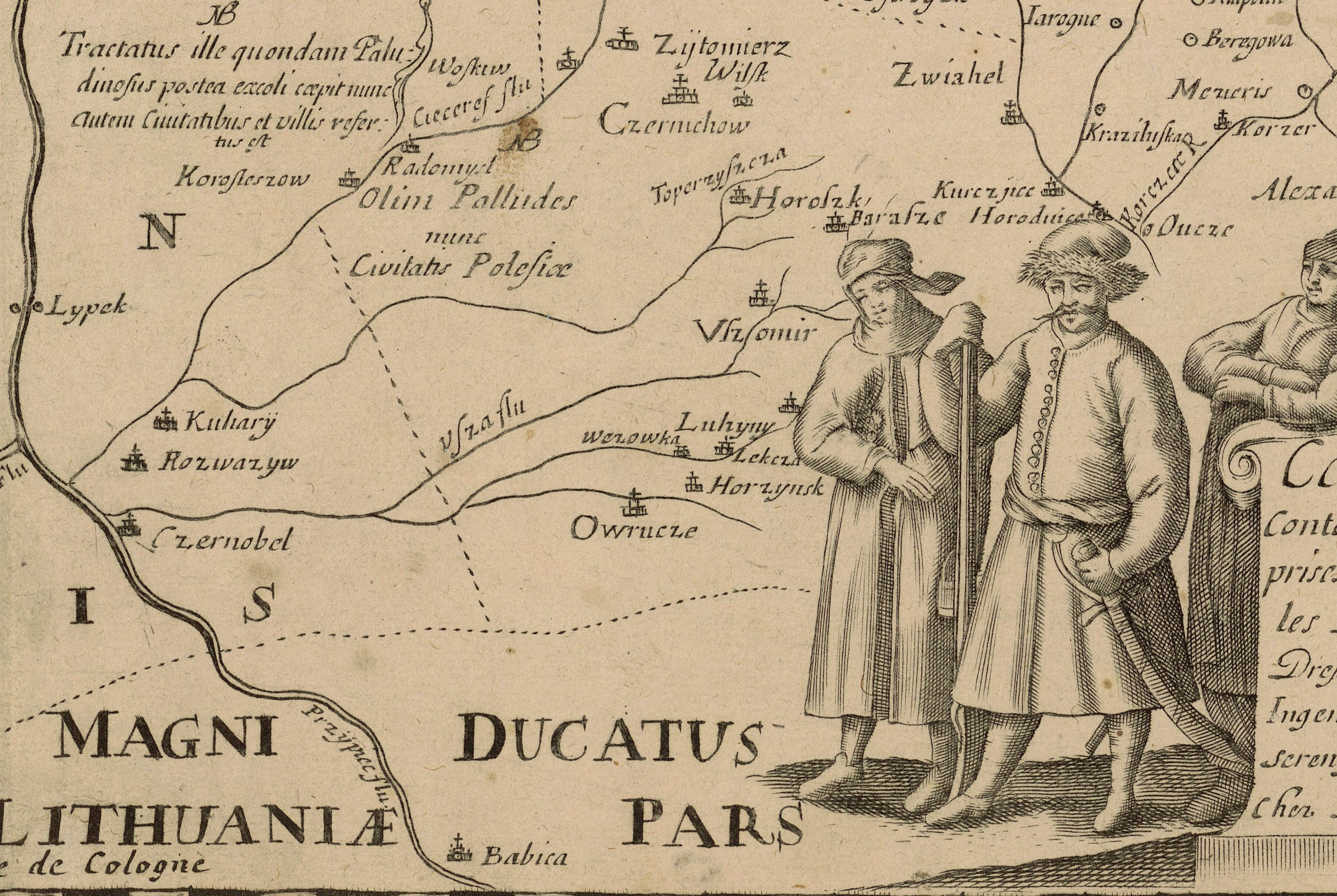
17th-century map with Czernichów marked

From the 16th century to the early 19th century, it was the home estate of the Niemirycz family. As of 1552 it was a settlement, and by 1600 it was a town. Around 1611, the Niemyricz family established an Arian school in the town.

During World War II, it was occupied by Germany from July 1941 to December 1943. On August 9th 1941, 110 Jews and Communists were shot. On August 20th, another 31 Jews were shot.

It was the administrative center of Cherniakhiv Raion until the raion was abolished in 2020. Until 26 January 2024, Cherniakhiv was designated urban-type settlement. On this day, a new law entered into force which abolished this status, and Cherniakhiv became a rural settlement.

== Notable people ==
- Nicefor Czernichowski, Polish soldier and adventurer, founder of Jaxa
