= Cherniakhiv Raion =

Former subdivision of Zhytomyr Oblast, Ukraine

Cherniakhiv Raion Черняхівський район
- Raion
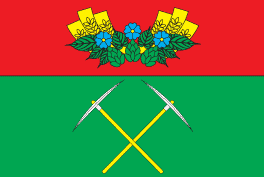
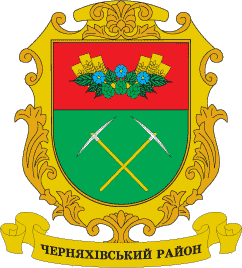
- Flag Coat of arms

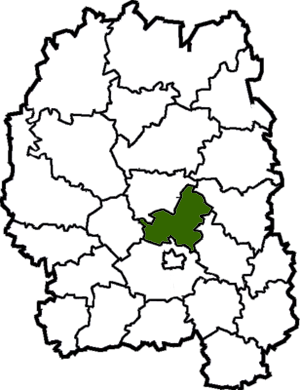
- Coordinates: 50°27′24″N 28°40′43″E
- Country: Ukraine
- Oblast: Zhytomyr Oblast
- Disestablished: 19 July 2020
- Admin. center: Cherniakhiv
- Subdivisions: List: 0 — city councils; 2 — settlement councils; — rural councils; Number of localities: 0 — cities; 2 — urban-type settlements; — villages; — rural settlements

Area
  - Total: 850 km^{2} (330 sq mi)

Population (2020)
  - Total: 27,464 ▼
  - Density: 32/km^{2} (84/sq mi)
- Time zone: UTC+02:00 (EET)
  - Summer (DST): UTC+03:00 (EEST)
- Area code: +380

Cherniakhiv Raion (Ukrainian: Черняхівський район) was a raion (district) of Zhytomyr Oblast, northern Ukraine. Its administrative centre was located at Cherniakhiv. The raion covered an area of 850 square kilometres (330 mi^{2}). The raion was abolished on 19 July 2020 as part of the administrative reform of Ukraine, which reduced the number of raions of Zhytomyr Oblast to four. The area of Cherniakhiv Raion was merged into Zhytomyr Raion. The last estimate of the raion population was 27,464 (2020 est.)
