= Zhytomyr Raion =

Subdivision of Zhytomyr Oblast, Ukraine

Zhytomyr Raion Житомирський район
- Raion
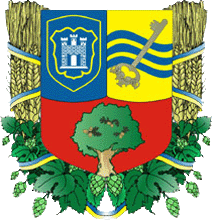
- Flag Coat of arms

- Coordinates: 50°12′17″N 28°38′55″E
- Country: Ukraine
- Oblast: Zhytomyr Oblast
- Admin. center: Zhytomyr
- Subdivisions: 31 hromadas

Area
  - Total: 1,441 km^{2} (556 sq mi)

Population (2022)
  - Total: 606,433
  - Density: 420.8/km^{2} (1,090/sq mi)
- Time zone: UTC+02:00 (EET)
  - Summer (DST): UTC+03:00 (EEST)
- Area code: +380

Zhytomyr Raion (Ukrainian: Житомирський район) is a raion (district) of Zhytomyr Oblast, northern Ukraine. Its administrative centre is located at Zhytomyr. The raion covers an area of 1,441 square kilometres (556 mi^{2}). Population: 606,433 (2022 estimate).

On 18 July 2020, as part of the administrative reform of Ukraine, the number of raions of Zhytomyr Oblast was reduced to four, and the area of Zhytomyr Raion was significantly expanded. Before the expansion, the area of the raion was 865.2 square kilometres (334.1 mi^{2}). The January 2020 estimate of the raion population was 72,213 (2020 est.).

In 1928-39, the territory of the modern district was known as the Troyanivskyi district with its center in the town of Troyaniv (now a small village).

== Geography ==
Zhytomyr district borders Korosten, Zviahel and Berdychiv raions of Zhytomyr Oblast, Kyiv and Rivne regions of Ukraine. The district is located on the Dnieper Upland and Polesian Lowland. The territory of the district is located in a zone of mixed forests, where pine, hornbeam, and oak are the most common. In the west of the district flows the Sluch River (Prypiat Basin), and from the southwest to the northeast through the territory of the district flows the Teterev River (Dnieper basin).

Mineral resources of the district: kaolin, granite, gabbro.

The climate of the Zhytomyr district is moderately continental, with humid summers and mild winters. The average annual temperature is approximately 10 °C, the average temperature in January is 4-5 °C, and in July it is about +20 °C. The annual amount of precipitation is 570 mm.

Zhytomyr is a large transport center that carries out cargo and passenger transportation by rail, road and air transport (until 02/24/2022). The city is European highways E583 and E40.

== Natural tourist objects ==
The natural reserve fund of the district consists of 3 parks of landscape art of local importance, Botanical Garden of Zhytomyr National Agroecological University

== Bibliography ==
- Національний атлас України/НАН України, Інститут географії, Державна служба геодезії, картографії та кадастру; голов. ред. Л. Г. Руденко; голова ред. кол.Б.Є. Патон. — К.: ДНВП «Картографія», 2007. — 435 с. — 5 тис.прим. — ISBN 978-966-475-067-4.
