= Telizhyntsi =

Village in Kyiv Oblast, Ukraine

Telizhyntsi Теліжинці
- Village
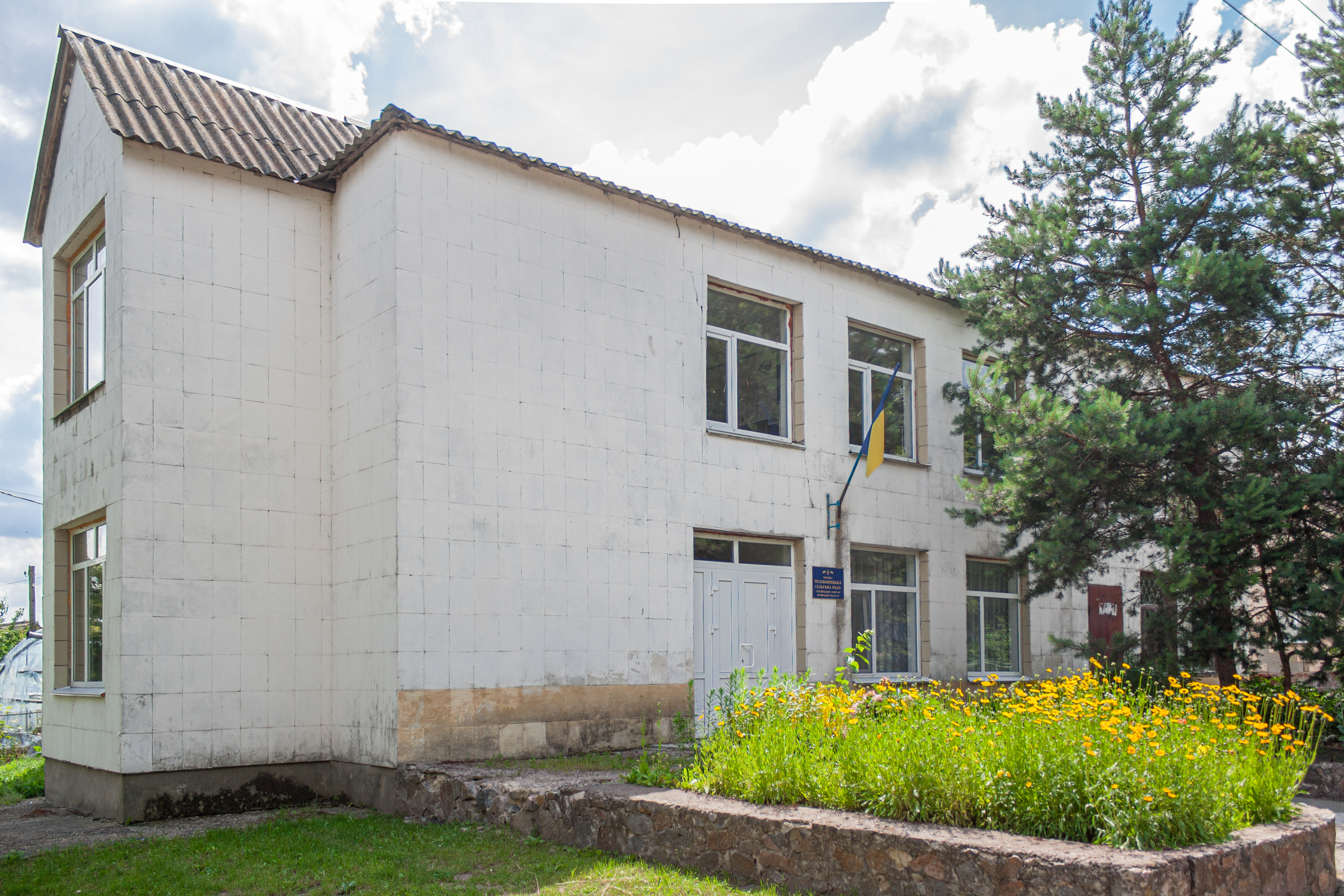
- Village council building

- Location within Kyiv Oblast Location within Ukraine
- Coordinates: 49°20′28″N 29°34′41″E
- Country: Ukraine
- Oblast: Kyiv Oblast
- Raion: Bila Tserkva Raion
- Hromada: Tetiiv urban hromada
- Founded: 1500

Government
  - Village Head: Ihor Doroshuk

Population
  - Total: 985
- Time zone: UTC+2 (EET)
  - Summer (DST): UTC+3 (EEST)
- Postal code: 09822
- Area code: +380 4560
- Website: rada.info/rada/04361255/

Telizhyntsi (Ukrainian: Теліжинці) is a village in Bila Tserkva Raion, Ukraine. It is located on the Ros'ka River, 9 km southwest of Tetiiv. Telizhyntsi belongs to Tetiiv urban hromada, one of the hromadas of Ukraine.

== History ==
In 1860s there was 1558 people in the village. There was a black forest to the west of village. Villagers believed that it stood on ruins of an old Greek city, destroyed by Tatars. In 1844, a clay vessel, containing burned bones. About a Kilometer away, on the right bank of Ros'ka river, were visible remains of an old castle. There was a church built in 1725. A new one was built in 1789 and restored in 1857.

Until 18 July 2020, Telizhyntsi belonged to Tetiiv Raion. The raion was abolished in July 2020 as part of the administrative reform of Ukraine, which reduced the number of raions of Kyiv Oblast to seven. The area of Tetiiv Raion was merged into Bila Tserkva Raion.

== People ==
- Ivan Drach (1936–2018), a Ukrainian poet, screenwriter, literary critic, politician, and political activist.
- Oleksiy Seniuk (1974-2022), a Ukrainian veteran of the Russo-Ukrainian War, Hero of Ukraine.

== Gallery ==
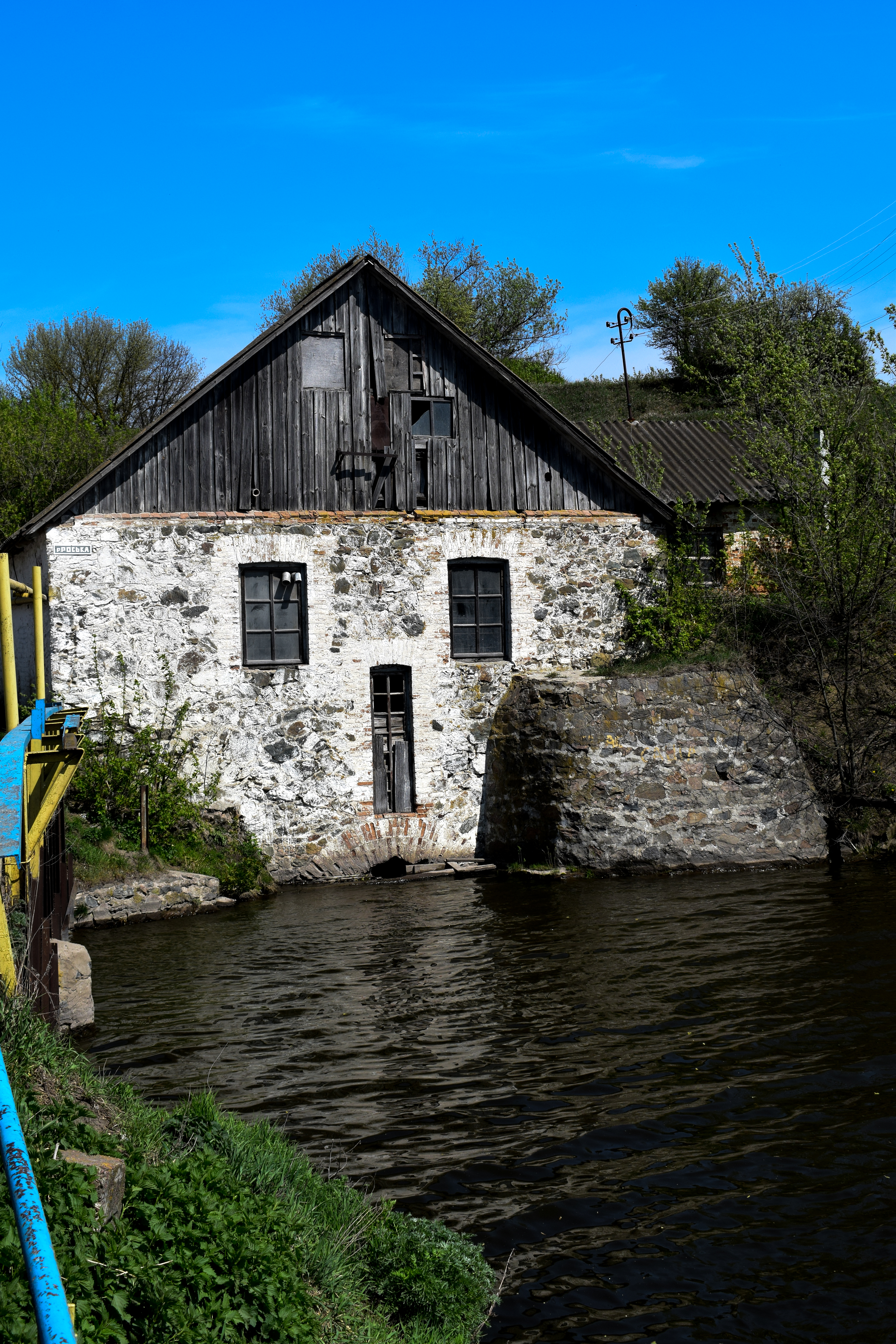
Grist mill

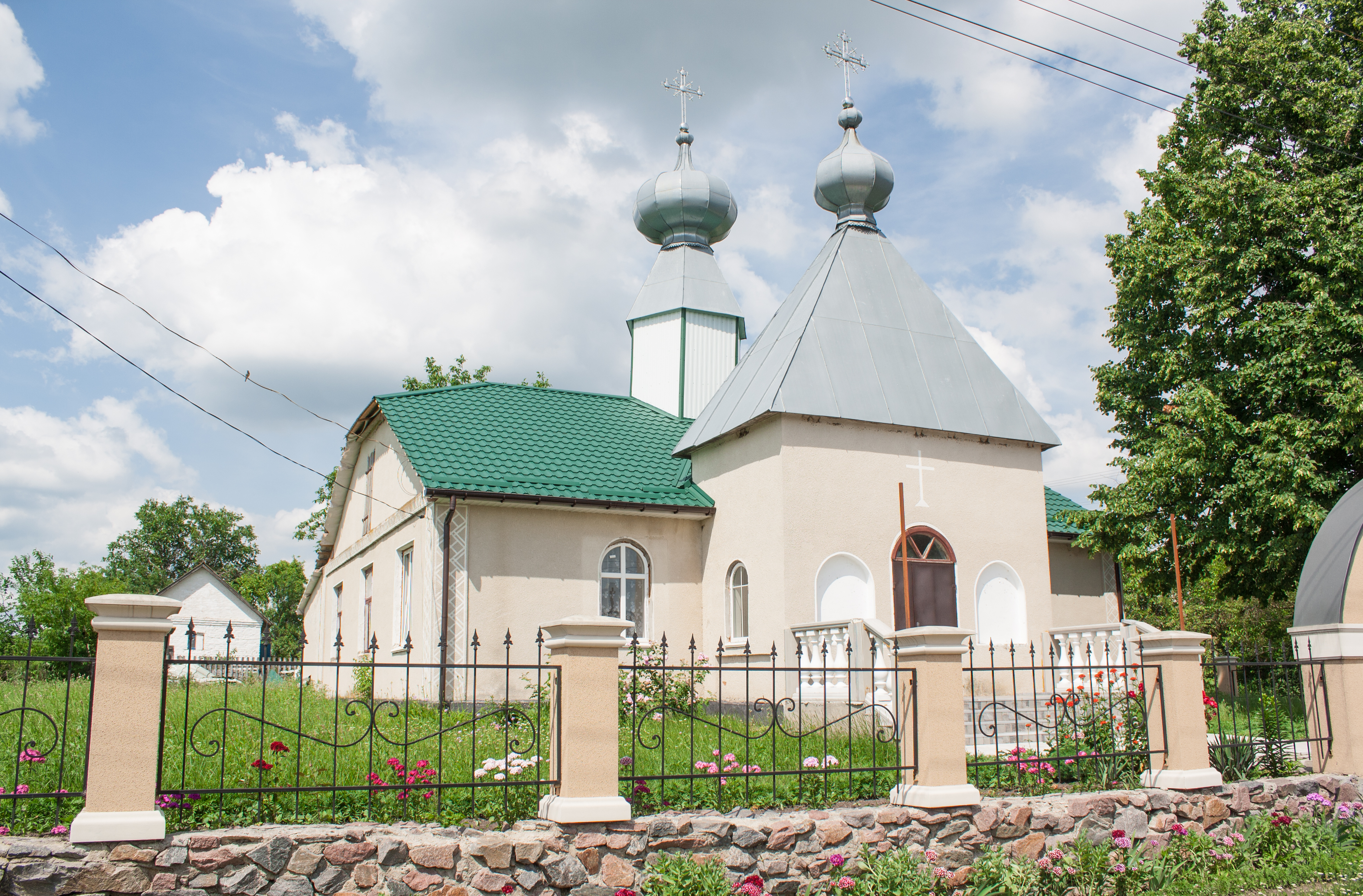
Church

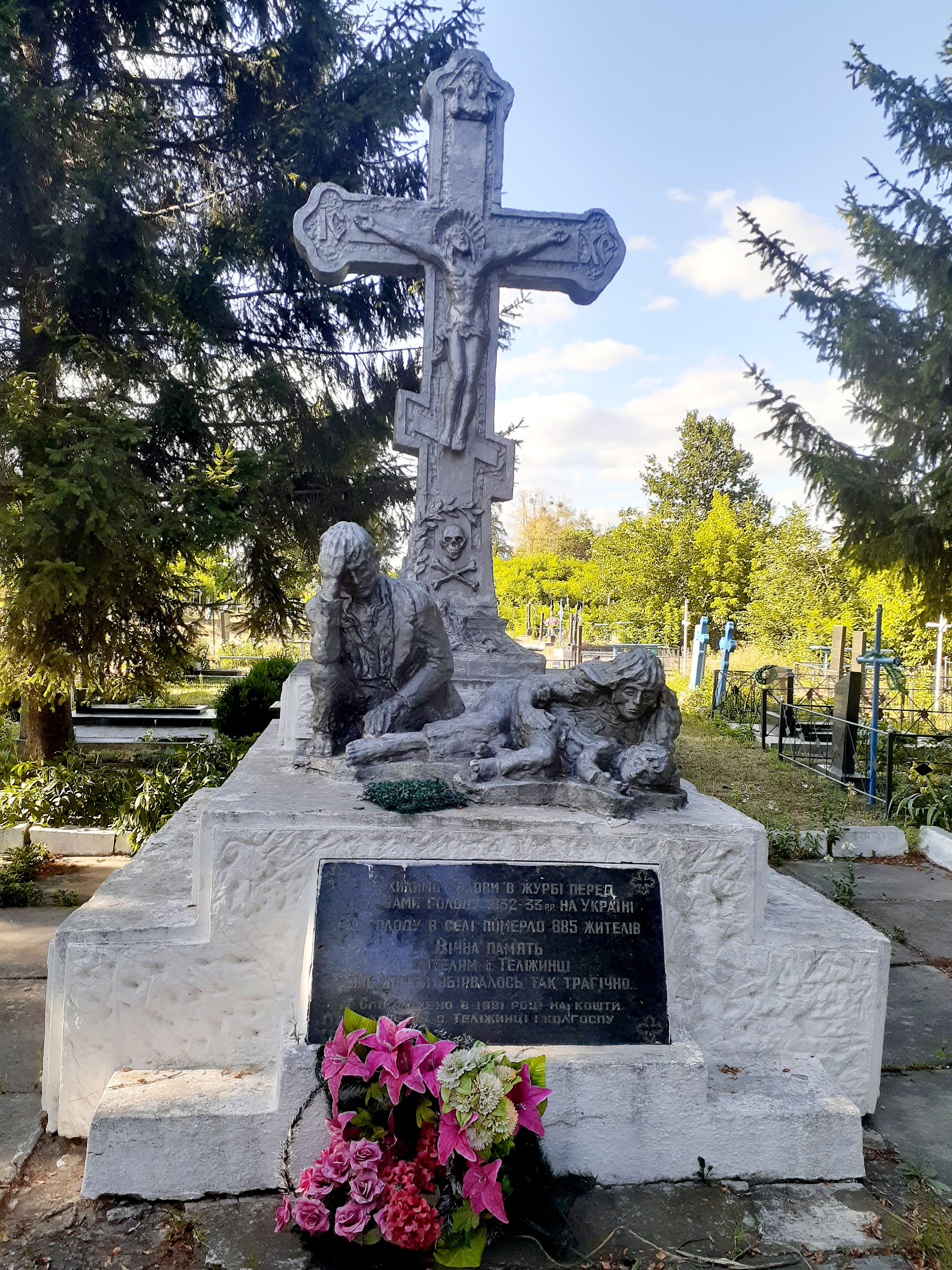
Holodomor Memorial
