= Denykhivka =

Denykhivka Денихівка
- Village
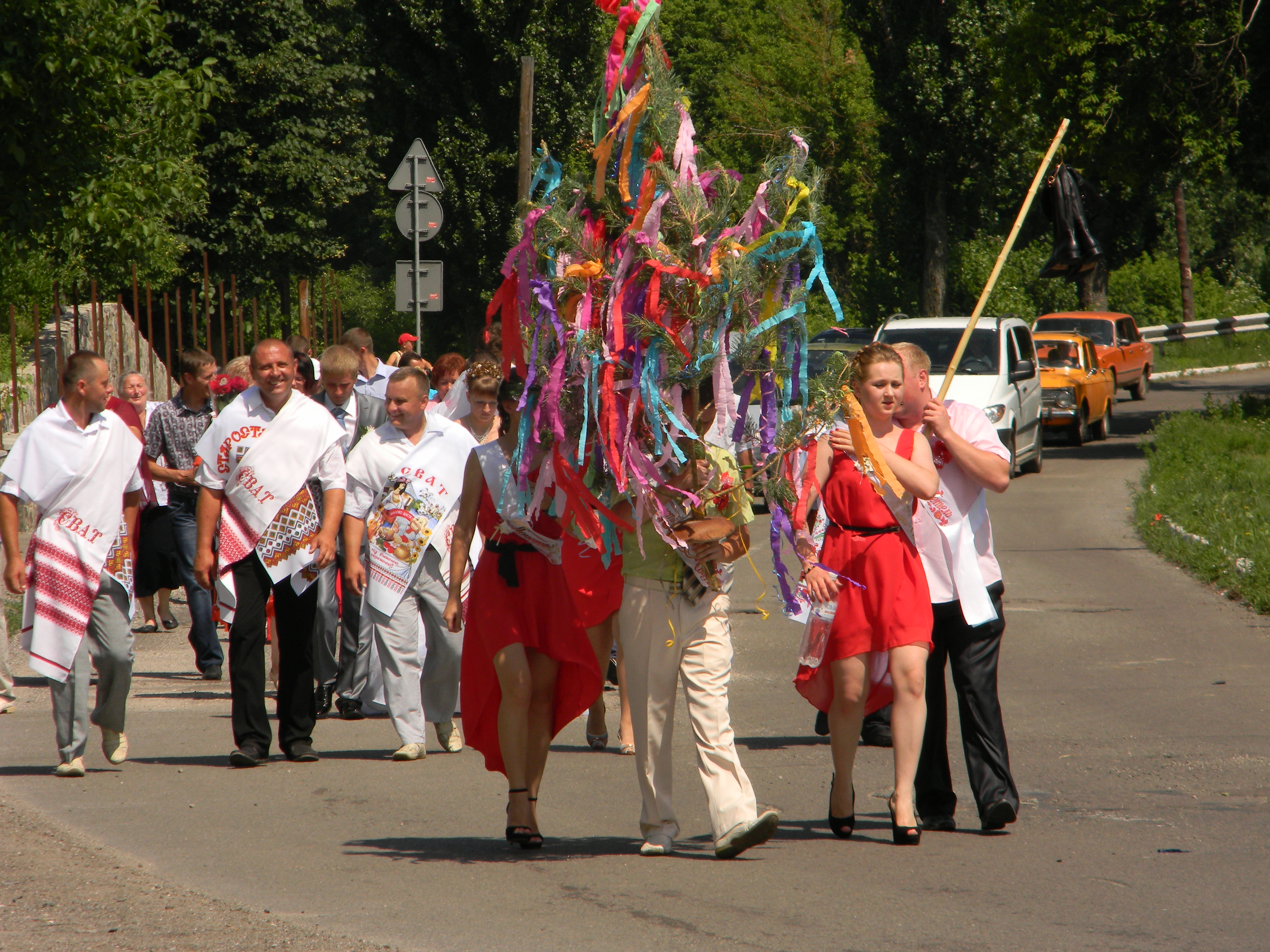
- Wedding, center of Denykhivka, June 2013

- Location within Kyiv Oblast Location within Ukraine
- Coordinates: 49°18′5″N 29°48′9″E
- Country: Ukraine
- Oblast: Kyiv Oblast
- Raion: Bila Tserkva Raion
- Hromada: Tetiiv urban hromada

Area
  - Total: 3,885 km^{2} (1,500 sq mi)

Population (01.07.2021)
  - Total: 1,715
  - Density: 0.4414/km^{2} (1.143/sq mi)
- Time zone: UTC+2 (EET)
  - Summer (DST): UTC+3 (EEST)

Denykhivka is a village in Ukraine, which is part of the Tetiiv urban hromada in Bila Tserkva Raion, Kyiv oblast. The village name is related to Polish magnate nobility Dönhoff, particularly Konstancja Sanguszko.

== Description ==
It is located on both banks of the Dubravka River (a right tributary of the Roska River) near the administrative border between Kyiv and Cherkasy oblasts, 12 km (7.5 mi) southeast of the city of Tetiiv. The village is also located right next to the village of Dibrivka. On the outskirts of Denykhivka is the Denhofivka train station. The population is 1,715 people (as of July 1, 2021).

The village appeared during the times of the Polish-Lithuanian Commonwealth. It appeared in the realm of the Ostrogski family, which was later passed down to the Sanguszko family. Following the Second Partition of Poland, it was annexed by the Russian Empire.

At the end of the 19th century, in a village existed a sugar beet factory, which was taken over by the Soviet regime in the 1920s in the process of "nationalization".

During the Soviet regime, the village survived Holodomor with no fewer than 398 residents dying from it.

During the World War II, the village for a few years was occupied by the Armed Forces of Nazi Germany.

=== Sport ===
The Ukrainian football club Denhoff is based in Denykhivka and competes at regional competitions.

== Notable people ==
- Casimir Markievicz, Polish painter, playwright, and veteran of the Imperial Russian Army

== Gallery ==
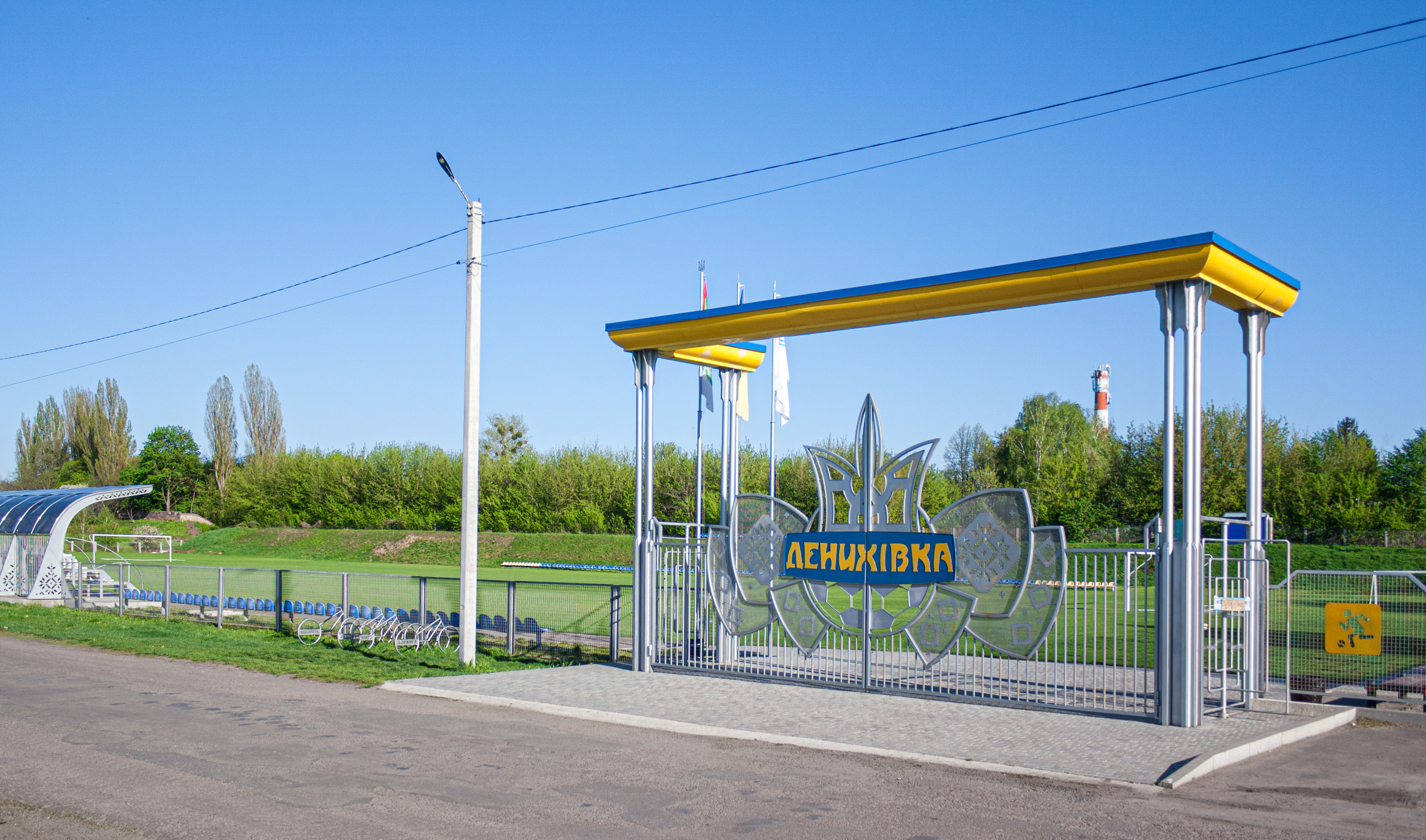
local stadium

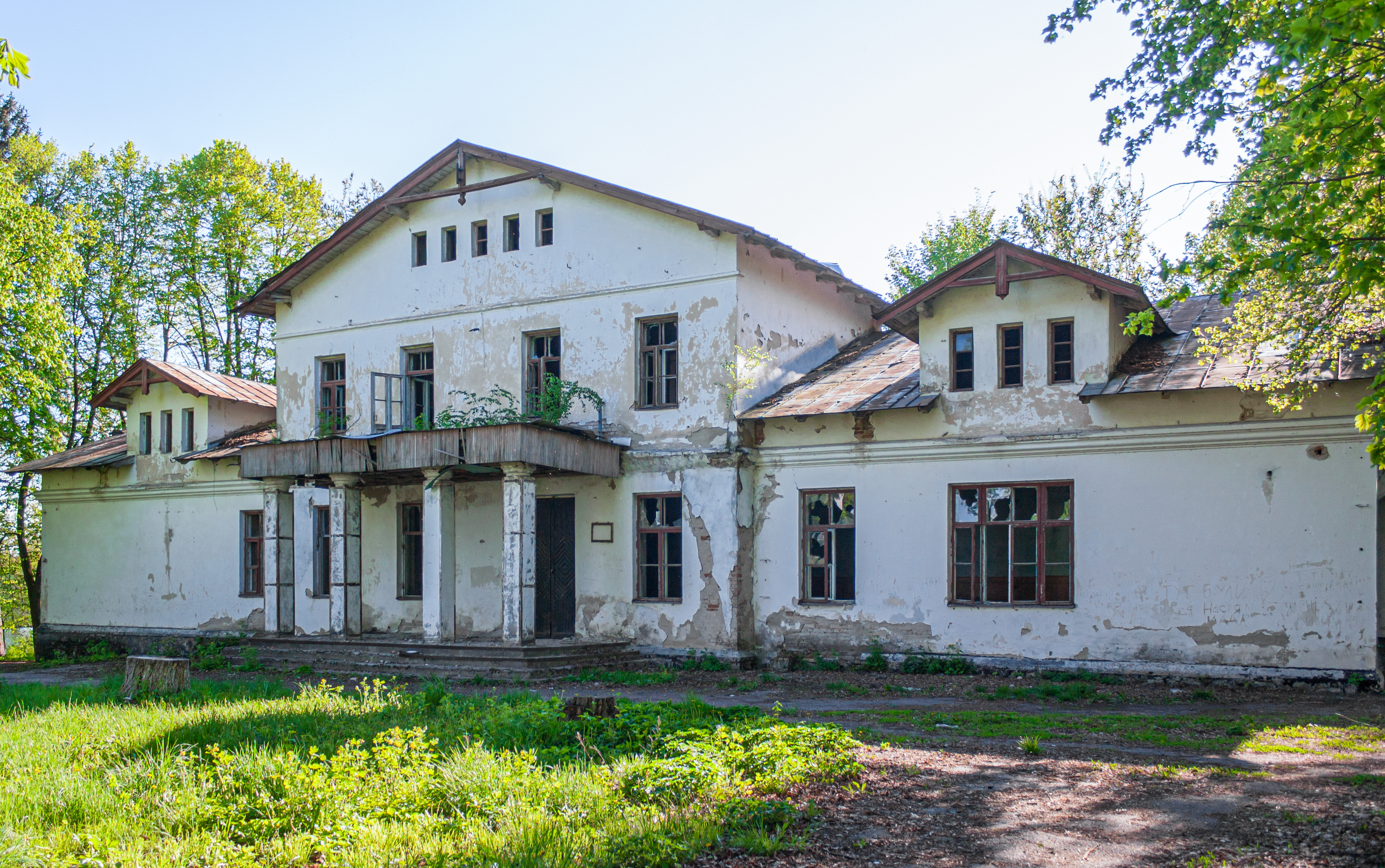
central office of the sugar beet factory (1899)

== See also ==
- List of settlements affected by the Holodomor of 1932–1933 (Kyiv Oblast)
