= Oleksii Seniuk =

Ukrainian soldier, Hero of Ukraine (1974–2022)

- Олексій Олександрович Сенюк
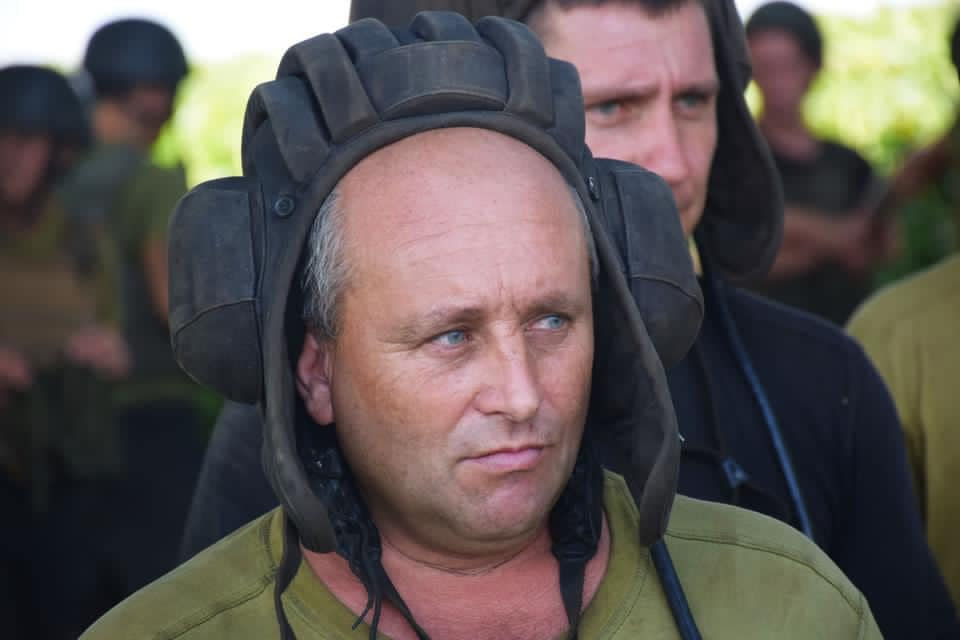
- Born: Oleksii Oleksandrovych Seniuk; 24 December 1974; Telizhyntsi, Kyiv Oblast, Ukrainian SSR, Soviet Union
- Died: 27 February 2022 (aged 47); Chernihiv, Ukraine
- Spouse: Iryna Seniuk
- Children: 2
- Military career
- Allegiance: Ukraine
- Branch: Ukrainian Ground Forces
- Service years: 2014–2022
- Rank: Chief sergeant
- Unit: 1st Tank Brigade
- Conflicts: Russo-Ukrainian War; War in Donbas; Russian invasion of Ukraine; Siege of Chernihiv †
- Awards: Order of the Gold Star (posthumously)

Oleksii Oleksandrovych Seniuk (Ukrainian: Олексі́й Олекса́ндрович Сеню́к; 24 December 1974 – 27 February 2022) was a Ukrainian veteran of the Russo-Ukrainian War. He was killed by Russian Armed Forces in the Siege of Chernihiv on 27 February 2022 during the Russian invasion of Ukraine. He was posthumously awarded the Order of Gold Star.

== Early life ==
Oleksii Seniuk was born on 24 December 1974 in the village of Telizhyntsi (currently part of Tetiiv hromada) Bila Tserkva Raion of Kyiv Oblast. After finishing school, he worked as a builder.

== Military career ==
He did his 18 month mandatory conscription service during 1990s.

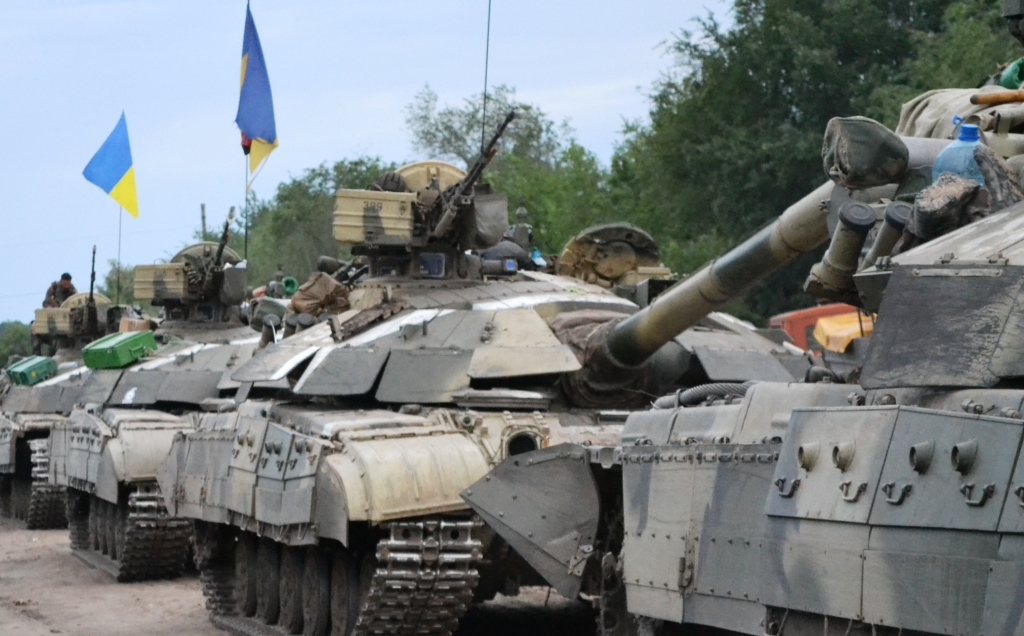
T-64BMs in Eastern Ukraine in 2014

When War in Donbas began in 2014, Oleksii joined the army, as a volunteer at first. Later he signed a contract and became a soldier in 3rd Company 1st Tank Brigade. He took part in multiple battles operating T-64BV and T-64BM "Bulat" tanks. In 2016, for his courage and heroism Oleksii was awarded Order for Courage III degree. In November 2016, after returning from ATO Zone, he visited No.29 school and Kharkiv National University of Internal Affairs to share his memories and experiences during combat. As he was promoted, he served as a tank commander. His call sign was Puma.

When Russian invasion of Ukraine began on 24 February, Oleksii held the rank of Chief sergeant and together with his unit was tasked with defending city of Chernihiv. In 3 days of heavy fighting he destroyed 2 Russian BMP's. Oleksii also managed to capture an enemy T-72 main battle tank. On 26 February, Oleksii together with other soldiers from 1st Tank Brigade, was defending outskirts of Chernihiv. They were positioned in vicinity of Epicentr K shopping center. Next day, enemy hit Ukrainian positions near the center, with a rocket. Soon after, enemy began an artillery barrage of those same positions using 152mm caliber. Oleksii's friend Lieutenant Colonel Artem Linkov was sustained an injury to the head. Artem witnessed the death of his friend Oleksii. Artillery shells hit Oleksii's T-64. He screamed that he was burning. Tanks rounds began to cook off, causing Oleksii's body to be ejected from the tank. It was first reported in March that Oleksii was killed during an airstrike. Oleksii died on the birthday of one of his daughters. Because of heavy fighting during Siege of Chernihiv, his body was only recovered 45 days after his death.

Oleksii was buried on 12 April 2022 in Nosivka. He is survived by his wife Iryna and 2 daughters, Angelina and Daniella.

During 28 June 2023 on 27th anniversary of Ukraine's Constitution President Volodymyr Zelenskyy handed the Gold Star of the Hero of Ukraine award to Iryna, wife of Oleksii.

== Awards ==
- The title of "Hero of Ukraine" with the deigning Order of the Golden Star (2 March 2022, posthumously) for personal courage and heroism shown in defending the state sovereignty and territorial integrity of Ukraine, loyalty to the military oath.
- Order for Courage III degree (2 December 2016) for personal contribution to strengthening the defense capabilities of Ukrainian state, courage, dedication and high professionalism, shown during military service, and on the occasion of the Day of the Armed Forces of Ukraine.

== Posthumous honors ==
To honor his heroism, Chernihiv City Council's working group on renaming proposed to rename one of the streets to Oleksii Seniuk street, in June 2022. Chernihiv city website listed Kurs'ka Street as the street to be renamed. On 9 February 2023, Chernihiv City Council released a list streets which they plan to rename. Hrybojedova street will become Oleksii Seniuk street. Current street is named for Alexander Griboyedov, a Russian diplomat, playwright, poet, and composer. Hrybojedova street was renamed Oleksii Seniuk street by Chernihiv City Council on 9 February 2023.

== Sources ==
- Задверняк, Наталія (May 6, 2022), "Більше за все на світі чоловік любив своїх донечок Ангеліну та Даніелу, а також Україну" [Most of all, the man loved his daughters Angelina and Daniella, as well as Ukraine] (PDF), “Ukrainske Slovo” (in Ukrainian), vol. 18, no. 961, Hoffman Estates, IL, p. 24
- Галич, Григорий (2022), "О Геройском противостоянии Украины Агрессору" [About Ukraine's Heroic Resistance to the Aggressor], “Shalom” (in Russian), vol. 7, no. 479, Chicago, IL, p. 15
- Savchenko, Oleksandr (2022), "Сенюк Олексій Олександрович" [Oleksiy Oleksandrovych Seniuk], Encyclopedia of History of Ukraine (in Ukrainian), Naukova Dumka
