= Ivan Drach =

Ukrainian writer, politician and activist (1936–2018)

HOU OS Ivan Drach
- Іван Драч
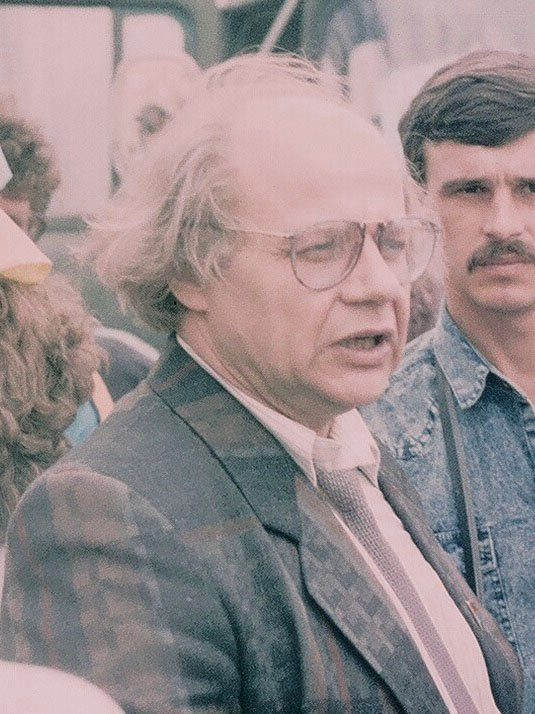
- Drach in 1990
- Born: 17 October 1936; Telizhyntsi, Kyiv Oblast, Ukrainian SSR, Soviet Union
- Died: 19 June 2018 (aged 81); Kyiv, Ukraine
- Education: Taras Shevchenko National University of Kyiv
- Occupations: Poet; screenwriter; politician; political activist
- Known for: human rights activism with participation in the Soviet dissident movement and People's Movement of Ukraine
- Political party: People's Movement of Ukraine
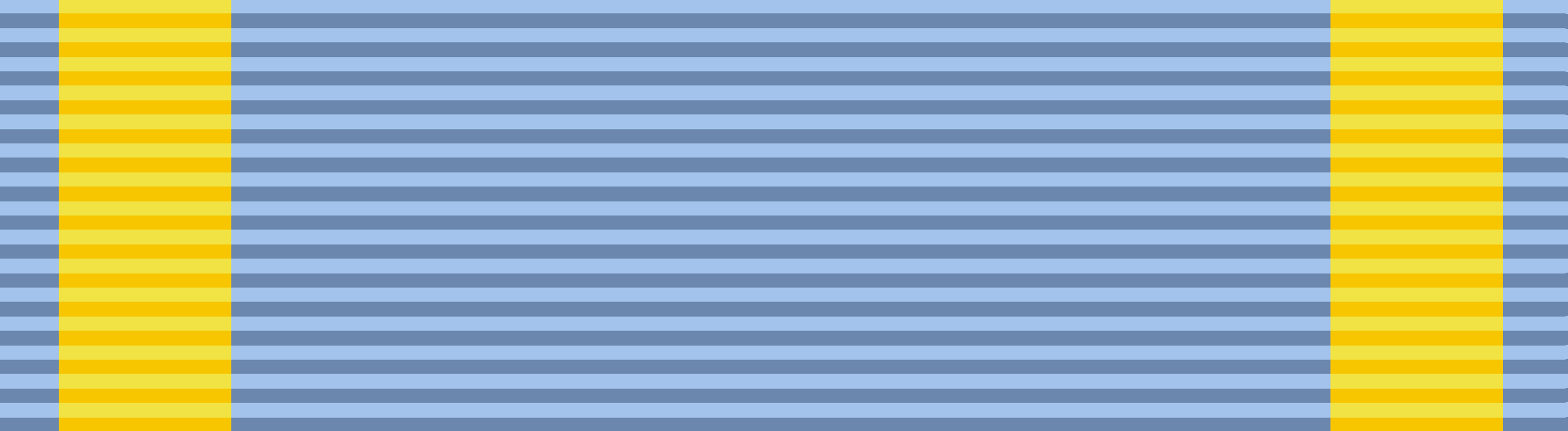
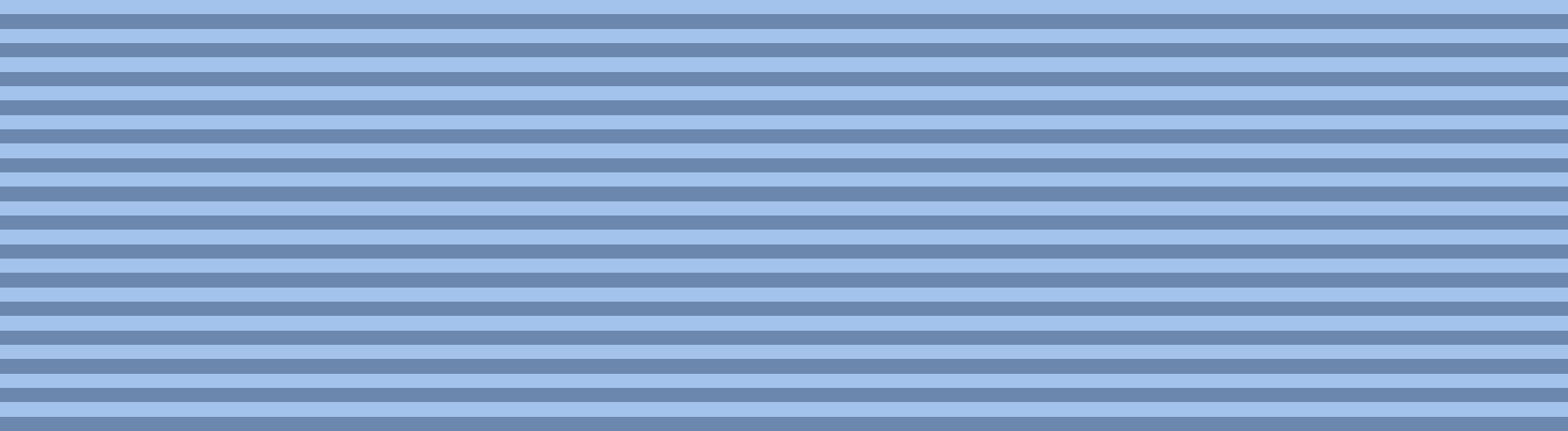
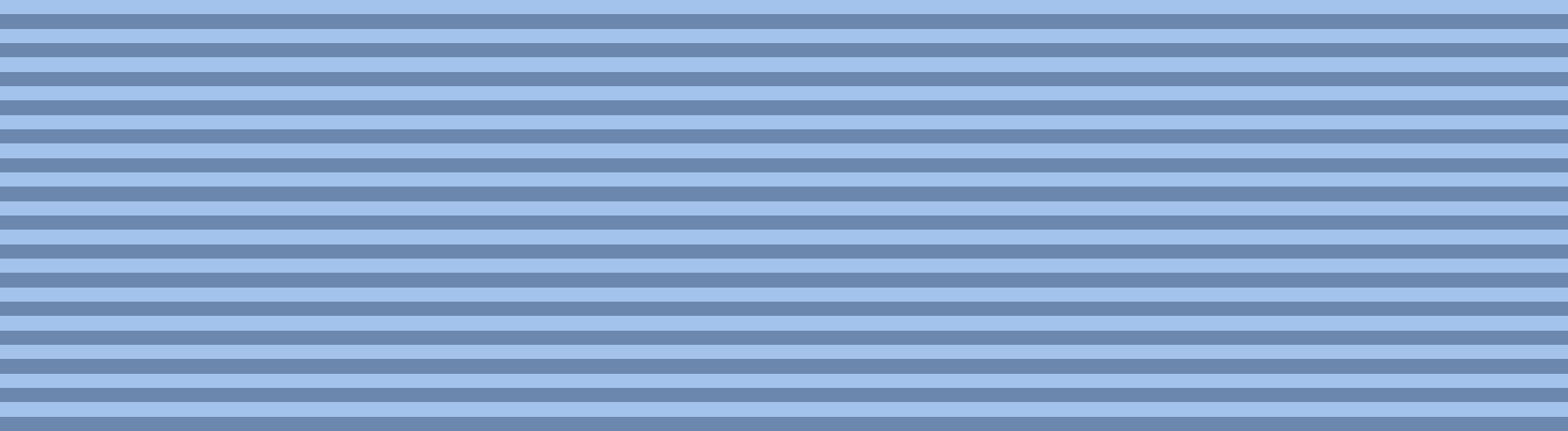
- Awards: USSR State Prize; Order of the Red Banner of Labour; Shevchenko National Prize; Antonovych Prize

Ivan Fedorovych Drach (Ukrainian: Іван Федорович Драч; 17 October 1936 – 19 June 2018) was a Ukrainian poet, screenwriter, literary critic, politician, and political activist.

Drach played an important role in the founding of Rukh – the People's Movement of Ukraine – and led the organisation from 1989 to 1992.

== Biography ==
Ivan Drach was born 17 October 1936, in Telizhyntsi, Kyiv Oblast, Ukrainian SSR and died in 2018 at the age of 81.

=== Early life ===
Drach was born to a family of collective farmers His father worked in a beet sugar refinery and Drach's mother worked on a farm.

=== Education ===
After finishing high school, Ivan Drach complied with military service, after which he studied in the Faculty of Language and Literature of Kyiv University from 1959 to 1963. Drach would write in his diaries and then note in later interviews that students at University looked down on him for his peasantry and Ukrainian language.

=== Poetry career ===
At this time, Drach visited the popular "Klub tvorchoyi molodi" (Ukrainian: Клуб творчої молоді) ["Club for Creative Young People" (CCY)] and took part in literary evenings with reading of innovative poems. The Club started in the period of Khrushchev thaw became a gathering place of a Ukrainian Nationalism movement in Literature and Arts known as the Sixtiers.

Drach made his debut in 1961 with the publication of his poem-tragedy Knife in the Sun in the Kyiv literary newspaper. He worked in the newspapers "Literary Ukraine" and "Fatherland." Ivan Dziuba introduced Knife in the Sun in Literaturna hazeta as a sign the last vestiges of Stalinism were falling.

In January 1962, Ivan Drach spoke at the Third Plenum of the Ukrainian Writers' Union. Toles Honchar, Soviet Ukrainian poet-laureate and president of the Union welcomed the Sixtiers to the Union and Drach served as unofficial spokesperson for the young poets:

create the art of communism, of which Soviet Ukrainian will form a part; that young intellectuals are enthusiastic about Western European and that several "forgotten" Ukrainian writers and artists of the past ought to be remembered and treated with dignity.

On 20 March 1962, Ivan Drach, and three other members of the Shestydesiatnyky were invited to join the Ukrainian Writer's Union. They would then hold literary events that were well attended. Then following a meetÍng of the Presidium of the Ukrainian Writers Union on 23 June 1962 party officials bagan a crackdown. At the meeting At this meeting the editors of the Journal's "Vitchyzna", "Prapor" and "Dnipro" and the newspaper "Literaturna Ukraina" were chastised for letting authors deviate from socialist realism.

At the Fourth Plenary Session of the Soviet Writers' Union, in March 1963, Drach fell under criticism of Leonid Novychenk who compared Drach to Yevhen Yevtushenkoa a Russian poet of Ukrainian background who Novychenk calle a " very uneducated man, both generally and in the sense of Marxist education, and Marxist worldview."

On 8 April 1963, the Central Committee of the Communist Party of Ukraine (CPU) condemned Drach because "Ukrainian bourgeois nationalistic counter-revolutionaries abroad" spread his poetry. At Kievan Writers' Organization held in April 1963 the rejection of the Sixtiers was complete. Drach's work was singled out as "confused" and for being published by bourgeois nationalists in the West. In response Drach published a satirical poem "Ode to an Honest Coward."

Drach complied with new reality and his second collection of poetry "Solar Prominences of the Heart" was noted by critics as returning to social realism and losing the literary devices and focusing on transmitting important socialist ideals. Other shestydesiatnyky did not follow suit, and many were arrested. Drach spoke up against these arrests, and in fact mentioned them while speaking at the United Nations. Legend has it Drach escaped his KGB handlers in New York City and wandered into a Cafe where he met Alan Ginsberg.

The Fifth Congress of the Ukrainian Hriters' Union, held in November 1966 would defend Drach's work and declare it free of formalism and literary twists. Drach's later work, once complying with Party demands is considered to have declined in quality.

Drach also worked as a screenwriter in the film studio O.P. Dovzhenko. He wrote A Spring for the Thirsty; filmed in 1965. The film was not released until 1987 after it was censored by the Soviet government.

In 1976, he won the USSR State Prize for his work, The Root and the Crown. In the aftermath of the 1986 Chernobyl disaster, Drach was involved in a growing movement of Ukrainian dissident intellectuals that demanded larger cultural autonomy for Ukraine and an honest conversation in the Soviet Union about the stalinist government's actions in Ukraine, particularly the Holodomor.

After the beginning of Perestroika, he resumed contacts with dissident circles. Together with Vyacheslav Chornovil, Mykhailo Horyn, and a number of other Ukrainian activists, in 1989 he created Rukh or People's Movement of Ukraine, first official Ukrainian pro-reform organization. Ivan Drach was the first chairman of Rukh from 8 September 1989 to 28 February 1992.

=== Political career ===
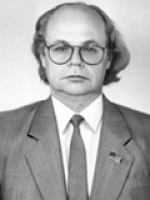
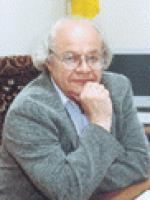
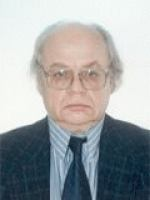
Official Verkhovna Rada portraits of Drach from 1990, 1998, and 2002

He was co-chairman of the NRU with Chornovil and Horyn from 28 February to 4 December 1992. In the spring of 1990, Ivan Drach was elected to the Verkhovna Rada from Artemivsk (No. 259) constituency by the 66.38% of voters. After retiring from his office in the NRU in late 1992, Ivan Drach retired from politics in 1994. He promoted the use of the Ukrainian language and whilst serving as Ukraine's minister of communication, he proposed wide-ranging measures, including setting quotas for Ukrainian-language broadcasts and tax breaks for Ukrainian publishing.

At the 29 March 1998 elections to the Verkhovna Rada, member Drach (NRU party) ran for parliament from Ternopil (No. 167) constituency and voting results (21.04% of the vote), the second time he was elected to Parliament. In the parliamentary elections of March 2002, Drach appeared in the Our Ukraine party at number 31. Thus, the third time he became a deputy. After a long dispute with the party leadership NRU, Drach in March 2005 left the party and joined the Ukrainian People's Party Yuri Kostenko. In the parliamentary elections of 26 March 2006, he was number 14 on the electoral list "Ukrainian National Bloc of Kostenko and the Ivy". But the bloc lost the election and Drach was not elected to Parliament.

From August 1992 to 19 May 2000, he headed the Ukrainian World Coordinating Council. Other positions included the chairmanship of the Ukrainian Intelligentsia Congress and heading the Writers' Union.

=== Death ===
Ivan Drach died 19 June 2018 in Feofania Hospital, Kyiv, following an undisclosed illness. Drach requested to be buried next to the grave of his son Maksym in his native Telizhyntsi.

== Art and philosophy ==
Drach began his creative path during the "Khrushchev thaw" and came to see Ukrainian nationalism as a revolutionary cause, that required purging Leninism of its Stalinist distortions. Ivan Drach explored Ukrainian nationality and Soviet socialism noting: "a true Leninist had to have a real national idea." As a faithful Kosomol member Drach was initially surprised by the criticism he received from Party officials following 1962. By 1963, however, Drach had adopted a more dissident tone.

Drach, according to interviews drew on many sources. World War II, Taras Shevchenko, Alexander Pushkin, Walt whitman and Pablo Neruda played the strongest role informing his style. Drach also said Francisco Goya, Pablo Picasso, and Marc Chagall as influences, as well as other modern poets in different languages.

He made his debut in 1961, when the Kyiv Literary Gazette published his poem-tragedy Knife in the Sun. Seeing himself as someone striving for universal socialism by returning to Leninist norms, Drach wrote entire cycles of poems dedicated to Lenin and the Communist Party to which he belonged. His works were known in the USSR and abroad. His poetry has been translated into Russian (several separate editions), Belarusian, Azerbaijani, Latvian, Moldavian, Polish, Czech, German and other languages.

== Awards ==
- Hero of Ukraine (19 August 2006).
- Order of Prince Yaroslav the Wise 3rd class (17 October 2011).
- Order of Prince Yaroslav the Wise 4th class (19 August 2001).
- Order of Prince Yaroslav the Wise 5th class (16 October 1996).
- Antonovych prize (1991)
- USSR State Prize (1976)
- Order of the Red Banner of Labor (16 November 1984)

== Poetry collections ==
- Soniashnyk' (The Sunflower, 1962)
- Protuberantsi sertsia' (Protuberances of the Heart, 1965)
- Poeziï (Poems, 1967)
- Balady budniv (Everyday Ballads, 1967)
- Do dzherel (To the Sources, 1972)
- Korin' i krona (The Root and the Crown, 1974)
- Kyïvs'ke nebo (The Kyivan Sky, 1976)
- Duma pro vchytelia (Duma about the Teacher, 1977)
- Soniashnyi feniks (The Solar Phoenix, 1978)
- Sontse i slovo (The Sun and the Word, 1979)
- Amerykans'kyi zoshyt (American Notebook, 1980)
- Shablia i khustyna (The Saber and the Kerchief, 1981)
- Dramatychni poemy (Dramatic Poems, 1982)
- Kyïvs'kyi oberih (A Kyivan Amulet, 1983)
- Telizhentsi (1985), Khram sontsia (A Temple of the Sun, 1988)
- Lyst do kalyny (A Letter to a Viburnum Tree, 1990)
- Vohon' iz popelu (Fire from the Ashes, 1995)

== Movies screenwriting ==
- Propala Hramota

== See also ==
- List of heroes of Ukraine
- People's Movement of Ukraine
