= Casimir Markievicz =

Polish playwright, theatre director, and painter (1874–1932)

- Self-portrait of Markievicz
- Born: Kazimierz Józef Dunin-Markiewicz; 15 March 1874; Denychiwka, Kiev Governorate, Russian Empire
- Died: 2 December 1932 (aged 58); Warsaw, Second Polish Republic
- Education: Kyiv Imperial University of Saint Vladimir; École des Beaux-Arts; Académie Julian
- Occupations: Playwright; Painter; theatre director; scenic designer
- Spouses: Jadwiga Neyman (died 1899); Constance Markievicz (m. 1900; died 1927)
- Children: 3

Casimir Dunin-Markievicz (Polish: Kazimierz Józef Dunin-Markiewicz [kaˈʑimjɛʐ ˈduɲin marˈkʲɛvit͡ʂ]; Ukrainian: Казімєж-Юзеф Маркевич-Дунін; 15 March 1874 – 2 December 1932), known as Count Markievicz, was a Polish painter, scenic designer, playwright, theatre director and the husband of the Irish revolutionary Constance Markievicz.

== Early life and family ==
Markievicz was born on 15 March 1874 in Denhofowka, Kiev Governorate (present-day Denykhivka, Ukraine). He was one of nine children of Piotr Dunin-Markiewicz, a landowner and nobleman, and Maria Chrzaszczewska. Descended from landowners and horse breeders of the Polonised Lithuanian gentry (Polish: Szlachta), Markievicz grew up at his family's estate in Żywotówka, Podolia Governorate (present-day Zhyvotivka, Ukraine). Educated at the State Gymnasium in Kherson, Markievicz was later sent to Kyiv to study law. In 1892, Markievicz began studying law at the Kyiv Imperial University of Saint Vladimir, as well as attending the drawing school of Mykola Murashko. Whilst in Kyiv, Markievicz met his future wife Jadwiga Splawa Neyman. (Note: Also cited as Jadwiga Neyman.)

Settling in Paris in 1895 (Note: Also cited as 1894.), Markievicz studied at the École des Beaux-Arts and the Académie Julian. Neyman later joined Markievicz in Paris, under the pretense of studying music. The couple married and had two sons; Stanisław in 1896 and Ryszard in 1897. In 1896, Markievicz travelled to Saint Petersburg to undertake a year of voluntary military service. The couple began living separately by 1898, and following Neyman developing tuberculosis, Markievicz sent her and the children to live with her parents in Ukraine. Neyman died in 1899, and Ryszard died soon after. (Note: Neyman possibly died from peritonitis as a result of going into labour on a train to Ukraine, and she and newborn baby died shortly after arriving home.) Markievicz's eldest son remained in Ukraine, and lived with either his maternal or paternal grandparents.

The same year, Markievicz met Constance Gore-Booth at a ball. On 29 September 1900, Markievicz and Gore-Booth married in London; at a registry office, the Russian Empire Legation and St Marylebone Parish Church. The following year the couple's daughter, Maeve, was born at Lissadell House.

=== Title ===
Markievicz used the title of Count, as was common amongst the Polish gentry of the period. However, the legitimacy of this title remains debated. When Constance's family enquired as to the validity of the title, they were informed through Pyotr Rachkovsky of the Tsarist Secret Police that Markievicz had taken the title "without right", and that there had never been a "Count Markievicz" in Poland. By contrast, the Department of Genealogy in Saint Petersburg said that he was entitled to claim to be a member of the Szlachta, of whom there were several hundred thousand in 1900.

In the 1911 Irish census, Markievicz gave his occupation as "Count (Russian nobility)" but Stanisław later said in a letter that his father had not been a count.

== Career ==
=== Paris ===
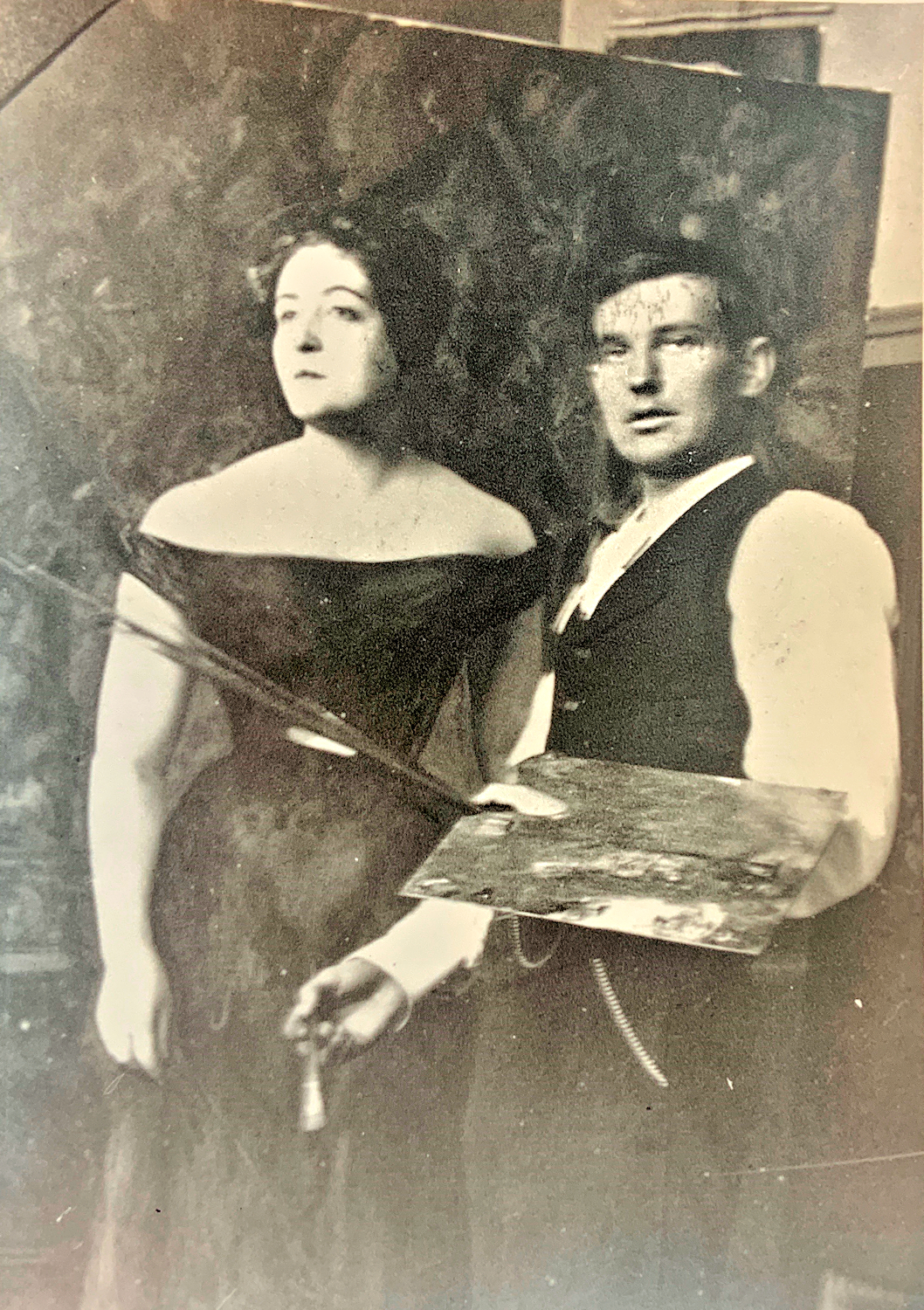
Markievicz in his studio, about 1900

In 1896, He exhibited a painting, The Travelling Beggar, at the Salon des indépendants, and two years later, at the same venue, he showed a number of portraits and a triptych, Bread. At the 1900 Paris Exposition he was awarded a medal of honour for the painting Amour, which was based on the legend of the fern flower, associated with Saint John's Eve. This brought him to the attention of the Grand Duke Vladimir Alexandrovich of Russia, and led to the painting being displayed in St Petersburg and Kraków in 1901.

=== Dublin ===
In 1902, Markievicz travelled with Constance to Paris, and then to visit his family in Żywotowka, where he painted family portraits and landscapes; they returned to Ireland via Paris in 1903, taking Casimir's son Stanislaw with them. They settled in Dublin where, through their acquaintance with George Russell (AE), they were introduced to the emerging artistic and literary society in the city. In October 1903, and again in August 1904, the Markieviczes and AE put on exhibitions in Dublin. The latter, titled Paintings from two Countries, included a large number of paintings by Casimir of both Ireland and Ukraine, including a portrait of AE. At this time, he also began to take on commissions, including a large group portrait, Investiture of the Right Hon. The Earl of Mayo as Knight of St. Patrick (1905).

In 1908, Markievicz formed the Independent Dramatic Company, which produced plays at the Abbey Theatre and the Gaiety Theatre. The company staged plays written by himself: first Seymour's Redemption; then The Dilettante, a co-production with the Theatre of Ireland, a rival company to the Abbey company. In 1910, with Constance, he wrote The Memory of the Dead, a melodrama centering on the 1798 Rebellion. Performed at the Abbey, it starred Constance and highlighted the role of women in the struggle for independence, containing the line, "if there are men in Ireland ready to die for their country, there are just as many women."

=== Poland ===
the "Łabędź", the coat of arms of the Markiewicz family (see Polish heraldry)

In 1913, Markievicz left Ireland, first travelling to Albania as a reporter, where he appears to have become an advisor to Prince William of Wied before leaving abruptly, showing up a short time later in Warsaw. Here, he stayed at the Bristol Hotel, and struck up a friendship with Arnold Szyfman of the nearby Polish Theatre.

He never returned to live in Ireland. However, he did correspond with his wife in Dublin and he was by her side when she died in 1927.

Towards the end of his life Markievicz was active in Warsaw, as well as a correspondent for British magazines, such as the Londoner Daily News. He also wrote the screenplay of a 1920 Polish film, Powrót, directed by Aleksander Hertz. His paintings included portraits, landscapes, and genre painting. The largest part of his art collection is held in Dublin, some remain in Poland (National Museum, Kraków, and in private collections). His talent lent itself particularly to the large oil portraits of two Polish statesmen: Marshal Piłsudski and Stanisław Wojciechowski. A catalogue for his works is still pending.

== Death ==
Markievicz died on 2 December 1932, in Warsaw.

== Plays ==
(Source: Productions of the Irish Theatre Movement, 1899-1916)

- Seymour's Redemption, Abbey Theatre, 9 March 1908
- The Dilettante, Abbey Theatre, 3 December 1908
- Home Sweet Home (with Nora Fitzpatrick), Abbey Theatre, 3 December 1908
- Dunin Markievicz, Casimir (1910). The Memory of the Dead: A Romantic Drama of '98, in Three Acts. Dublin: Tower Press., Abbey Theatre, 14 April 1910
- Mary, Abbey Theatre, 14 April 1910
- Rival Stars, Gaiety Theatre, 11 December 1911

== Sources ==
- Arrington, Lauren (2014). "Irlandzki Dramat Casimira Markiewicza: Anty-Imperializm I Awangarda W Dublinie" [Casimir Markiewicz's Irish Drama: Anti-Imperialism and the Avant-Garde in Dublin]. Acta Universitatis Lodziensis. Folia Litteraria Polonica (in Polish). 24 (2): 63–72.
- Quigley, Patrick (2022). Staśko Markiewicz: Between Ireland and Poland. Dublin. ISBN 978-83-7789-692-1.
- Ryan-Smolin, Wanda (1995). "Casimir Dunin Markievicz: Painter and Playwright". Irish Arts Review Yearbook. 11: 180–184.
