= Tetiiv urban hromada =

Tetiiv urban hromada Тетіївська міська громада
- Hromada
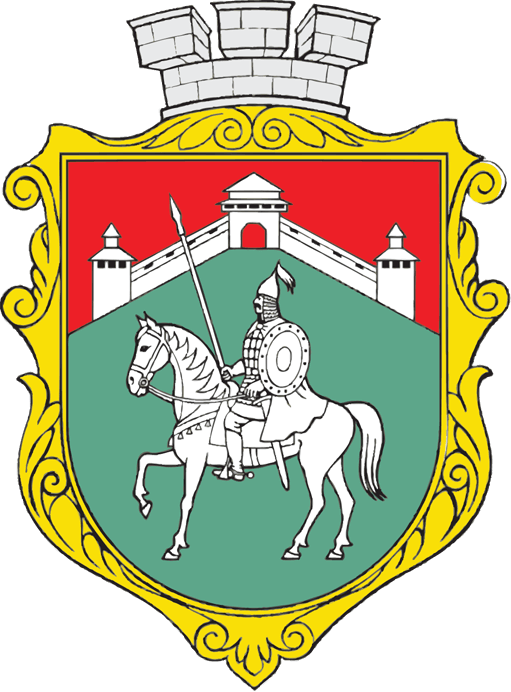
- Seal
- Interactive map of Tetiiv urban hromada
- Country: Ukraine
- Oblast: Kyiv
- Raion: Bila Tserkva

Area
  - Total: 756.6 km^{2} (292.1 sq mi)

Population (2020)
  - Total: 30,629
  - Density: 40.48/km^{2} (104.8/sq mi)
- Settlements: 33
- Cities: 1
- Villages: 32

Tetiiv urban hromada (Ukrainian: Тетіївська міська громада) is a hromada of Ukraine, located in Bila Tserkva Raion, Kyiv Oblast. Its administrative center is the city Tetiiv.

It has an area of 756.6 square kilometres (292.1 mi^{2}) and a population of 30,629, as of 2020.

The hromada contains 33 settlements: 1 city (Tetiiv), and 32 villages:

- Burkivtsi
- Vysoke
- Halaiky
- Holodky
- Horoshkiv
- Hryhorivka
- Denykhivka
- Dzveniache
- Dibrivka
- Dubyna
- Kashperivka
- Kliuky
- Koshiv
- Mykhailivka
- Molochne
- Nenadykha
- Odaipil
- Pershe Travnia
- Pohreby
- Piatyhory
- Ridenke
- Rosishky
- Skybyntsi
- Sofipil
- Stadnytsia
- Stepove
- Tainytsia
- Tarasivka
- Telizhyntsi
- Khmelivka
- Cherepyn
- Cherepynka

== See also ==
- List of hromadas of Ukraine
