= Tetiiv =

City in Kyiv Oblast, Ukraine

Tetiiv Тетіїв
- City
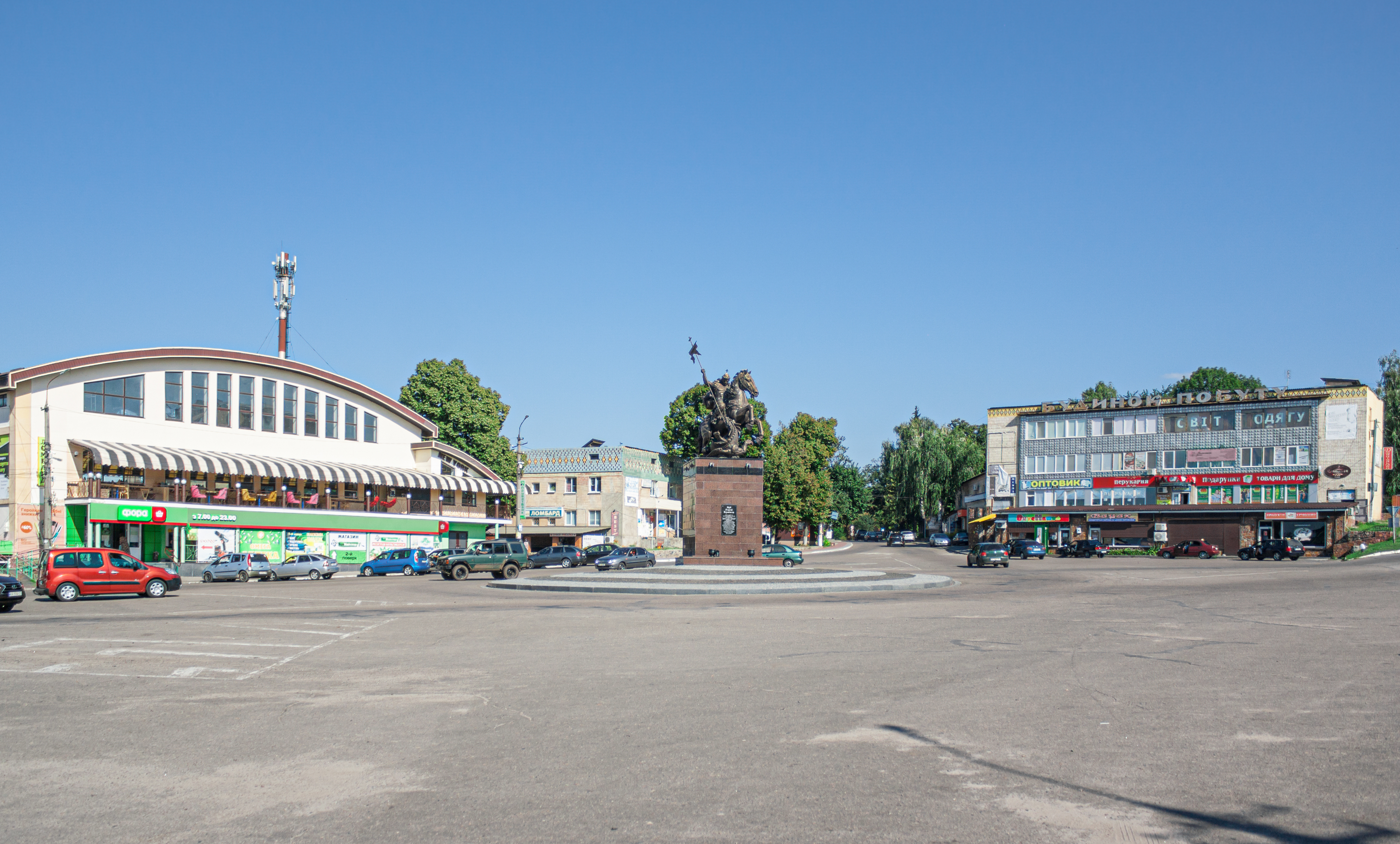
- Maidan Heroes' Square

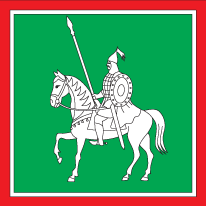
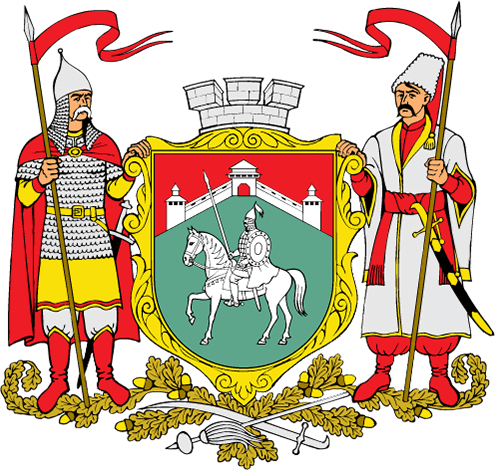
- Flag Coat of arms
- Interactive map of Tetiiv
- Location within Kyiv Oblast Location within Ukraine
- Coordinates: 49°22′15″N 29°41′24″E
- Country: Ukraine
- Oblast: Kyiv Oblast
- Raion: Bila Tserkva Raion
- Hromada: Tetiiv urban hromada
- Founded: 1185
- Town rights: 1606

Government
  - Mayor: Bohdan Balahura

Population (2022)
  - Total: 12,640
- Demonym: Tetiever
- Time zone: UTC+2 (EET)
  - Summer (DST): UTC+3 (EEST)
- Postal code: 09804
- Area code: +380 4560
- Website: www.tetiivmiskrada.gov.ua

Tetiiv (Ukrainian: Тетіїв, IPA: [teˈt⁽ʲ⁾ijiu̯]) or Tetiyev (Russian: Тетиев) is a city in Bila Tserkva Raion in the Kyiv Region in Ukraine. Tetiiv has a railway station on the Southwestern Railways Koziatyn - Zhashkiv line. It hosts the administration of Tetiiv urban hromada, one of the hromadas of Ukraine. The population is 12,640 (2022 estimate). The city is located on two banks of the Roska River, into which the right tributaries of the Rosishka and Dubravka flow.

== Transport ==
The main form of transportation is the Koziatyn-Zhashkiv railway, which passes through the city. There are two railway stations: Tetiiv and Sloboda Post, which are both located in the western part of the city.

== History ==
Tetyjów, as it was known in Polish, was granted Magdeburg town rights with a weekly market and two annual fairs by Polish King Sigismund III Vasa in 1606. It was a private town of the Ostrogski, Zasławski, Sanguszko, Leduchowski and Ostrowski noble families, administratively located in the Bracław County in the Bracław Voivodeship in the Lesser Poland Province of the Kingdom of Poland.

Tetiiv was first inhabited by Jews since the 17th century, with many members of the community dying in a massacre by Haydamaks in 1768. Despite this, Tetiiv continued to exist as a shtetl and held a 95% Jewish population in 1897.

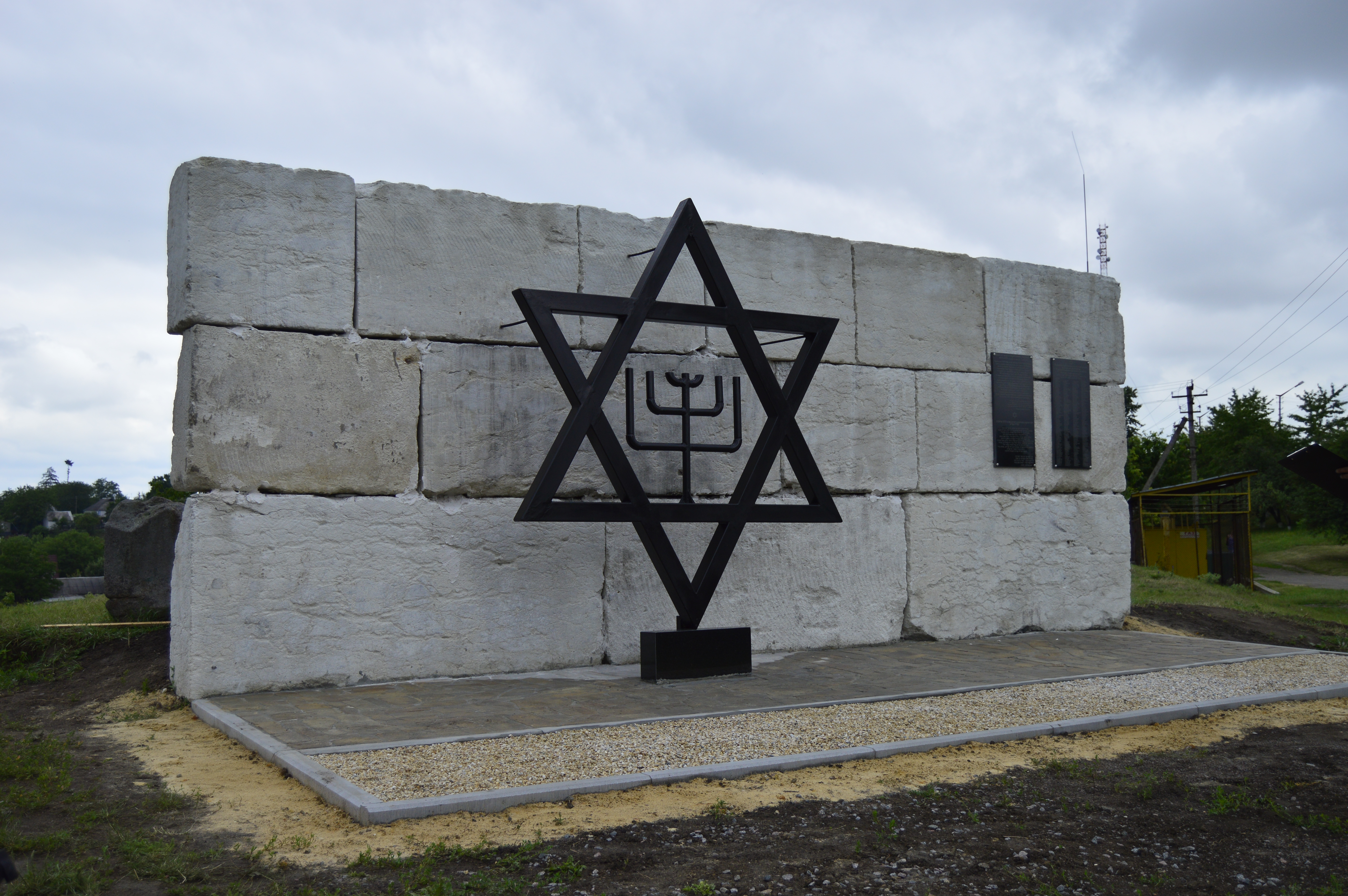
The Wailing Wall, a memorial to the victims of the Tetiyev pogroms of 1919-1920

In August 1919, Cossacks from the White Army ransacked the city, killing dozens of Jews. This was followed by a larger pogrom in March 1920, in which anti-Bolshevik insurgents went door to door destroying Jewish houses and killing civilians on sight, culminating in an arson attack on the synagogue while it housed 2,000 worshipers inside, followed by the gunning down of any survivors who tried to escape.

An estimated 3,000-4,000 Jews died due to the Tetiyev pogroms and the remaining Jewish population completely fled the city, only returning a decade later.

A significant diaspora from Tetiyev immigrated to Cleveland, Ohio, where they established the Oheb Zedek-Cedar Sinai Synagogue.

During World War II, the city was occupied by Nazi Germany from 1941 to 1944.

Until 18 July 2020, Tetiiv was the administrative center of Tetiiv Raion. The raion was abolished that day as part of the administrative reform of Ukraine, which reduced the number of raions of Kyiv Oblast to seven. The area of Tetiiva Raion was merged into Bila Tserkva Raion.

== Demographics ==
As of the 2001 Ukrainian census, Tetiiv had a population of 15,111 inhabitants. The distribution of the population by ethnicity and native language was as follows:

Ethnic groups in Tetiiv
| | percent |
| Ukrainians | 97.01% |
| Russians | 2.32% |
| Belarusians | 0.21% |
| Poles | 0.13% |
| Moldovans | 0.07% |
| others | 0.25% |

Languages in Tetiiv
| | percent |
| Ukrainian | 97.7% |
| Russian | 2.1% |
| Belarusian | 0.1% |
| Romanian | 0.1% |
| others | 0.0% |

== Sights ==
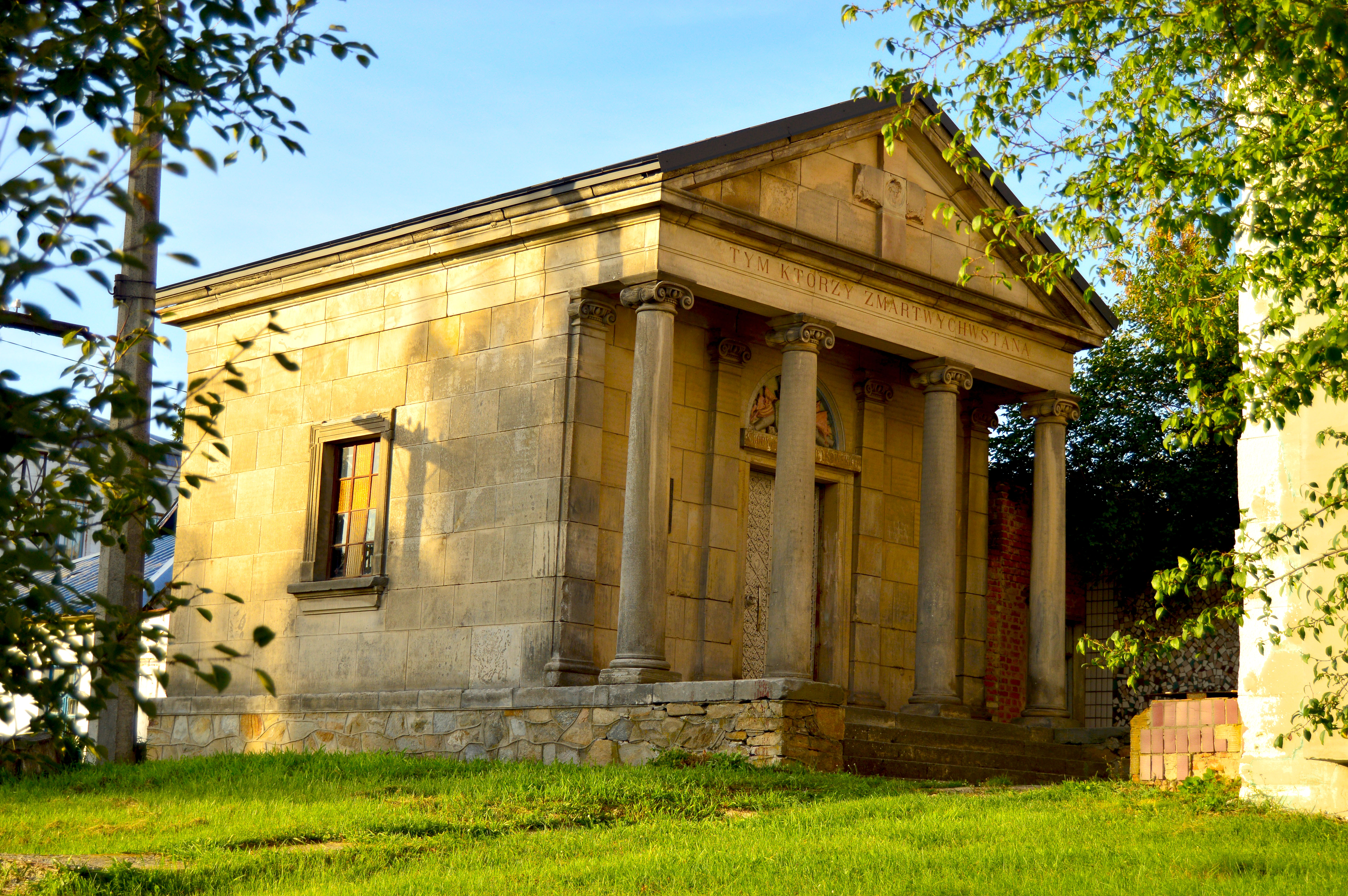
Świeykowski Chapel

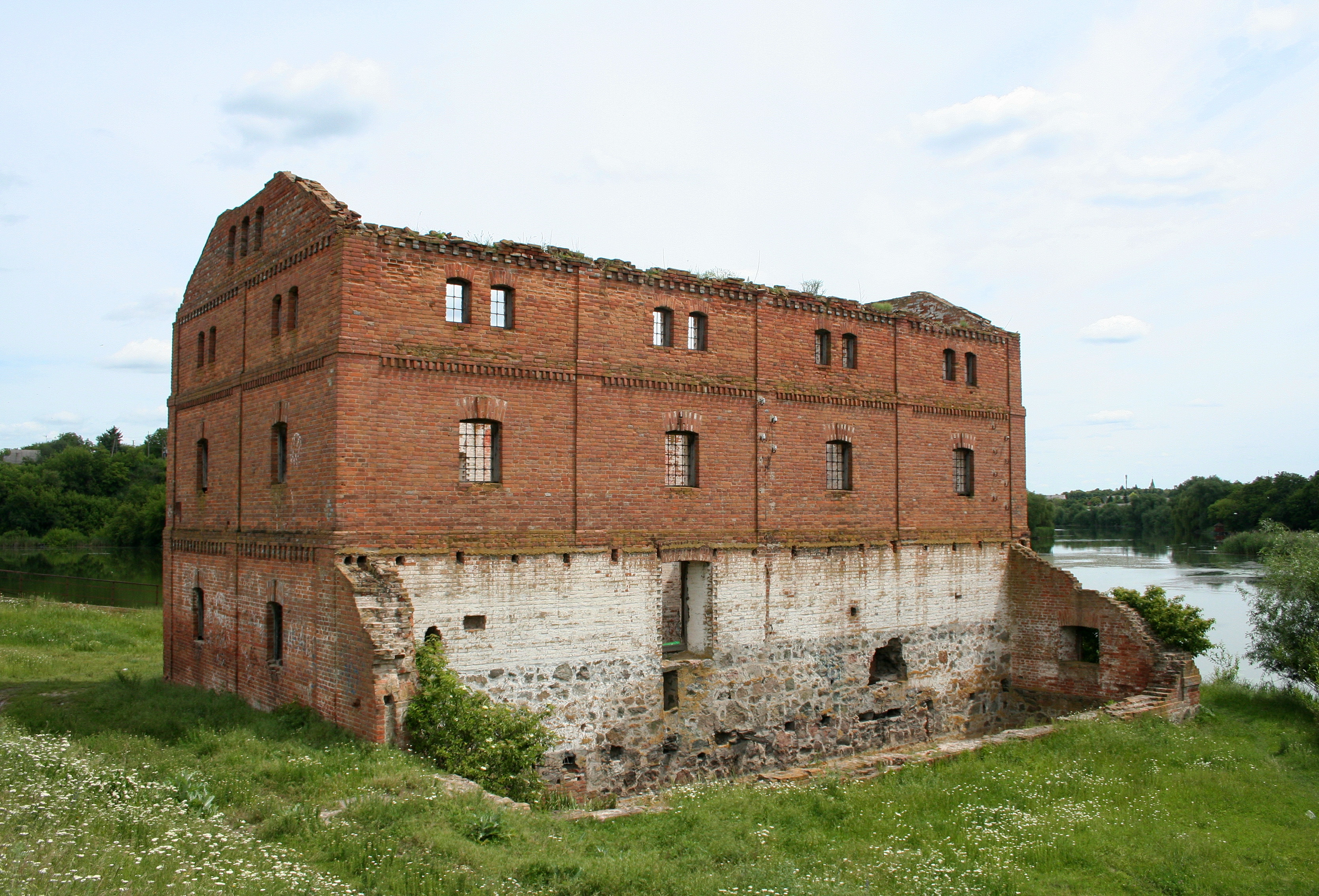
Porhun mill

- Świeykowski Chapel is a Polish Catholic stone church built at the beginning of the 19th century.
- The partially damaged Church of the Assumption of the Blessed Virgin Mary. The Geographical Dictionary of the Kingdom of Poland writes that ... "Latins have in Tetiiv their church a stone parish named after St. John of Nepomucen, Build in the current century (XIX)." In Soviet times, the church became part of the Electronmash factory.
- Monument to the Magdeburg Law, erected on May 2, 2016 in honor of the 410 anniversary of the receipt.
- Memorial on the site of the Tetiiv city hall
- Barrow "Red Grave", four ancient burial places
- Porhun mill, built in 1812
- Monument to the victims of the Holodomor of 1932-1933
- Monument to executed members of Koliivshchyna
- Monument to Andrew the First-Called
- Monument to Princess Olga
- Memorial at the city's old Jewish cemetery

== Politics ==
Since May 17, 2018, Tetiiv has been a member of the European Union's Mayors for Economic Growth Initiative. The city has made an emissions reduction program that intends to cut down on carbon emissions by 30% by 2030, with a long-term goal of 50%.

Since 2017, the Tetiiv City has been the administrative center of the Tetiiv city united territorial community. The community includes 13 counties.

Tetiiv is a member of the following organizations:

- Association of Ukrainian cities
- Association of United Territorial Communities

The mayor of Tetiiv is Bogdan Balagura.

== Local celebrations ==
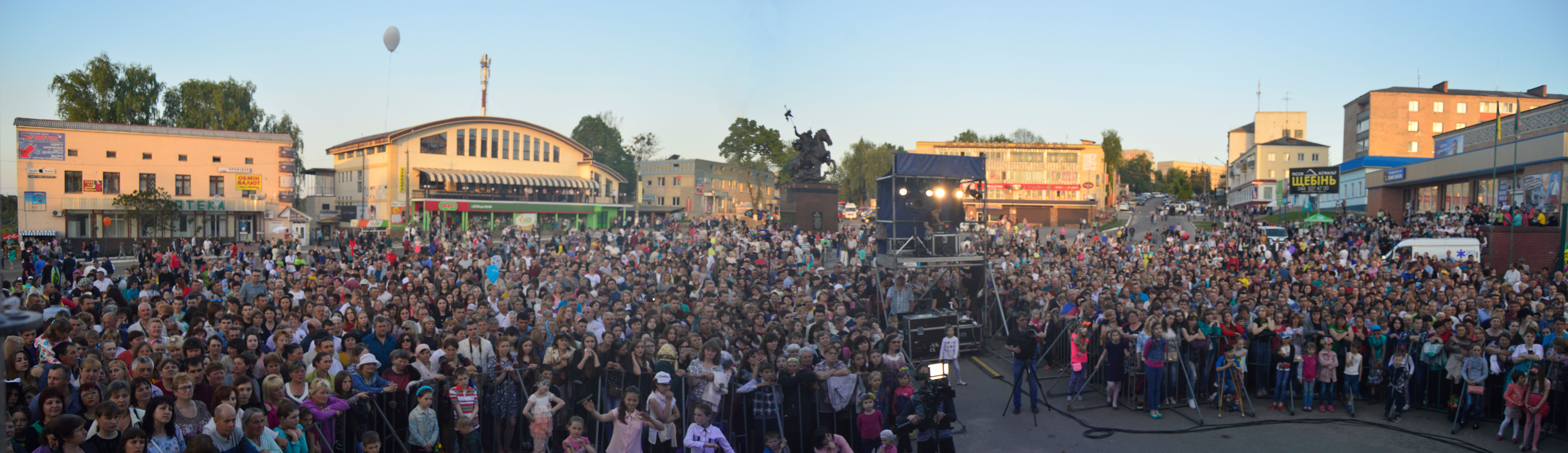
Celebration of City Day in 2017

=== Tetiiv City Day ===
Since 2016, City Day celebrations have been postponing to the first decade of May, when Tetiiv received self-government under Magdeburg Law, namely on May 4, 1606, at the request of Prince Janush Ostrozhskiy.

== Notable people ==
- Phil Spitalny (1890–1970), musician, H Leopold Spitalny (1887-1971) musician, NBC music director

== Gallery ==
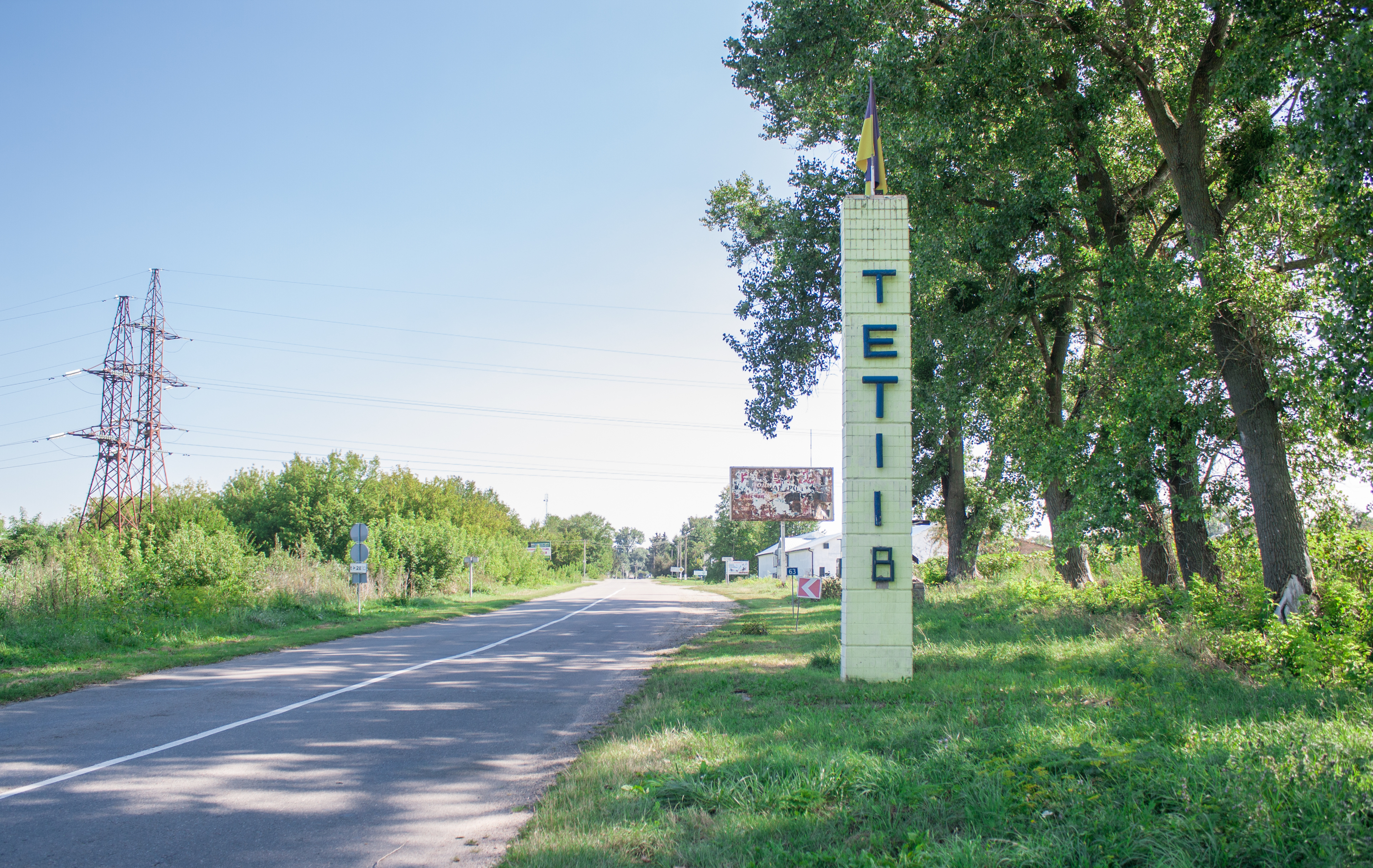
Place name sign

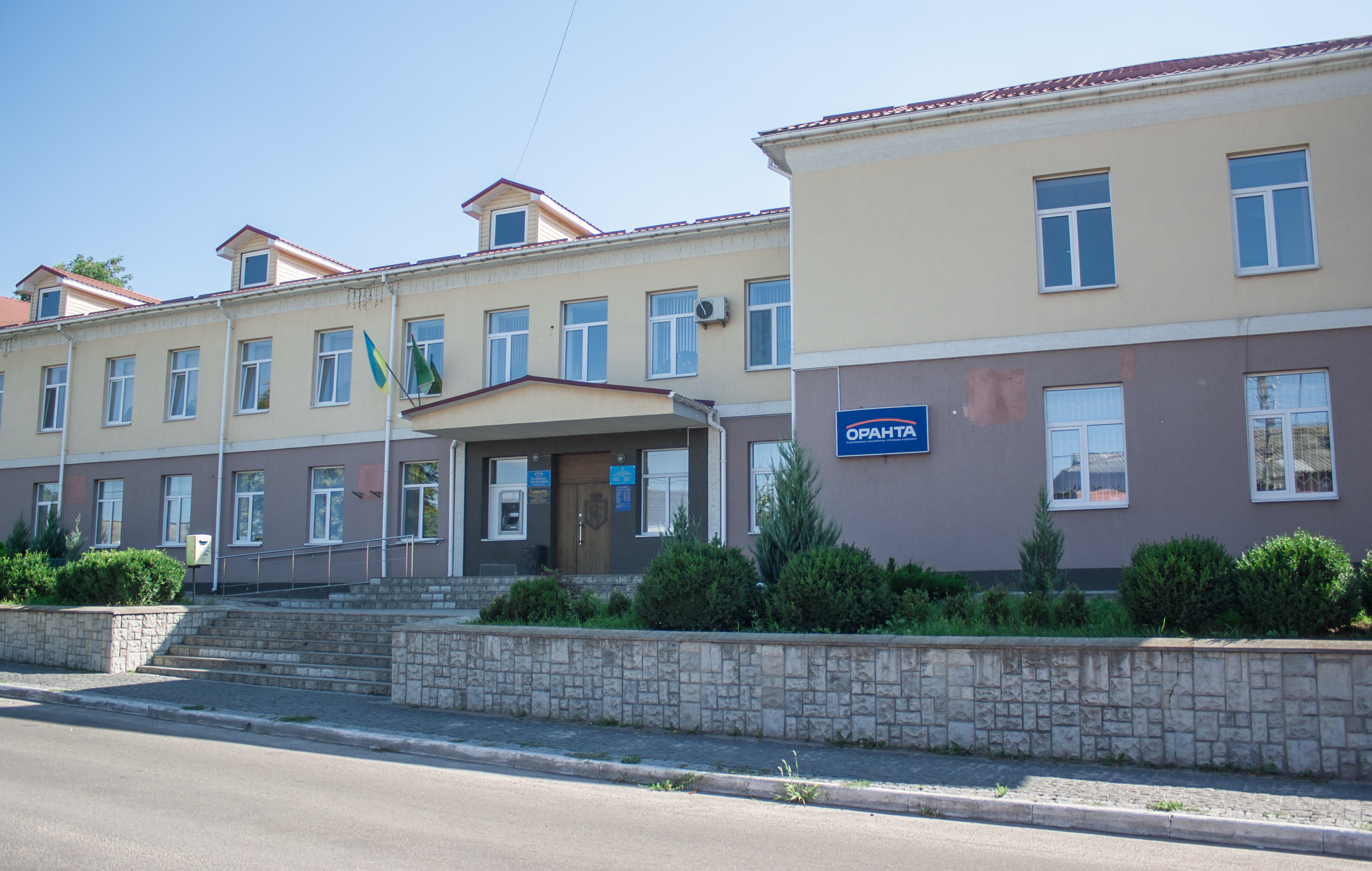
City Council

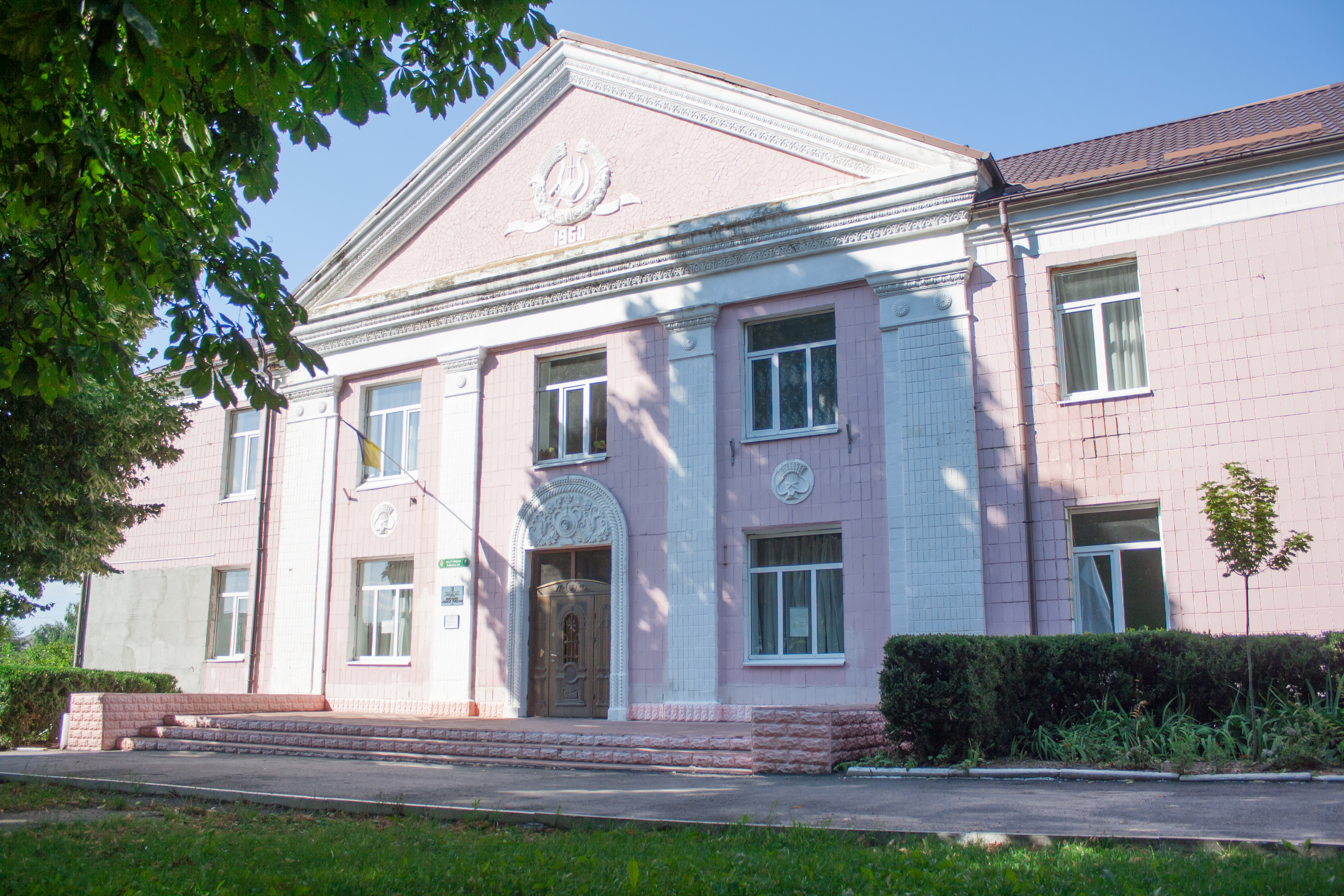
House of Culture

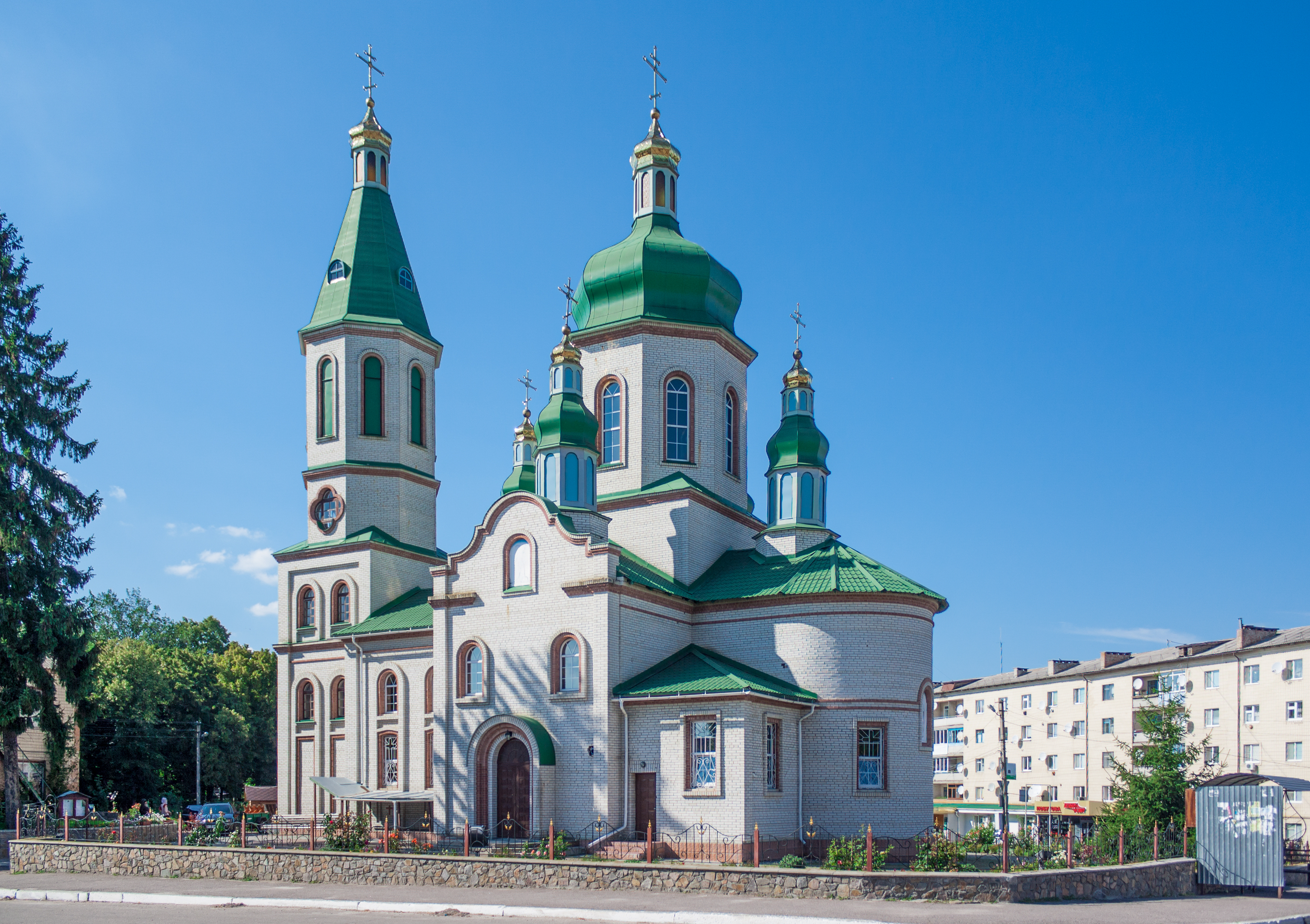
Church

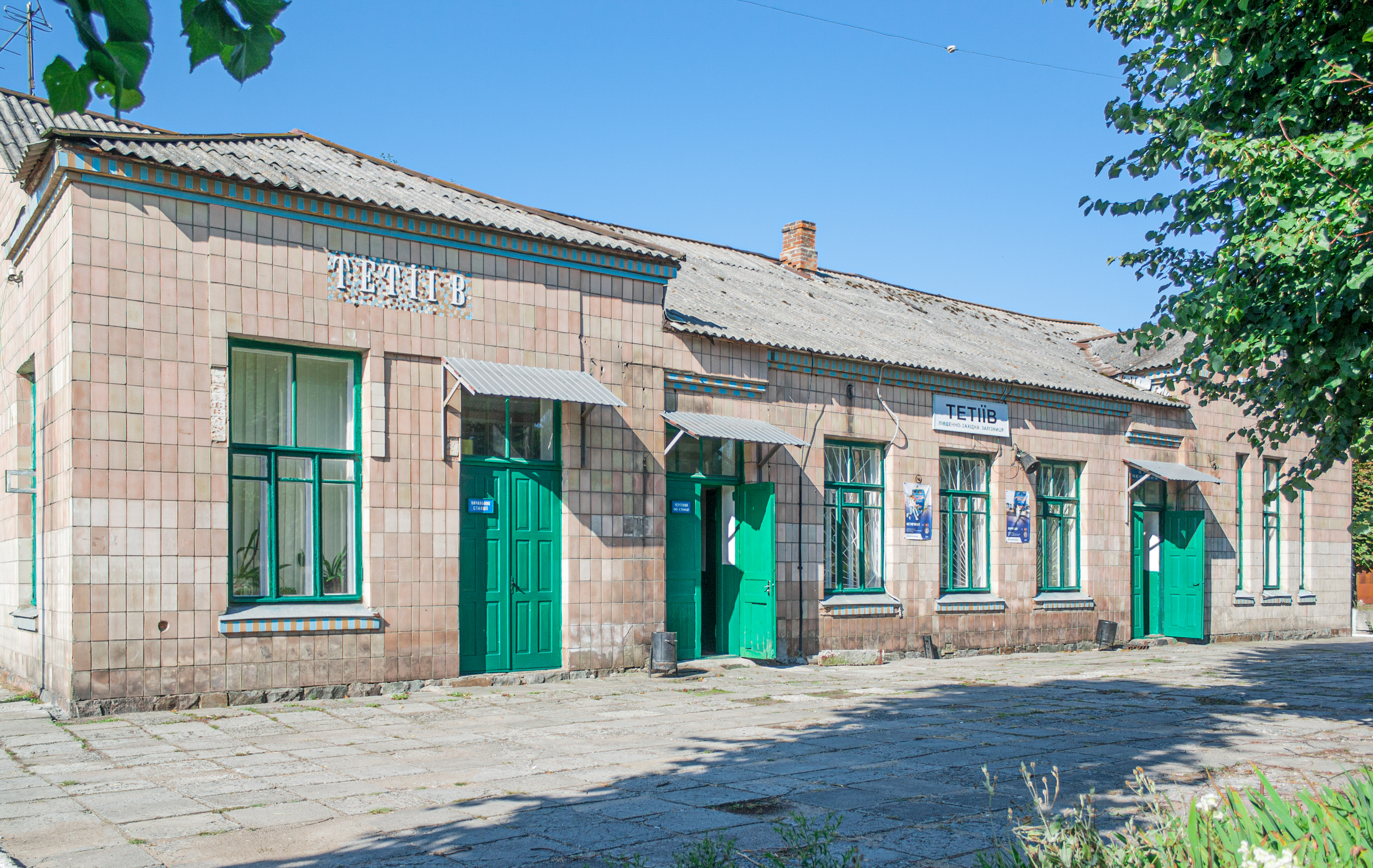
Railway station

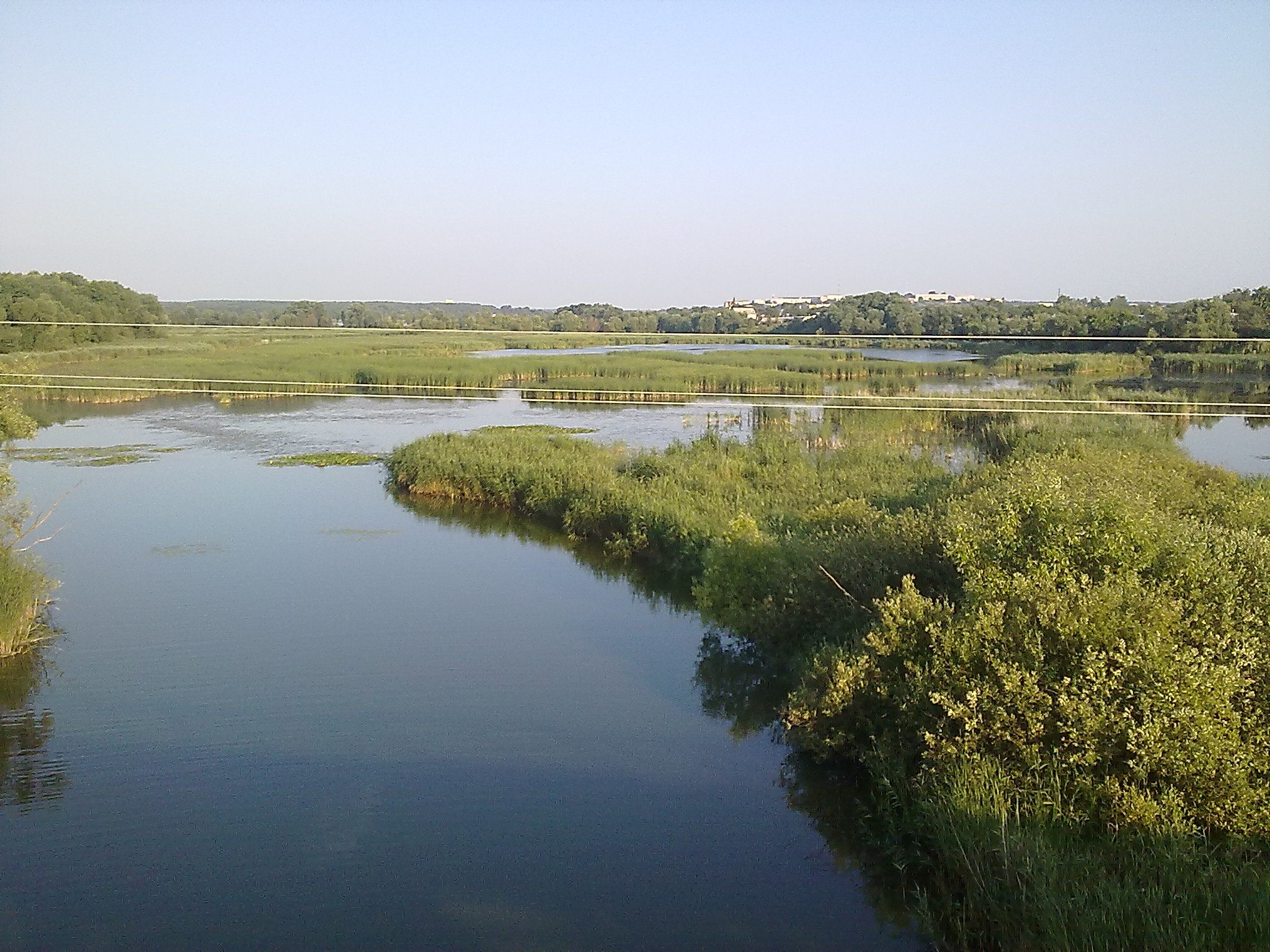
Nature reserve near Tetiiv
