= Kamianyi Brid, Zviahel Raion, Zhytomyr Oblast =

Rural locality in Zhytomyr Oblast, Ukraine

Kamianyi Brid Кам'яний Брід
- Rural settlement
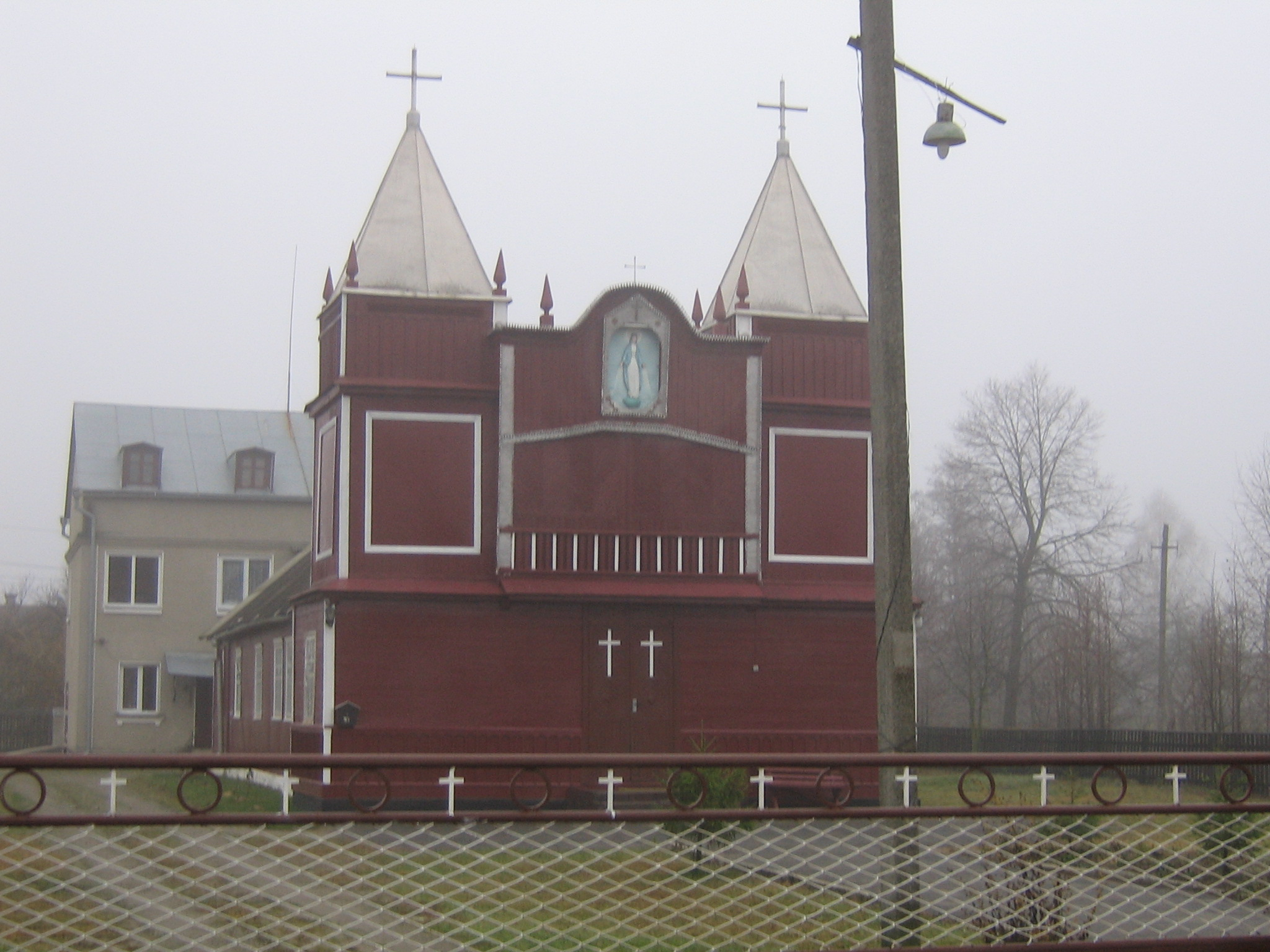
- Wooden Catholic church in Kamianyi Brid

- Location within Zhytomyr Oblast Location within Ukraine
- Coordinates: 50.4172°N 27.8381°E
- Country: Ukraine
- Oblast: Zhytomyr Oblast
- Raion: Zviahel Raion
- Time zone: UTC+2 (EET)
  - Summer (DST): UTC+3 (EEST)

Kamianyi Brid (Ukrainian: Кам'яний Брід) is a rural settlement in Zviahel Raion, Zhytomyr Oblast, Ukraine. Population: 2,355 (2022 estimate) In 2001, population was 2,670.

== History ==
Kamianyi Brid is located in the eastern part of the historical region of Volhynia. In Soviet times the settlement belonged to Baranivka Raion.

Until 26 January 2024, Kamianyi Brid was designated urban-type settlement. On this day, a new law entered into force which abolished this status, and Kamianyi Brid became a rural settlement.

=== Jewish population ===
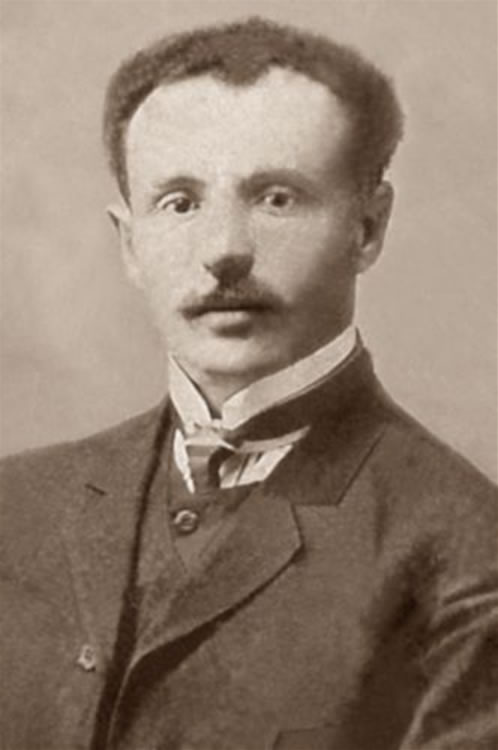
Chaim-Leyzer Perelmuter

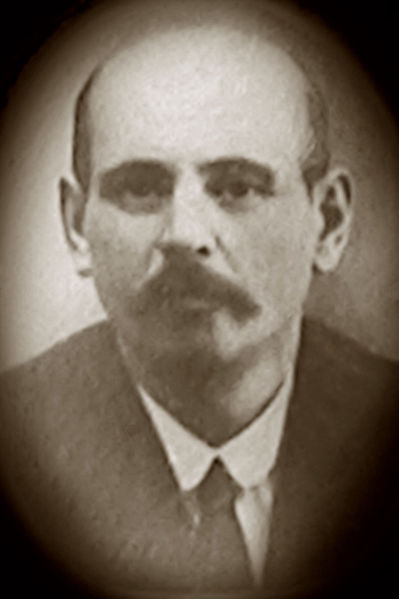
Nehemia Aronov Kiselgof-Naumov

The earliest known information on the Kamianyi Brid Jewish community dates from the 1850s. The Zusmans' faience factory operated here since 1862. Three synagogues operated here for decades (including one, at the factory's territory, which was closed, to be transferred to the local club, in 1928). Local Jews were adherents of the Chernobyl chassidism. Their last Rebbe (Tsadick, or leader) was Gersh-Leib (Zvi-Arie) Tverskiy Z”L, of Berdichev / Makarov (Chernobyl (Hasidic dynasty)). A.-F. Zusman, the owner of the Kamianyi Brid faience factory, also lived in Berdichev, not far from the Tsadik's residence. In 1919, there was a pogrom in Kamianyi Brid, which took lives of more than 200 Jewish men, including the local rabbi Shmuel Shvartzstein. The Jewish cemetery was founded here after pogrom as the burial place for its victims. Later this cemetery was used as the burial place for the Jews from the neighboring village of Dovbysch. The cemetery survived, however, the majority of gravestones have been destroyed, and inscriptions have become unreadable. The cemetery was divided into two parts: for males and for females. Until 1917, the local Bund's branch operated here. Nehemia Kiselgof, the head of a small local hospital, was one of outstanding personalities of this shtetl. He was the main organizer of working-class movement in the Kamianyi Brid. He was known in the workers' circle under a pseudonym “Naumov”. Also Haim-Lejzer Perelmuter son of Moishe-Bir Perelmiter, born in Baranivka, became a member of the Bund party and an active revolutionary (finally he became the chief of the first post-office of Kamianyi Brid). Presently, no Jews live in Kamianyi Brid, and the faience factory is not in operation. At the factory, the museum of Kamianyi Brid has been founded.

== Economy ==
A porcelain factory was active in the settlement.
