= Berestivka =

Berestivka (Ukrainian: Берестівка) may refer to several places in Ukraine:

- Berestivka, Rivne Oblast, village in Varash Raion
- Berestivka, Sumy Oblast, village in Romny Raion
- Berestivka, Vinnytsia Oblast, village in Vinnytsia Raion
- Berestivka, Zhytomyr Oblast, village in Zviahel Raion
