= 383rd Unmanned Aerial Vehicle Brigade =

383rd Separate Unmanned Aerial Vehicle Brigade 383rd Separate Remotely Controlled Aircraft Regiment (1992-2023)
- 383-тя окрема бригада безпілотних авіаційних комплексів
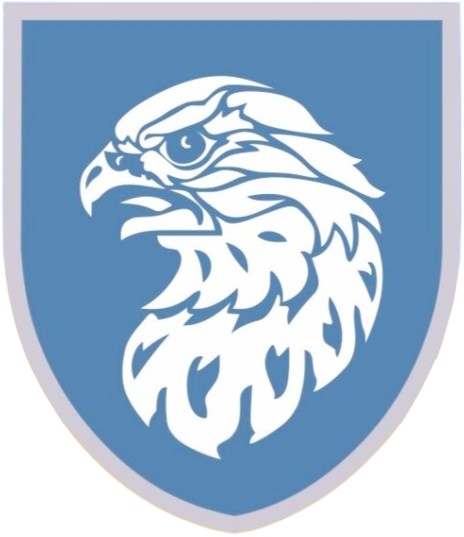
- Active: 1987-present
- Country: Ukraine; Soviet Union (1987–1991)
- Allegiance: Armed Forces of Ukraine
- Branch: Ukrainian Air Force
- Role: UAV operations
- Size: Brigade
- Part of: General Air Command
- Garrison/HQ: Khmelnytskyi, Khmelnytskyi Oblast
- Engagements: Russo-Ukrainian War: War in Donbas; Full scale invasion

Commanders
- Current commander: Andrii Dzyaniy

Insignia
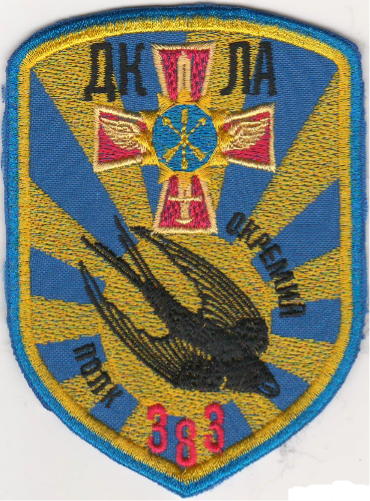
- Former Insignia

- Roundel

- Fin flash

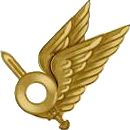
- Ukrainian Armed Forces branch insignia collar

Aircraft flown
- Attack: Bayraktar TB2
- Reconnaissance: Tu-141, Tu-143, TB2

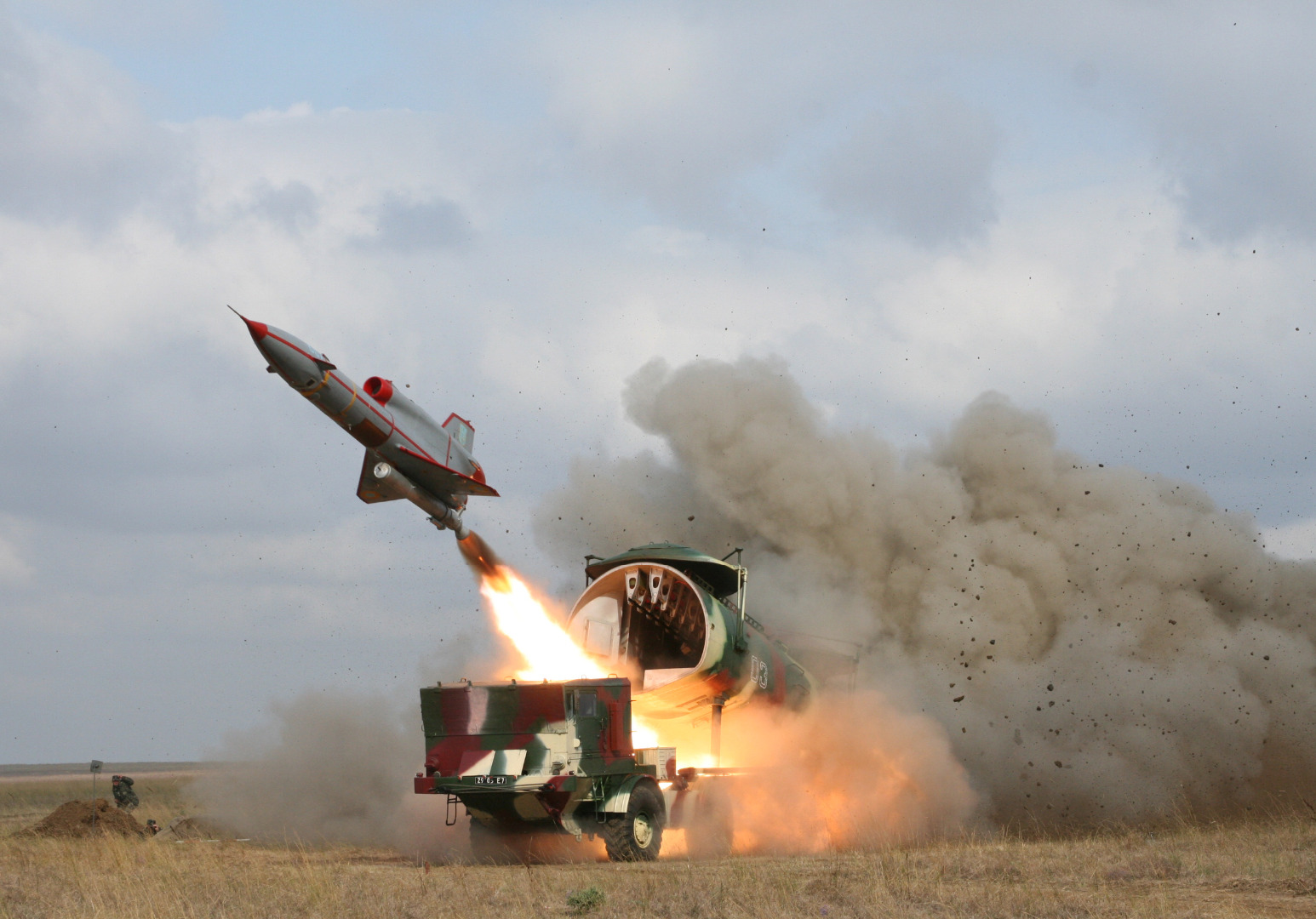
Launch of a Tu-143

The 383rd Separate Unmanned Aerial Vehicle Brigade (MUN А3808) is a unit of the Ukrainian Air Force operating Unmanned Aerial Vehicles.

It is the only unit of the Ukrainian Air Force operating Tupolev Tu-141, Tupolev Tu-143 and Bayraktar TB2 and is directly subordinated to the Air Force command. It was established during the Soviet era as a reconnaissance drone Regiment.

== History ==
The brigade is a specialized UAV Brigade and is the only brigade of the Ukrainian Air Force using Unmanned Aerial Vehicles such as Tu-141, Tu-143 and Bayraktar TB2.

In 1992, after the Dissolution of Soviet Union, the 383rd Unmanned Aerial Reconnaissance Vehicle Regiment of the Soviet Armed Forces and the Military unit 47040 came under jurisdiction of Ukraine and were merged to form 383rd Unmanned Aerial Vehicular Reconnaissance Regiment of the Ukrainian Air Force. On January 18, 1992, all personnel of the regiment swore the oath of loyalty to Ukraine, becoming one of the first units to do so. The regiment was armed with Tu-141 and Tu-143 UAVs.

Throughout its operational history it saw action in 3 exercises carrying out 78 launches of Tu-141 and 218 launches of Tu-143 reconnaissance aircraft at the sites of Shymkent, Mary, Baherove, Cape Chauda, and Kyiv-Olexandrivskyi, amongst others.

From 2014 to 2015, the regiment's Tu-141 UAVs performed reconnaissance operations against separatists in the ATO zone.

On April 5, 2014, the deployment of Tu-143 UAVs started with test flights being carried out on April 10, 2014. On August 1, 2014, the separatists claimed shooting down a Tu-143 in Shakhtarsk. However, it was reported to have been stolen from Ukrainian stockpiles. On November 19, 2014, the Tu-143 in reserve from the Soviet era were revamped.

On February 3, 2015, a Tu-143 was shot down by separatists near Irmino in Luhansk Oblast. On February 10, 2015, during the February 2015 Kramatorsk rocket attack, two personnel of the regiment (Hlubokov Volodymyr Petrovych and Shmeretsky Serhiy Vasyliovych) were killed in action.

On 25 April 2017, a soldier of the regiment (Melnyk Ivan Oleksandrovich) was killed in the Battle of Horlivka while working in conjunction with the 95th Air Assault Brigade. On 1 June 2017, the military unit celebrated its 30th anniversary and a memorial for fallen personnel of the regiment was opened.

In 2018, the regiment was officially recognized as the best military intelligence and reconnaissance unit of the Ukrainian Air Force.

On March 20, 2019, the regiment received the first operational tactical strike drones, the Bayraktar TB2. It is the first unit of the Ukrainian Armed Forces and the only regiment of the Ukrainian Air Force to obtain them.

On October 26, 2021, a Bayraktar TB2 attacked Russian mercenaries and damaged a howitzer which had shelled Ukrainian positions. The Bayraktar TB2 started reconnaissance patrols throughout Ukraine starting from Spring 2021 and took part in Zapad 2021 exercises in April 2021. On 9 April 2021, Bayraktar TB2 carried out reconnaissance in separatist held territory in addition to flying over Kherson, Zaporizhzhia, Dnipro and Kharkiv. On September 28, 2021, a Bayraktar TB2 flew over Volnovakha and Kurakhove. On October 26, 2021, a Bayraktar TB2 destroyed a separatist artillery unit in Hranitne. In November 2021, a Bayraktar TB2 destroyed a Russian cannon violating ceasefire agreement forcing the separatists to stop shelling. The location of the strike was geolocated to be 13 km from the front line, south of Boikivske.

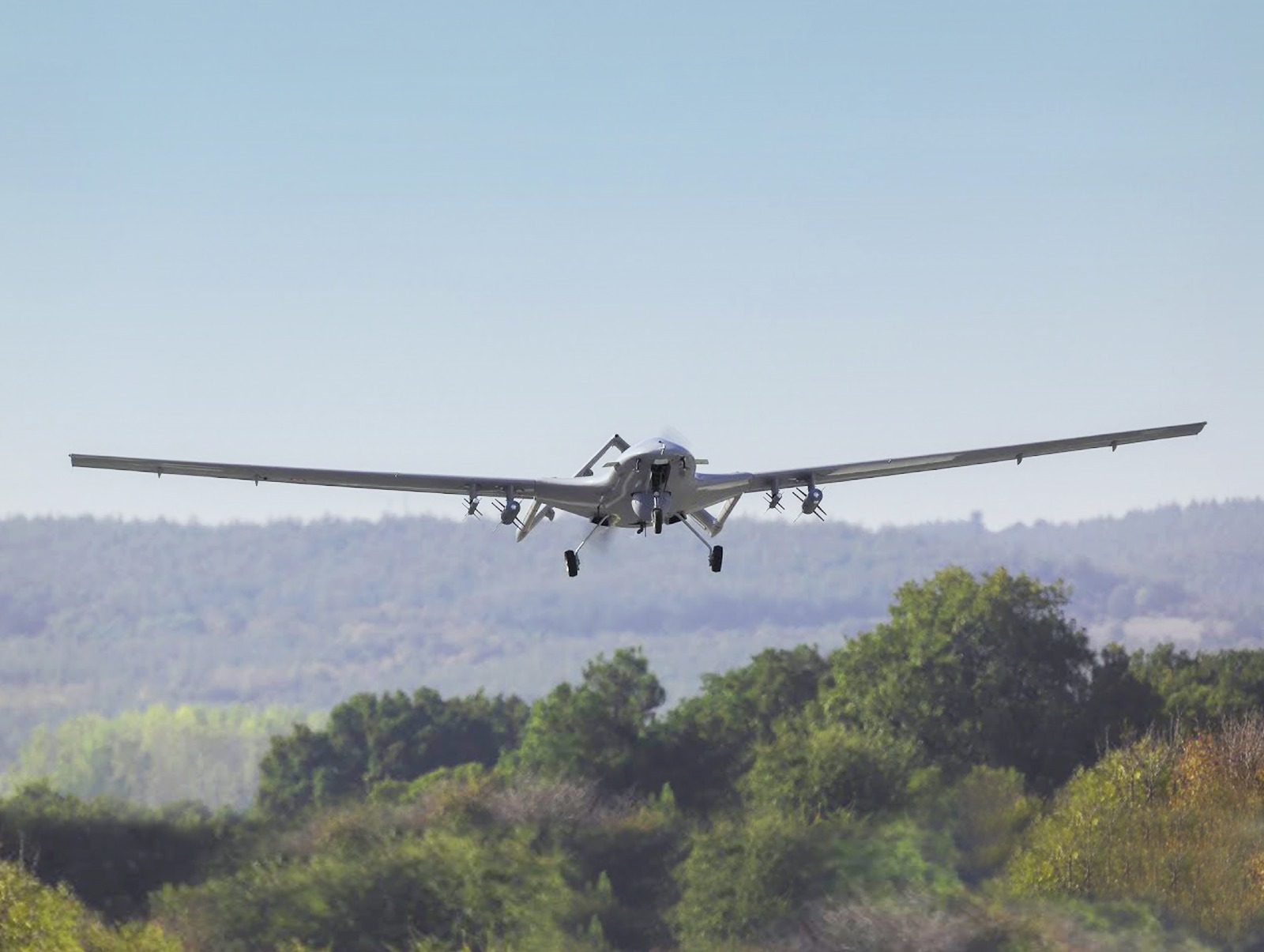
Ukrainian TB2 Bayraktar

On 24 February 2022, the day of the start of the full scale Russian invasion of Ukraine, four Bayraktar TB2 drones stationed at Chuhuiv Air base were abandoned and later destroyed on the ground by Ukrainian Forces. The People's Militia of the Luhansk People's Republic meanwhile claimed it shot down two TB2 drones near the city of Luhansk. On 26 February 2022, two TB2 drones were claimed shot down near Shchastia. On February 28, 2022, the regiment carried out 2 strikes on Russian targets using Bayraktar TB2 UAVs destroying a column of Russian equipment in the Kherson Oblast and a Buk air defense system near Malyn. On 2 March 2022, with the help of Bayraktar UAVs, the regiment destroyed Russian equipment in Sumy Oblast, including a Pantsir which was later studied by Ukrainian Armed Forces. On 8 March 2022, a Tu-141 reconnaissance drone was reported to have crashed in Ukraine. On March 12, a Bayraktar Uragan rocket system and also destroyed one of the headquarters of the Russian 35th Army, several electronic warfare and lower-level headquarters. On 17 March 2022, a Bayraktar TB2 was shot down over Kyiv; Russia published images of the drone wreckage. A second TB2 drone was shot down on 29 March 2022, in eastern Ukraine. On 2 April a third TB-2 drone was shot down. On 26 and 27 April, three additional TB2 drones were destroyed, two in Kursk Oblast and the third in Belgorod Oblast, Russia, by a Pantsir-S1. On 1 May, a TB2 drone with registration S51T was shot down in Kursk region, Russia. TB2 losses amounted to seven units confirmed visually. On 7 May, a TB2 drone attacked and destroyed a Russian Mil Mi-8 transport helicopter as it was unloading passengers on Snake Island. In the same deployment, a TB2 drone destroyed a Tor missile launcher on the island, while a second launcher was destroyed as it was being unloaded from a landing craft. This cleared the way for a bombing run by a Ukrainian Air Force Sukhoi Su-27 'Flanker' aircraft against buildings on the island. On 23 May 2022, the remains of a Ukrainian Bayraktar TB2, tail number 75, were found in Romanian territorial waters by Romanian authorities. The drone was likely shot down during the Snake Island attacks of 7 May. At the end of July 2022, Russian military released video of the destruction of a TB2 using a Lancet munition. On 3 July 2022, the governor of the Kursk region wrote on Telegram that "our air defenses shot down two Ukrainian Tu-141 drones". As of 12 September 2022, at least 95 units of Russian equipment were confirmed to have been destroyed using the Bayraktar TB2s. (Note: Including limited number of naval equipment (at least 2 vessels) destroyed by Ukrainian Navy UAVs) On 5 December 2022, explosions were reported at two Russian airbases: the one at Engels-2 reportedly damaged two Tu-95s; the other at the Dyagilevo military airbase near Ryazan, destroyed a fuel truck, damaged a Tu-22M3 and killed three, injuring five. The attacks were carried out by Tu-141. On 26 December 2022, at midnight, explosions were again reported at Engels-2. Air sirens were reported being heard at the base and surrounding areas. The local governor Roman Busargin reported no damage to "civilian infrastructure". Three people from the "technical staff" were reported to be killed. According to Russian media, the attack was foiled, but Ukrainian and Russian social media accounts reported a number of bombers to have been destroyed. A modified Tu-141 was used to undertake the attack.

On February 6, 2023, a modified Tu-141 of the regiment fell near the city of Kaluga, deep inside Russian territory after allegedly being stuck in tree branches. On 26 March 2023, Russia stated that it had downed a Tu-141 near Kireyevsk using a Polye-21 jamming system, resulting in three casualties and damage to an apartment block. On May 4, 2023, during a planned flight over Kyiv, a TB2 was hijacked and then destroyed by Ukrainian Forces to prevent capture. In August 2023, the 383rd Regiment had become the 383rd UAV brigade. On August 5, the 34th Separate Squadron of the brigade was assigned the name of Colonel Ruslan Tyukh. On August 22, 2023, it officially received a new regimental insignia from the Air Force command, showing the silver head of a Kestrel. On 3 October 2023, the brigade's commander Serhii Burdeniuk was charged by a Russian court in absentia for involvement in attacks on Russian and Crimean soil blamed on Ukraine.

Following the creation of the Unmanned Systems Forces, the Brigade was put under command of the new branch, in order to ensure the co-ordination of doctrine and of targeting; however, operational control remains with the Air Force.

== Structure ==
- 383rd Unmanned Aerial Vehicle Brigade
- Brigade's Headquarters
  - A1850
  - 34th Separate Unmanned Aviation Squadron ''Colonel Ruslan Tyukh''
  - 36th Separate Unmanned Aviation Squadron
  - 37th Separate Unmanned Aviation Squadron Princess Olga

== Commanders ==
- Oleg Lutsenko (2008-?)
- Vitaly Mykhailovych Voitsikh (?-?)
- Serhiy Burdenyuk (2019–2021)
- Dzyaniy Andrii Anatoliyovych (2021-)
