= Kamianyi Brid =

Kamianyi Brid may refer

- Kamianyi Brid, Baranivka Raion, a town in Zhytomyr Oblast
- Kamianyi Brid, Luhansk, a former village, now part of the city Luhansk
