= 2022 Zagreb Tu-141 drone crash =

Military drone crash in Zagreb, Croatia

Zagreb Tu-141 drone crash
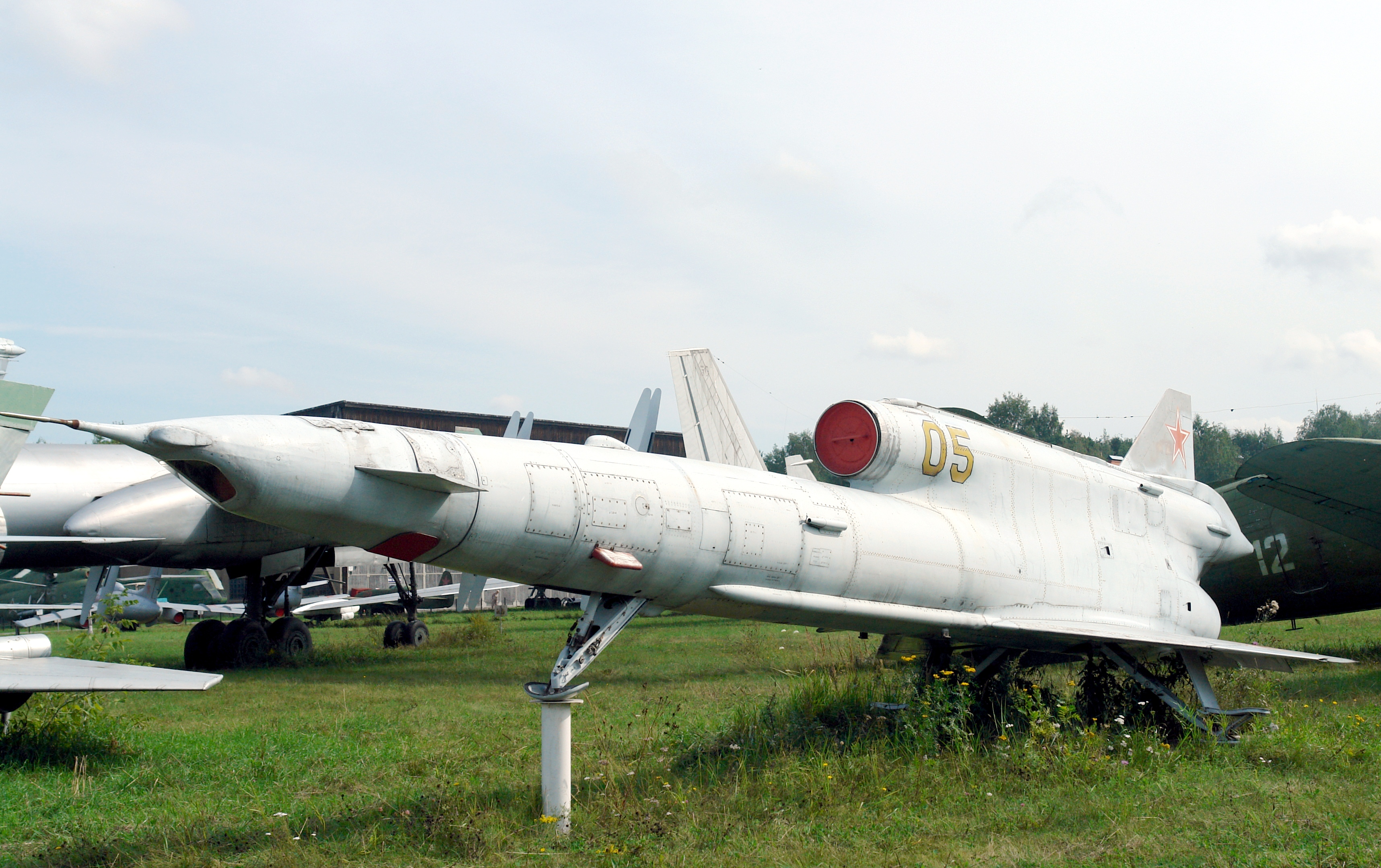
- Tu-141 Strizh at Central Air Force Museum, Monino, Russia, similar to one that crashed in Zagreb

Accident
- Date: 10 March 2022
- Summary: Flew over Hungary and Romania before running out of fuel; crashed near a major student dormitory in Zagreb, Croatia
- Site: Zagreb, Croatia; 45°47′4″N 15°57′0″E

Aircraft
- Aircraft type: Tupolev Tu-141
- Operator: Undisclosed; Proclaimed state secret by Croatian, Hungarian and Romanian governments.
- Flight origin: Somewhere in Ukraine (suspected)
- Destination: Unknown
- Occupants: 0

On 10 March 2022 at 23:01 CET, an unidentified Soviet-made Tupolev Tu-141 reconnaissance unmanned aerial vehicle (UAV) crashed in Zagreb, the capital of Croatia. With an unidentified operator and unknown destination, the origin of the drone was presumed to be connected to military actions during the Russian invasion of Ukraine. The drone's flight over Croatia, Hungary and Romania (all three being NATO states) prompted criticism of the countries' defense systems as the UAV was detected but not cleared. In response, the Croatian government restricted airspace over major cities and received military support from France and the United States who dispatched multiple fighter-jets to Croatia days later for joint exercises.

== Background ==
The Tupolev Tu-141 "Strizh" is a Soviet-era unmanned aerial vehicle (UAV) developed in the late 1970s. Weighing nearly six tons, it is launched from a truck-mounted platform with a pre-programmed flight path. Upon mission completion, the drone deploys parachutes for recovery and reuse. Its operational range is approximately 1,000 km (620 mi).

During the 2022 Russian invasion of Ukraine, the Tu-141 was repurposed by Ukrainian forces for long-range reconnaissance and strike missions. Notably, in December 2022, modified Tu-141 drones were reportedly used in attacks on Russian airbases at Dyagilevo and Engels-2 air base, causing casualties and damaging aircraft.

At the time of the Zagreb crash, Ukraine was experiencing intense Russian missile and drone attacks, including strikes on Kyiv that resulted in civilian casualties.

== Flight and crash ==
The unmanned aerial vehicle entered Romanian airspace around 23:23 EET, where it was observed by the Romanian Air Force and flew for 3 minutes. Afterwards, it continued flying through Hungarian airspace for the next 40 minutes at about 1,000 metres (3,300 ft) altitude, where it was also observed by the Hungarian Air Force. It then entered Croatian airspace flying at a speed of 700 km/h (380 kn; 430 mph) and altitude of 1,300 metres (4,300 ft), where it was picked up by Croatian military radar. After spending seven minutes in Croatian airspace, it crashed in the Jarun neighborhood of the capital, some 50 m (160 ft) away from the Stjepan Radić Student Residence Hall of Zagreb University. The impact damaged 96 cars parked nearby and awoke a student dormitory.

The Seismological Service of Croatia recorded seismic waves at the time of the UAV's impact with an epicenter very close to the actual crash site.

== Investigation ==
Croatian civil and military police quickly sealed off the crash perimeter. The next morning, American analyst Tyler Rogoway identified the aircraft to most likely be a Soviet era Tupolev Tu-141, which was corroborated by Cyrillic inscriptions and red star insignia found on the scattered debris near the crash site. There were also several parachutes hanging on the nearby trees. Throughout 12 March, Croatian Army continued the excavation of a remaining major part of the debris, which was wedged into the ground. The debris was taken to a secret location. On the same day, the head of the military police of Croatian Army Chief of Staff brigadier Vlado Kovačević said that the aircraft's black box was recovered and that some fragments point to the possibility that the aircraft was also carrying an explosive device.

In an interview on 13 March, the Croatian Minister of Defence Mario Banožić confirmed that parts belonging to an explosive device were found in the debris of the drone. He also added that the weight of the explosive could have been up to 120 kg.

Prime Minister of Croatia Andrej Plenković remarked to the media on 17 March that the UAV flew to Croatia because Romanian and Hungarian radars did not identify the incoming object as a real threat, due to the fact that there were several false alarms in the days before the incident and it was thought that it was a glitch. Given the fact that neither Romanian or Hungarian radars reported the object, NATO in turn could not order the interception of the UAV.

On 23 March, Minister of the Interior Davor Božinović confirmed that the UAV carried an aerial bomb.

The investigation report was presented on 13 April. A detailed analysis of its metal fragments showed that the drone carried an OFAB-100-120 aerial bomb and had hit the ground because of parachute failure. However, no traces of military explosives, such as Trinitrotoluene (TNT), were found on it. The bomb was charged by unconventional organic powder. On 30 November 2022, while answering questions in parliament, defense minister Banožić revealed that NATO member states whose territories were overflown by the drone had proclaimed the drone operator a state secret.

== Reactions ==
=== Domestic ===
The slow or non-existent reaction from air defence services caused outrage among the Croatian media and public, with some comparing the incident to Mathias Rust's flight to the Red Square in 1987.

President of Croatia Zoran Milanović described the crash as "a serious incident" and added that "in such situations you depend on NATO [...] while there was obviously some failure there". The President said Croatia knew where the drone flew from, "evidently Ukraine to Zagreb".

Prime Minister Plenković said on 12 March that "[t]his is a real threat. NATO and the EU were supposed to react. We will not tolerate such [a] situation [...] we were very lucky. This could have fallen on a nuclear power plant in Hungary." He also announced that he had written a letter to the Secretary General of NATO Jens Stoltenberg regarding the situation.

The Mayor of Zagreb, Tomislav Tomašević, held a press conference regarding the incident and commented that "no people were hurt during the impact, but there is some property damage". On 12 March 2022, Tomašević criticized certain unnamed foreign media sources for allegedly misrepresenting the location of the crash site. He stated: "I must admit that I am quite bothered by the information in foreign media sources, where I have read that such a large military aircraft had crashed in the suburbs of Zagreb, or that it had crashed next to Zagreb. No, it did not crash next to Zagreb, it crashed in the centre of Zagreb, in a densely populated area, and it did not crash in any type of suburban area."

The Croatian online newspaper Index.hr suggested the drone may have been meant to fly to a location in Ukraine called Yarun' rather than the Zagreb neighborhood of Jarun, which sounds similar.

Distinguished Croatian Air Force pilot Ivan Selak criticized NATO's Combined Air Operations Centre in Torrejón, Spain, for not scrambling Romanian, Hungarian or Croatian Air Force jets to intercept the aircraft.

On 12 March, the Croatian daily newspaper Jutarnji list wrote that Croatia might ask the United States to deploy their Patriot missile systems in the country. Croatian military expert and former defence minister deputy Nikola Brzica commented, "Armed Forces of Croatia have at least two systems in their inventory, which could have brought down such a simple target, yet they weren't used. [...] It turns out that neither us [Croatians], nor Hungarians, nor Romanians properly tracked that target, nor contacted others and this is a big problem for NATO's air defence".

=== Foreign ===
Ukrainian Defence Minister's adviser Markiyan Lubkivsky, in a statement to Croatian media, denied that the UAV which crashed in Zagreb belongs to Ukraine. In subsequent reaction to the writing of Russian news agency TASS, State Special Communications Service of Ukraine also further claimed that the UAVs in question are in possession of both Russian and Ukrainian Armed Forces. However, according to Ukrainian officials, the Ukrainian variants of Tu-141 UAVs are marked by the Ukrainian coat of arms while Russian variants have the red star insignia.

The Russian Embassy in Zagreb also denied ownership of the crashed drone, stating that "the drone was produced on the territory of Ukraine" and that Russian Armed Forces had not used such drones since 1991.

Hungarian Minister of Foreign Affairs and Trade Péter Szijjártó announced that the Hungarian government had joined the investigation into the UAV.

The Secretary General of NATO Jens Stoltenberg claimed that the drone that crashed in Croatia was unarmed and the crash did not constitute an armed attack.

== Aftermath ==
A joint exercise between the Croatian Air Force and French pilots from the aircraft carrier Charles de Gaulle was held on 15 March 2022. The exercise was conducted in the airspace over the regions of Istria, Kvarner, Lika, and Kordun, as well as over the cities of Rijeka, Pula, Zadar, and Zagreb. Later that day, Croatian president and commander-in-chief Zoran Milanović published a statement announcing that he had given an order to the Chief of the General Staff Admiral Robert Hranj whereby overflights of military aircraft over Zagreb and the country's other cities would be "strictly forbidden". On 16 March 2022, the United States dispatched two F-16 fighter jets from Italy to a Croatian airbase in Pleso.

On 17 March 2022, Ukrainian Minister of Defence Oleksii Reznikov continued to insist that Ukrainians were "not the ones who launched that drone towards Croatia"; he also expressed incomprehension of NATO's apparent failure to prevent the incident, saying: "The drone flew over several member states. How come you didn't see it? Why didn't you destroy it? Can you cover your own airspace?".

As a result of the drone crash, the Croatian government decided to urgently acquire surface-to-air missile (SAM) systems. According to Croatian media reports, French-made Mistral and VL MICA Systems were acquired by the country.

== Related incidents ==
=== Hungary ===
The Hungarian Air Force first detected and tracked the aircraft after it had passed through Romanian airspace late in the evening of March 10. The next day, the Air Force further detected another suspicious radar signal around noon. Hungarian Gripen fighters took off from Kecskemét air base but found no suspicious flying object. Another incident occurred during the afternoon later that day prompting fighters to be scrambled but they likewise did not find any suspicious flying objects.

=== Romania ===
On 13 March, just three days after the event in Zagreb, a drone crashed in the Tărpiu village close to the Transylvanian city of Bistrița in Romania. Unlike the UAV that crashed in Croatia, this one carried no armament. It was identified as a Russian Orlan-10 reconnaissance drone. Like Croatia, Romania is also a NATO member and as such is under its security umbrella.

== See also ==
- List of accidents and incidents involving military aircraft (2020–present)
- Violations of non-combatant airspaces during the Russian invasion of Ukraine
- List of UAV-related incidents
- 2022 missile explosion in Poland
- 1989 Belgium MiG-23 crash
