= Baranivka Raion =

Former subdivision of Zhytomyr Oblast, Ukraine

Baranivka Raion Баранівський район
- Raion
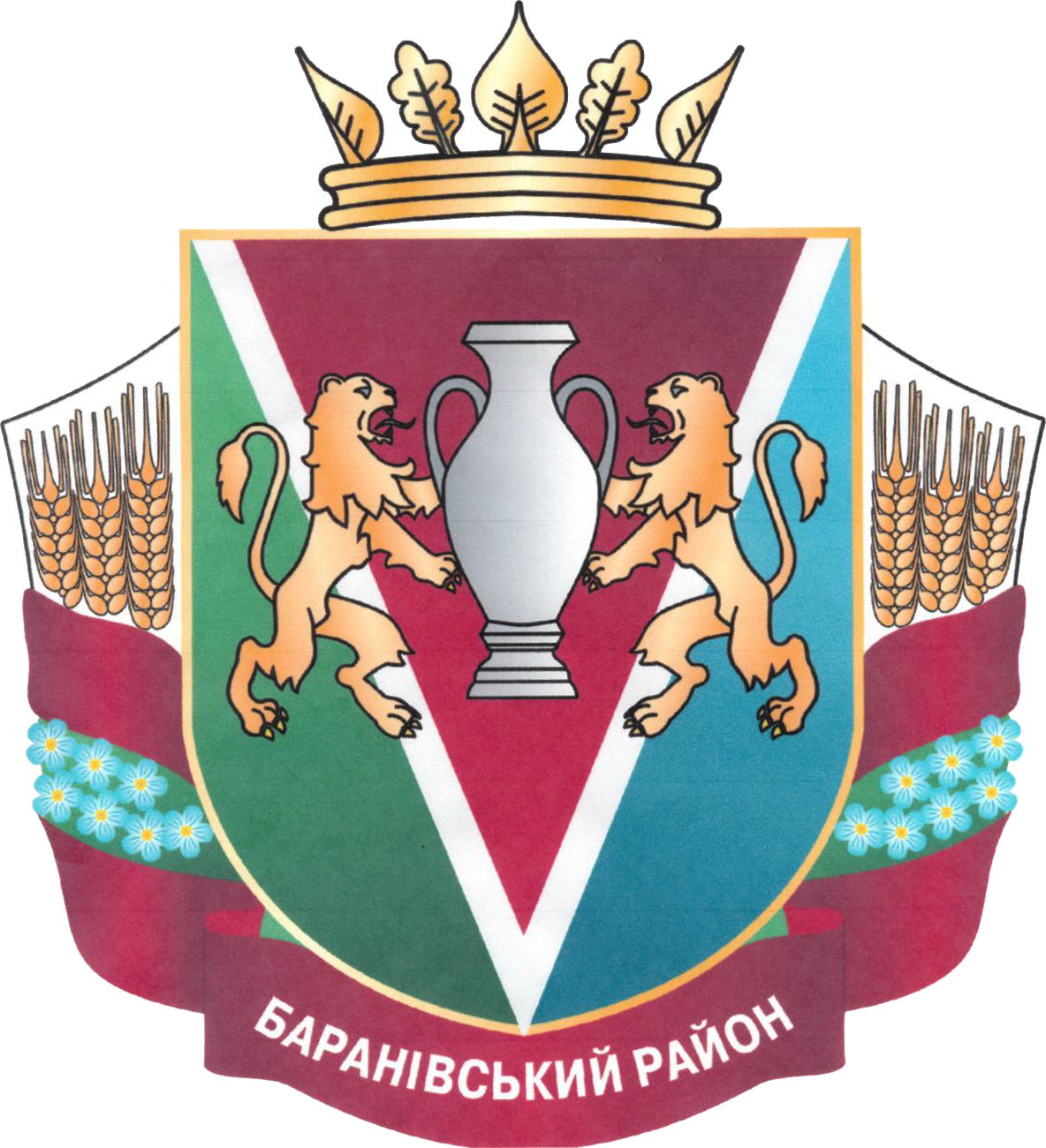
- Flag Coat of arms

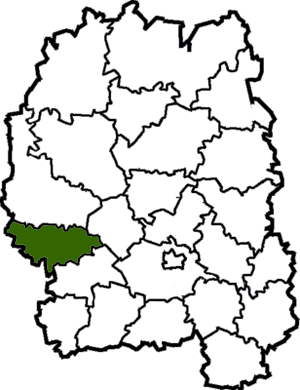
- Coordinates: 50°18′14″N 27°44′45″E
- Country: Ukraine
- Oblast: Zhytomyr Oblast
- Disestablished: 19 July 2020
- Admin. center: Baranivka
- Subdivisions: List: 1 — city councils; 5 — settlement councils; — rural councils; Number of localities: 1 — cities; 5 — urban-type settlements; — villages; — rural settlements

Area
  - Total: 1,000 km^{2} (390 sq mi)

Population (2020)
  - Total: 38,510 ▼
  - Density: 39/km^{2} (100/sq mi)
- Time zone: UTC+02:00 (EET)
  - Summer (DST): UTC+03:00 (EEST)
- Area code: +380

Baranivka Raion (Ukrainian: Баранівський район) was a raion (district) of Zhytomyr Oblast, northern Ukraine. Its administrative centre was located at the town of Baranivka. The raion covered an area of 1,000 square kilometres (390 mi^{2}). The raion was abolished on 19 July 2020 as part of the administrative reform of Ukraine, which reduced the number of raions of Zhytomyr Oblast to four. The area of Baranivka Raion was merged into Novohrad-Volynskyi Raion. The last estimate of the raion population was 38,510 (2020 est.)
