= Veresna =

Coordinates: 50°22′56″N 27°18′27″E

Veresna (Ukrainian: Вересна, formerly spelled as Вересня, Veresnia) is a village in Ukraine located in Zviahel Raion, Zhytomyr Oblast.

Its KOATUU code is 1820684202. Its population is 172 people as 2001. Its postal index is 12710. Its calling code is 4144.

On 21 September 2009, the village name was corrected from Veresnia to Veresna.

== Address of the village council ==
12734, Ukraine, Zhytomyr Oblast, Zviahel Raion, village Veresna.
