= Baranivka, Zhytomyr Oblast =

City in Zhytomyr Oblast, Ukraine

Baranivka Баранівка Baranówka
- City
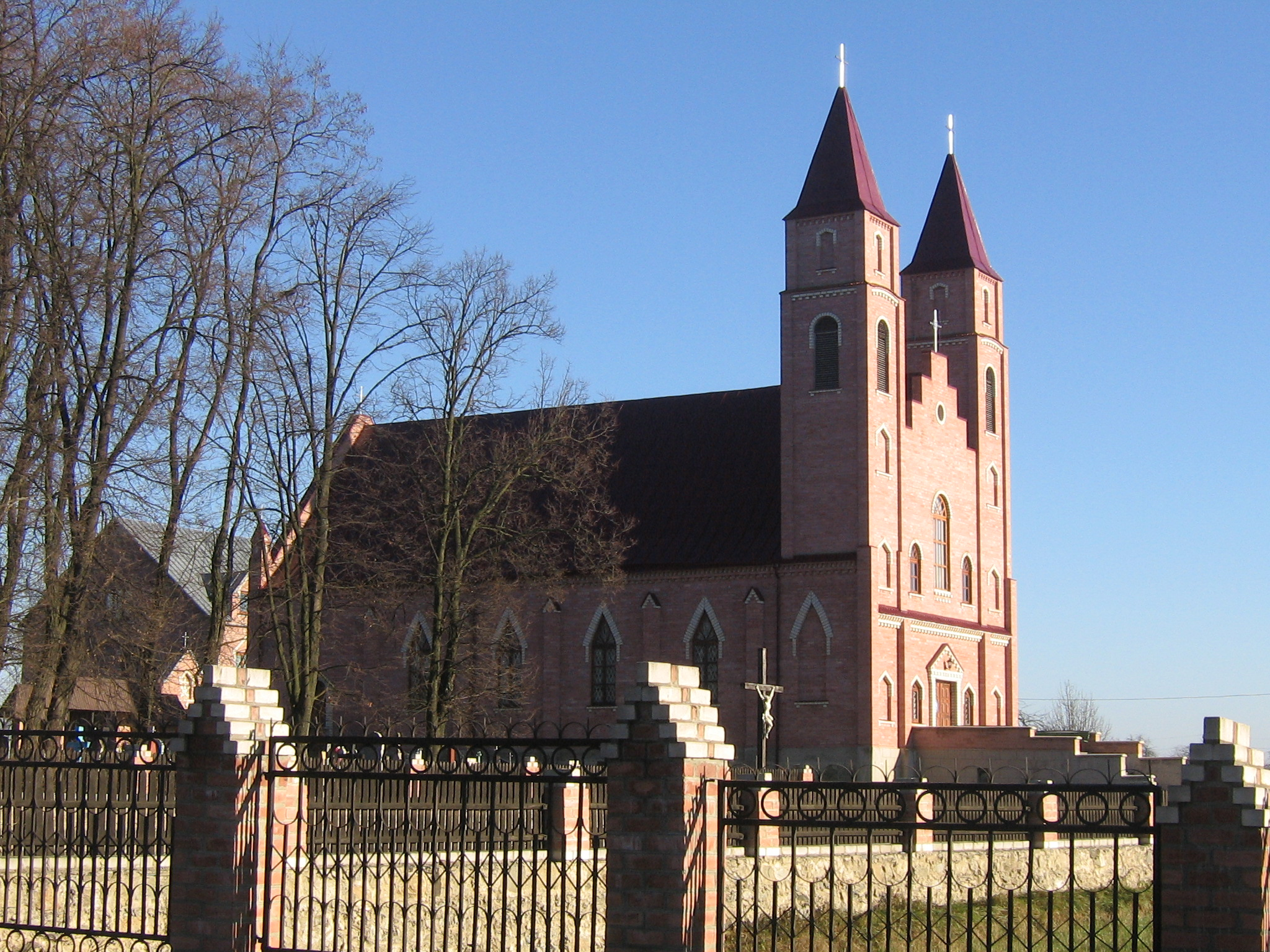
- Saint Stanislaus Church

- Flag Coat of arms

- Location of Baranivka in Zhytomyr Oblast Location of Baranivka in Ukraine
- Coordinates: 50°18′N 27°40′E
- Country: Ukraine
- Oblast: Zhytomyr Oblast
- Raion: Zviahel Raion
- Hromada: Baranivka urban hromada

Area
  - Total: 22.34 km^{2} (8.63 sq mi)

Population (2022)
  - Total: 11,161
  - Density: 499.6/km^{2} (1,294/sq mi)
- Time zone: UTC+2 (EET)
  - Summer (DST): UTC+3 (EEST)

Baranivka (Ukrainian: Баранівка, IPA: [bɐˈrɑn⁽ʲ⁾iu̯kɐ]; Russian: Барановка; Polish: Baranówka; Yiddish: באראניווקע, romanized: Baranivke) is a city in Zviahel Raion in the Zhytomyr Oblast of Ukraine. Prior to the 2020 administrative reform, it was the administrative centre of the former Baranivka Raion. Population: 11,161 (2022 estimate). In 2001 the population was 12,584.

== Name ==
The name either comes from the old Slavic language, where *bara means swamp, or from Old East Slavic, where baran means ram. The first meaning of the word is given not coincidental, as the town is located in close proximity to the Prypiat Marshes.

In Zhytomyr Oblast, between Zviahel and Korosten, there is another small town of Barashi, about 50 km northeast from Baranivka.

== Geography ==
Baranivka is located on the Sluch river in the eastern part of Volhynia.

== History ==
The city has been historically known as a center of porcelain production. In summer of 1919 Baranivka was the site of a battle fought by the 1st and 3rd regiments of Sich Riflemen against the Bolsheviks. In 1933 its population reached 5,500 inhabitants.

== Notable people ==
- Artem Smolyakov, Ukrainian footballer

== Gallery ==
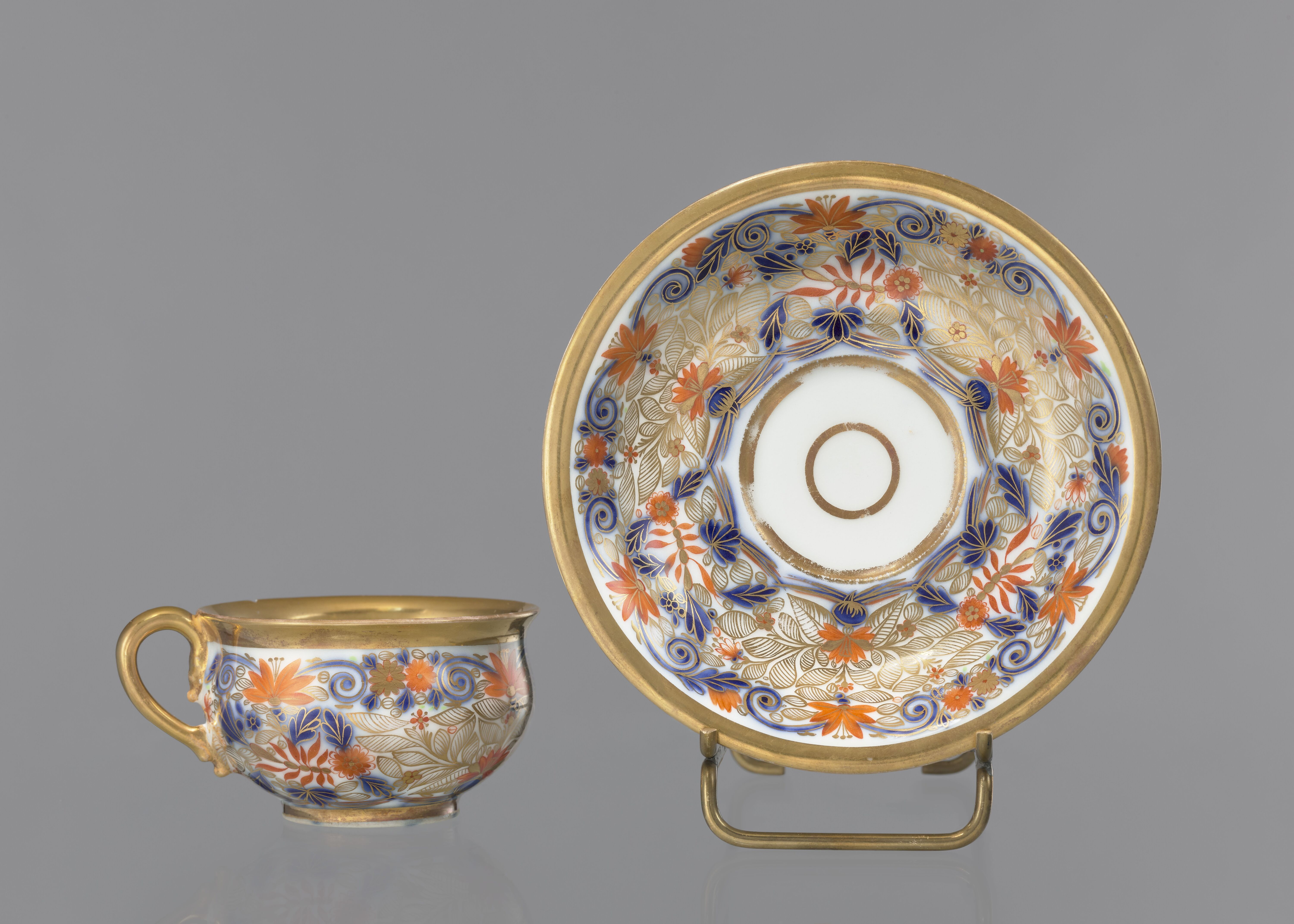
Baranivka porcelain from 1830

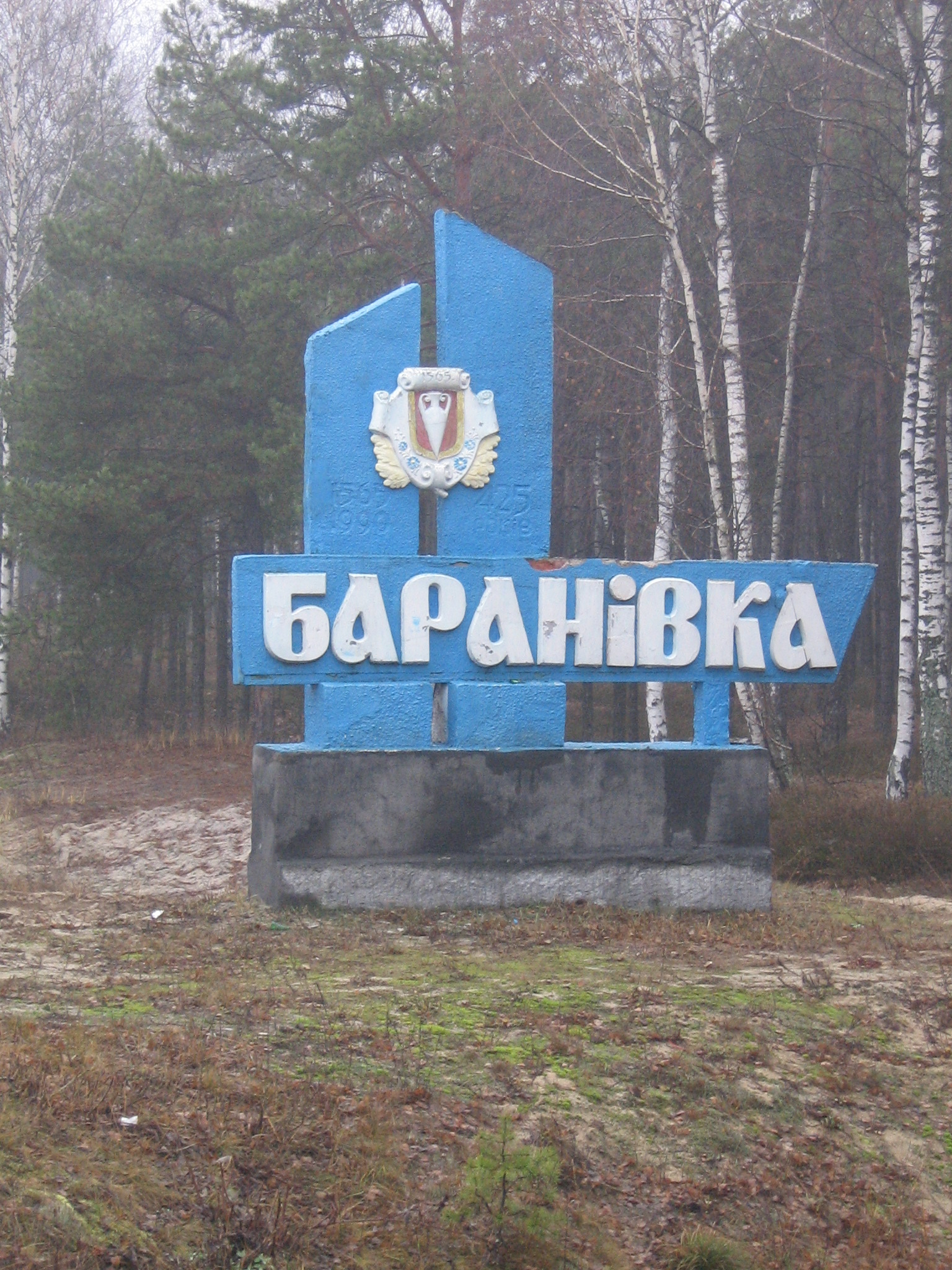
Stele on the road entrance to Baranivka
