= Church of the Holy Spirit, Zagreb =

Church of the Holy Spirit (Croatian: Župna crkva Duha Svetoga u Zagrebu)
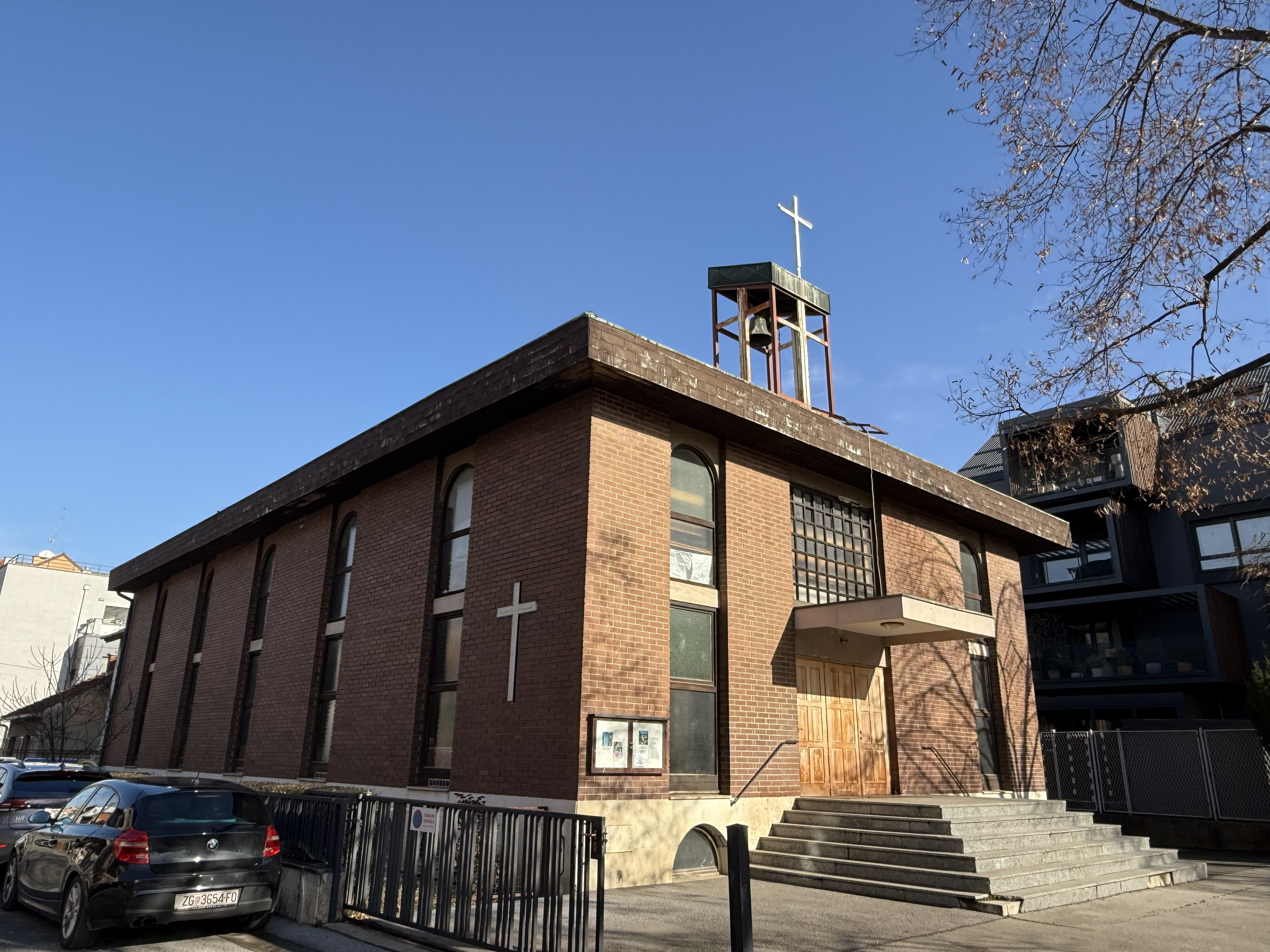
- View of the church
- Church of the Holy Spirit (Croatian: Župna crkva Duha Svetoga u Zagrebu)
- 45°47′29″N 15°55′39″E
- Location: Zagreb
- Country: Croatia
- Denomination: Roman Catholic

Architecture
- Functional status: Active
- Groundbreaking: 21 November 1981
- Completed: 1982

Church of the Holy Spirit, Zagreb (Croatian: Župna crkva Duha Svetoga u Zagrebu) is a Catholic parish church located in the neighbourhood Jarun of Zagreb, Croatia.

== History ==
The foundation stone for the church and the pastoral center was laid on 21 November 1981. The blessing ceremony was led by the auxiliary bishop of Zagreb, Đuro Kokša. The process of preparation and implementation of the construction was led by the provincial, Milan Litrić, Petar Šimić, and the parish administrator, Zvonko Krištić. The church and pastoral center were mostly completed in 1982.

The completed church was consecrated by the Archbishop of Zagreb, Franjo Kuharić. In addition to the church itself, religious education halls were built, as well as apartments for priests and nuns.

== Architecture ==
Two years after the completion of the church, in 1984, the church was enriched with an altarpiece commissioned from the Bolognese artist Paolo Figalo Giustiniani.

== Gallery ==
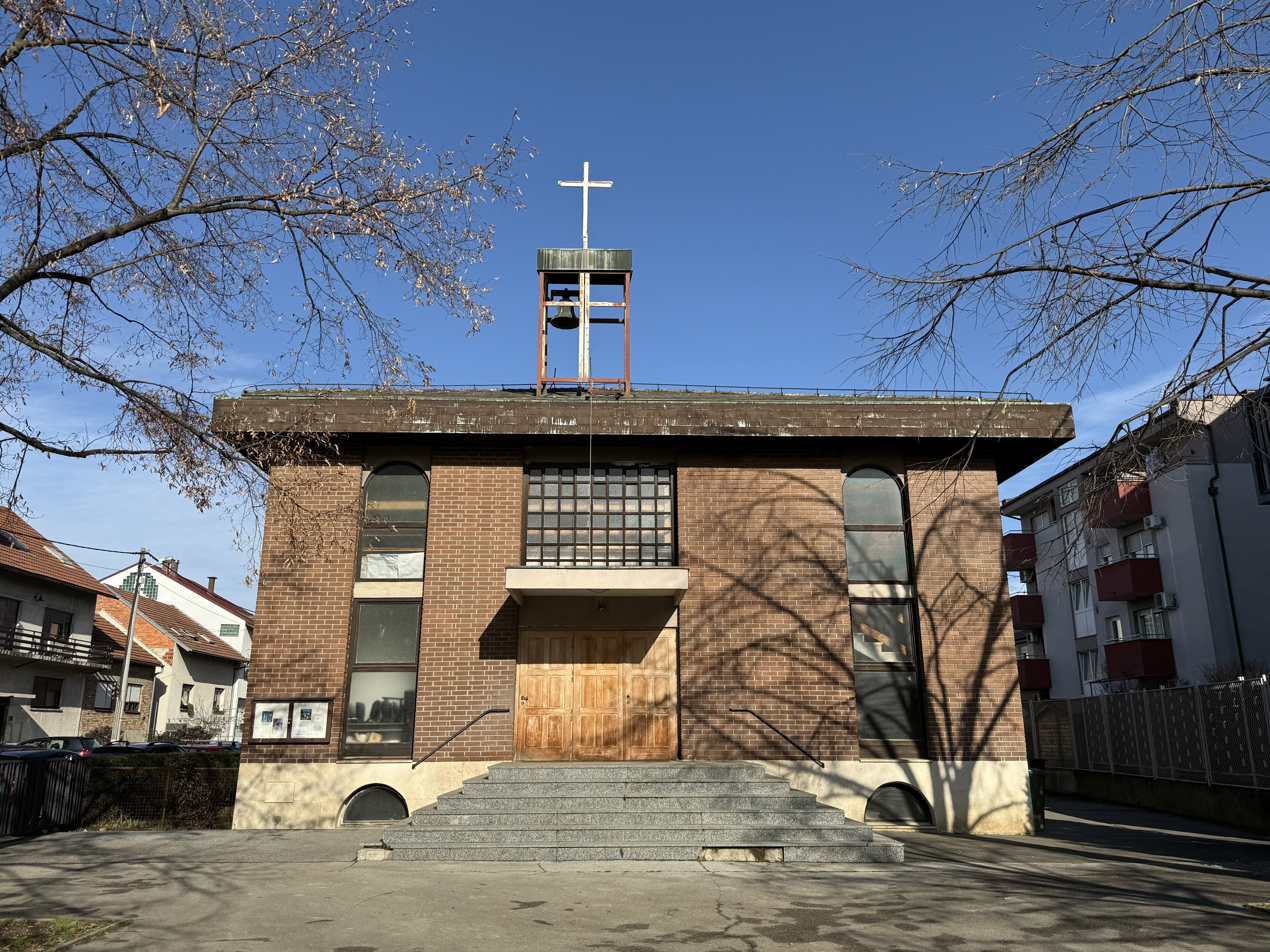
View of the church
