= Virlia =

Coordinates: 50°21′N 27°43′E

Virlia (Ukrainian: Вірля) is a village in Ukraine. It is located in Zviahel Raion, Zhytomyr Oblast.

The territorial administrative code (KOATUUI) is 1820680801. Its population was 742 in 2001. Its postal index is 12730. Its district telephone code is 4144.

== Village Council ==
The village council is located at 12734, Ukraine, Zhytomyr Oblast, Zviahel Raion, village Virlia.
