= Budysko =

Budysko Будисько
- Village
- Location within Zhytomyr Oblast Location within Ukraine
- Coordinates: 50.2336°N 27.7406°E
- Country: Ukraine
- Oblast: Zhytomyr Oblast
- Raion: Zviahel Raion
- Time zone: UTC+2 (EET)
  - Summer (DST): UTC+3 (EEST)

Budysko (Ukrainian: Будисько) is a village in Ukraine. Founded in 1882, it is located in Zviahel Raion, Zhytomyr Oblast. Its territorial location code (KOATUUI) is 1820656301. Its population is 15 people as of 2001. Its postal index is 12742. Its telephone calling code is 4144

== Village council ==
The village council is located at 12734, Ukraine, Zhytomyr Oblast, Baranivka Raion, township (urban-type settlement) Polyanka
