= Tupolev Tu-141 =

Soviet unmanned aerial vehicle

Tupolev Tu-141 Strizh
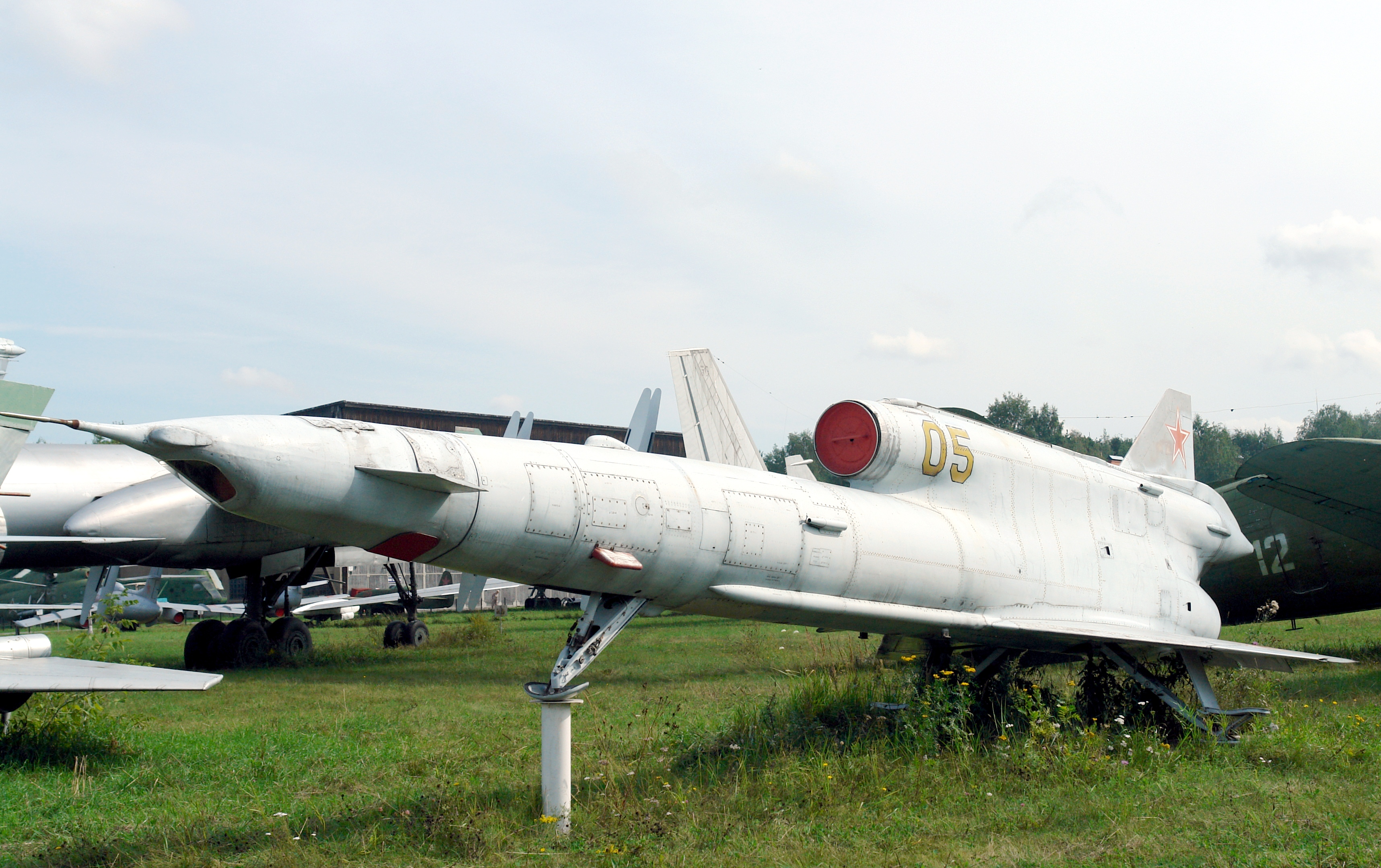
- A Tu-141 Strizh at the Central Air Force Museum, Monino, Russia

General information
- Type: Remotely-controlled, UAV
- Manufacturer: Tupolev
- Status: Active with the Ukrainian armed forces
- Primary users: Ukraine Soviet Union (formerly)
- Number built: 152

History
- Manufactured: 1979–1989
- Introduction date: 1979
- First flight: 1974
- Developed from: Tupolev Tu-123
- Developed into: Tupolev Tu-143

The Tupolev Tu-141 Strizh ("Swift"; Russian: Туполев Ту-141 Стриж) is a Soviet reconnaissance drone that served with the Soviet Army during the late 1970s and 1980s, and the Ukrainian Armed Forces since 2014.

== Development ==
Tu-141

The Tu-141 was a follow-on to the Tupolev Tu-123 and is a relatively large, medium-range reconnaissance drone. It is designed to undertake reconnaissance missions within a 1,000 kilometres (620 mi) radius, flying at transonic speeds. It can carry a range of payloads, including film cameras, infrared imagers, EO imagers, and imaging radar..

As with previous Tupolev designs, it has a dart-like rear-mounted delta wing, forward-mounted canards, and a KR-17A turbojet engine mounted above the tail. It is launched from a trailer using a solid-propellant booster and lands with the aid of a tail-mounted parachute.

== Operation and incidents ==
The Tu-141 was in Soviet service from 1979 to 1989, mostly on the western borders of the Soviet Union.

=== Russo-Ukrainian War ===
It was pressed back into service by the Ukrainian Air Force after 2014 for the war in Donbas.

==== Russo-Ukrainian war ====
After the 2022 Russian invasion of Ukraine began in February 2022, the Tu-141 was repurposed as a long range loitering munition.

On 8 March 2022, a Tu-141 reconnaissance drone was reported crashed in Ukraine.

About midnight on 10 March 2022, a Tu-141 crashed in front of a student campus in Zagreb, Croatia, over 550 kilometres (340 mi) from Ukraine. Before it crashed, it had flown over Romania and Hungary. There were no casualties. The Ukrainian Air Force claimed that the drone did not belong to them. The Russian Embassy in Zagreb stated that Russian forces had not had such drones in their arsenal since the collapse of the Soviet Union in 1991.

The Croatian president, Zoran Milanović, said it was clear the drone came from the direction of Ukraine, entering Croatia after flying over Hungary. On 15 March, an undisclosed source close to the ministry of defence of Croatia was cited in the Croatian news magazine Nacional as saying that the investigation had concluded that the crashed drone belonged to the Armed Forces of Ukraine and carried a bomb that was meant for striking Russia's positions, but the drone had strayed off course and crashed after it ran out of fuel.

On 3 July 2022, the governor of the Kursk region wrote on Telegram that "our air defenses shot down two Ukrainian Strizh drones".

On 5 December 2022, explosions were reported at two Russian airbases: the one at Engels-2 reportedly damaged two Tu-95s according to Baza; the other at the Dyagilevo military airbase near Ryazan destroyed a fuel truck, damaged a Tu-22M3, killed three people, and injured five. The Russian Ministry of Defense said that Ukraine struck these bases with Soviet-made jet drones, and that the drones were shot down at low altitude when approaching the air bases. The Ministry of Defense of Ukraine did not confirm the information.

On 26 December 2022, at midnight, explosions were again reported at Engels-2. Air sirens were reported being heard at the base and surrounding areas. The local governor Roman Busargin reported no damage to "civilian infrastructure". At least two explosions were heard, reported by both the Ukrainian and Russian media. Three people from the "technical staff" were reportedly killed. According to Russian television, "A Ukrainian unmanned aerial vehicle was shot down at low altitude while approaching the Engels military airfield in the Saratov region," Ukrainian and Russian social media accounts reported that a number of bombers were destroyed, although Reuters could not confirm these claims. A modified Tu-141 was used to undertake the attack.

On 26 March 2023, Russia stated that it had downed a Tu-141 near Kireyevsk using a Polye-21 jamming system, causing three casualties and damage to an apartment block.

== Specifications ==
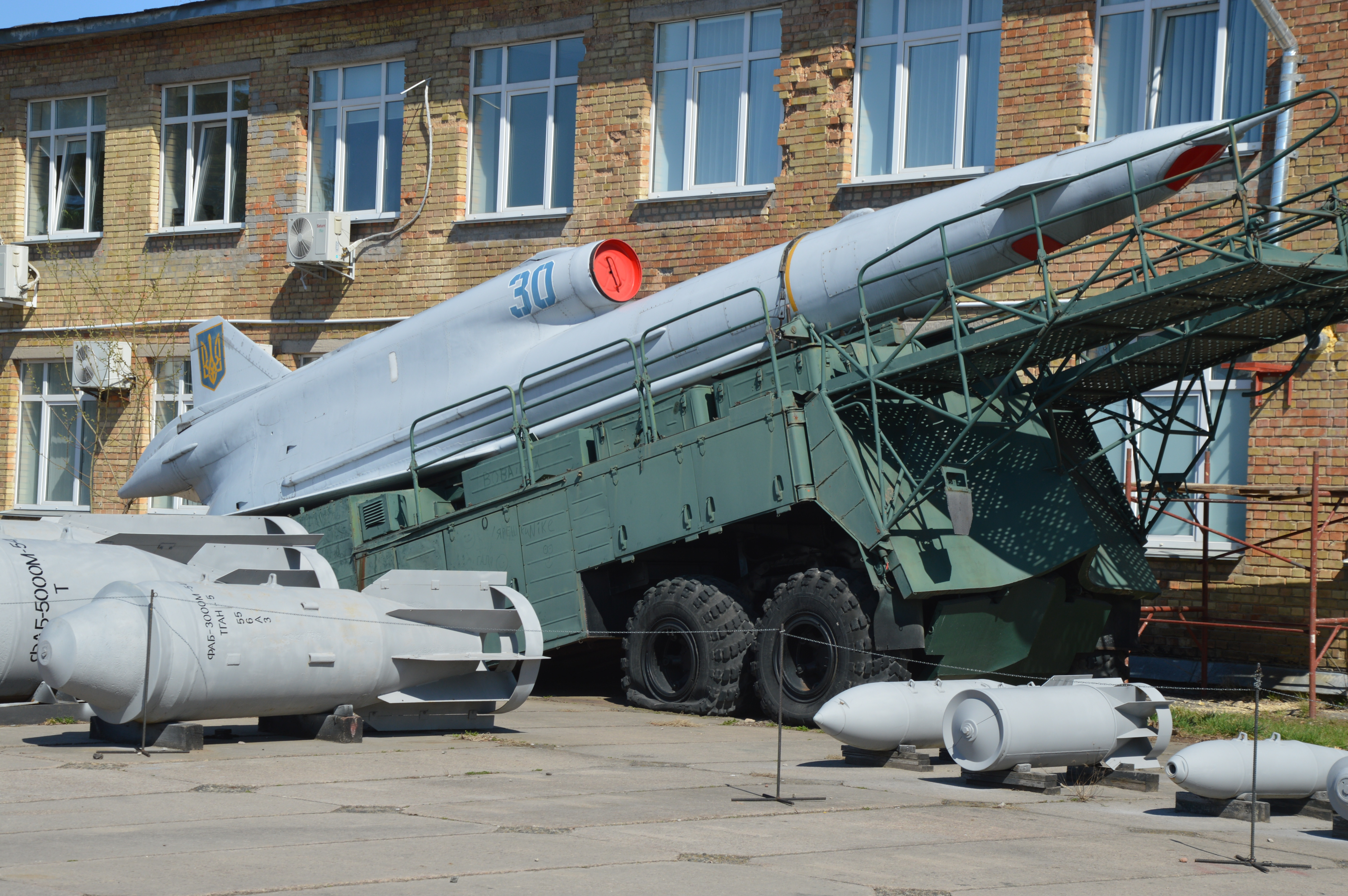
A Tu-141 on display at the State Aviation Museum in Kyiv

Data from Unmanned Aerial Vehicles Directory: Part 2

General characteristics

- Crew: none
- Length: 14.33 m (47 ft 0.25 in)
- Wingspan: 3.88 m (12 ft 8.5 in)
- Height: 2.44 m (8 ft 0 in)
- Wing area: 10.0 m^{2} (108 sq ft)
- Gross weight: 6,215 kg (13,702 lb)
- Powerplant: 1 × Tumansky KR-17A , 19.6 kN (4,409 lbf) thrust

Performance

- Maximum speed: 1,100 km/h (683 mph, 594 kn)
- Cruise speed: 1,000 km/h (620 mph, 540 kn)
- Range: 1,000 km (620 mi, 540 nmi)
- Service ceiling: 6,000 m (19,700 ft)

== Operators ==
=== Current ===
- Ukraine
  - 383rd UAV Brigade

=== Former ===
- Soviet Union
