= Tupolev Tu-143 =

Aircraft in the Soviet Army

Tupolev Tu-143 Reys
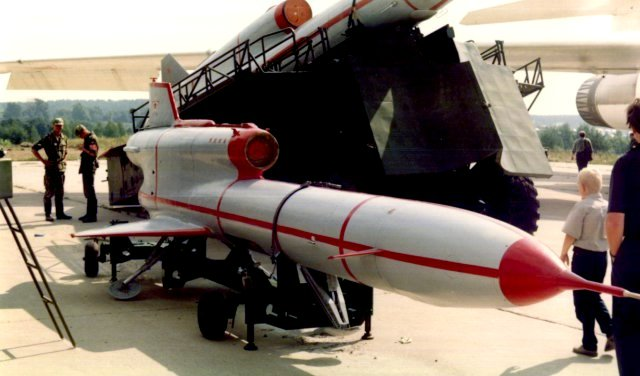
- Tu-143 "Reys"

General information
- Type: unmanned reconnaissance aircraft
- Manufacturer: Tupolev
- Status: Active
- Primary user: Soviet Union; Russia; Ukraine; Hezbollah
- Number built: 950

History
- Manufactured: 1973–1989 (Tu-243 1994-)
- Introduction date: 1976 (Army i.e. Ground Forces, SSV); 1982 (Air Force, VVS) (Tu-243 1999)
- First flight: 1970 (Tu-243 1987)
- Developed from: Tupolev Tu-141

The Tupolev Tu-143 Reys (Cruise, Russian: Рейс; also Reis, Rejs) was a Soviet unmanned reconnaissance aircraft in service with the Soviet Army and a number of its Warsaw Pact and Middle East allies during the late 1970s and 1980s. It contained a reconnaissance pod that was recovered after flight, and from which imagery was retrieved.

== History ==
=== Development ===
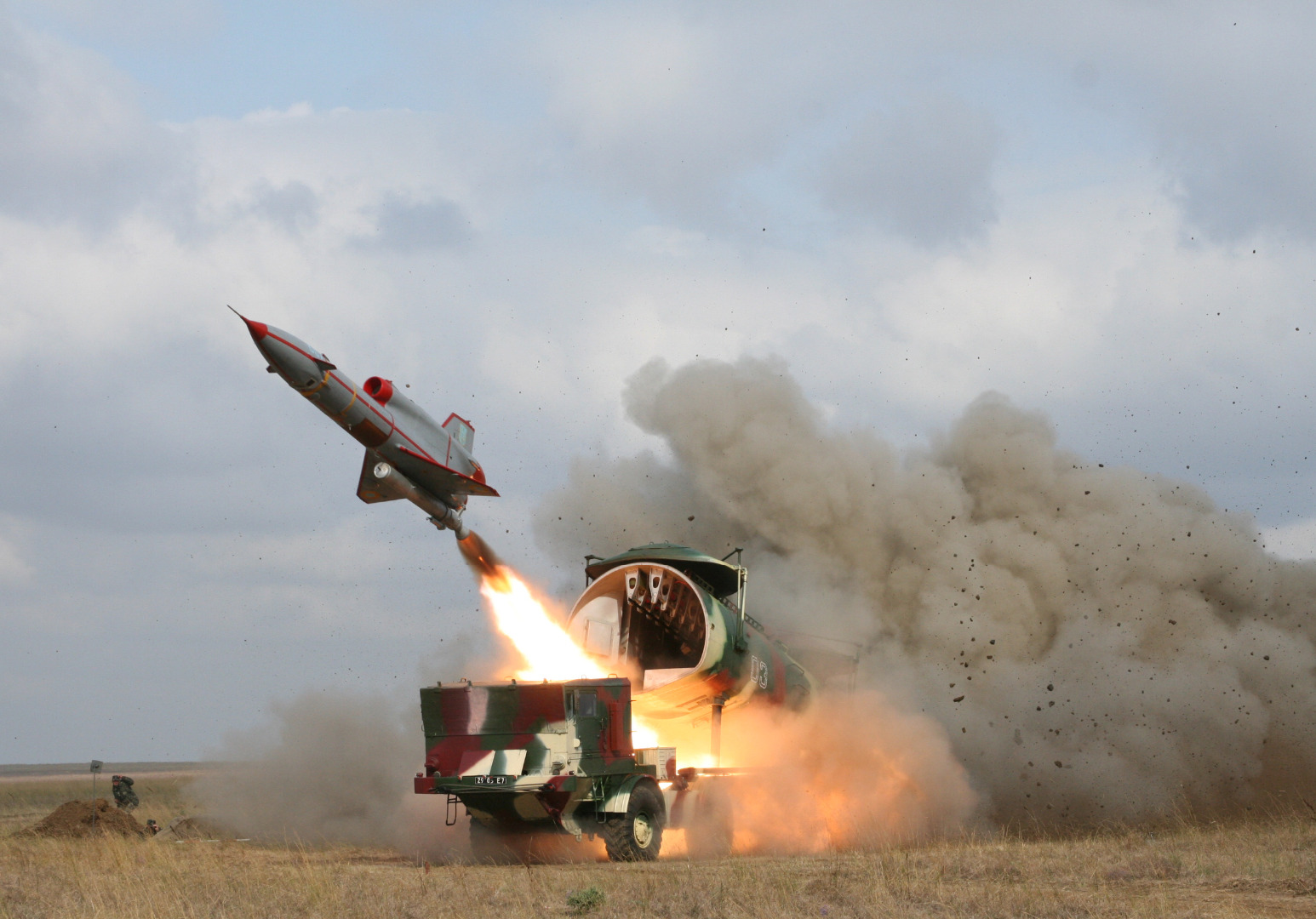
Tu-143 with launcher

The Tu-143 was introduced in 1976 and strongly resembled the Tu-141, but was substantially scaled-down. It was a short-range (60–70 kilometer) tactical reconnaissance system and had low-level flight capability. The Tu-143 was truck-launched with JATO boosting, recovered by parachute, and powered by a TR3-117 turbojet with 5.8 kN (590 kgf, 1300 lbf) thrust. The initial version carried film cameras, but later versions carried a TV or radiation detection payload, with data relayed to a ground station over a datalink. Some 950 units were produced in the 1970s and 1980s.

=== Operation history ===
The Tu-143 was used by Syria in reconnaissance missions over Israel and Lebanon during the 1982 Lebanon War, as well as by Soviet forces in Afghanistan during the Soviet–Afghan War.

During the 2022 Russian invasion of Ukraine, Ukraine appeared to use them to spot Russian air defences and as an ersatz cruise missile. On 29 June 2022, one Tu-143 carrying explosives was shot down in Kursk Oblast.

During the 2020s Israel–Hezbollah conflict Israel claimed that they destroyed a Hezbollah "DR-3 cruise missile" which they illustrated with images of the Tupolev Tu-143.

=== M-143 variant ===
A target drone version, the M-143, was introduced in the mid-1980s.

=== Tu-243 variant ===
The Tu-143 was followed into service in the late 1990s by the similar but improved "Tu-243 Reys-D", with a 25 cm (10 inch) fuselage stretch, to provide greater fuel capacity and about twice the range; it had an uprated TR3-117 engine with 6.28 kN (640 kgf, 1,410 lbf) thrust; and improved low-altitude guidance.

=== Tu-300 variant ===
Since 1995, Tupolev began promoting the further refined "Tu-300 Korshun", which resembles its predecessors but is fitted with a nose antenna dome and nose fairings for modern sensors and electronic systems. It also features a centerline pylon for a sensor pod or munitions. Financial issues forced a halt to development at the end of the 1990s, but work was resumed in 2007.

== Operators ==
=== Current operators ===
- Belarus
- North Korea
- Russia: In service as of 2016 as targets.
- Syria: Received VR-3s in 1984.
- Ukraine
- Hezbollah (Named DR-3)

=== Former operators ===
- Bulgaria: retired
- Czech Republic: VR-3 Rejs, retired in 1995
- Czechoslovakia: Received two squadrons in 1984
- Republic of Iraq
- Romania: VR-3 in service from 1987 until the early 2000s
- Slovakia: VR-3 Rejs, retired
- Soviet Union: Passed to successor states

== Specifications ==
Tupolev TU-143 Reys:

- wingspan 2.24 m (7 ft 4 in)
- length 8.06 m (26 ft 5 in)
- height 1.54 m (5 ft 1 in)
- launch weight 1,230 kg (2,710 lb)
- maximum speed 950 km/h (515 kn, 590 mph)
- engine Klimov turbojet TR3-117
- service ceiling 5,000 m (16,400 ft)
- range 200 km (110 nmi, 125 mi)
