= Yarun, Ukraine =

Village in Ukraine

Yarun Ярунь
- Village
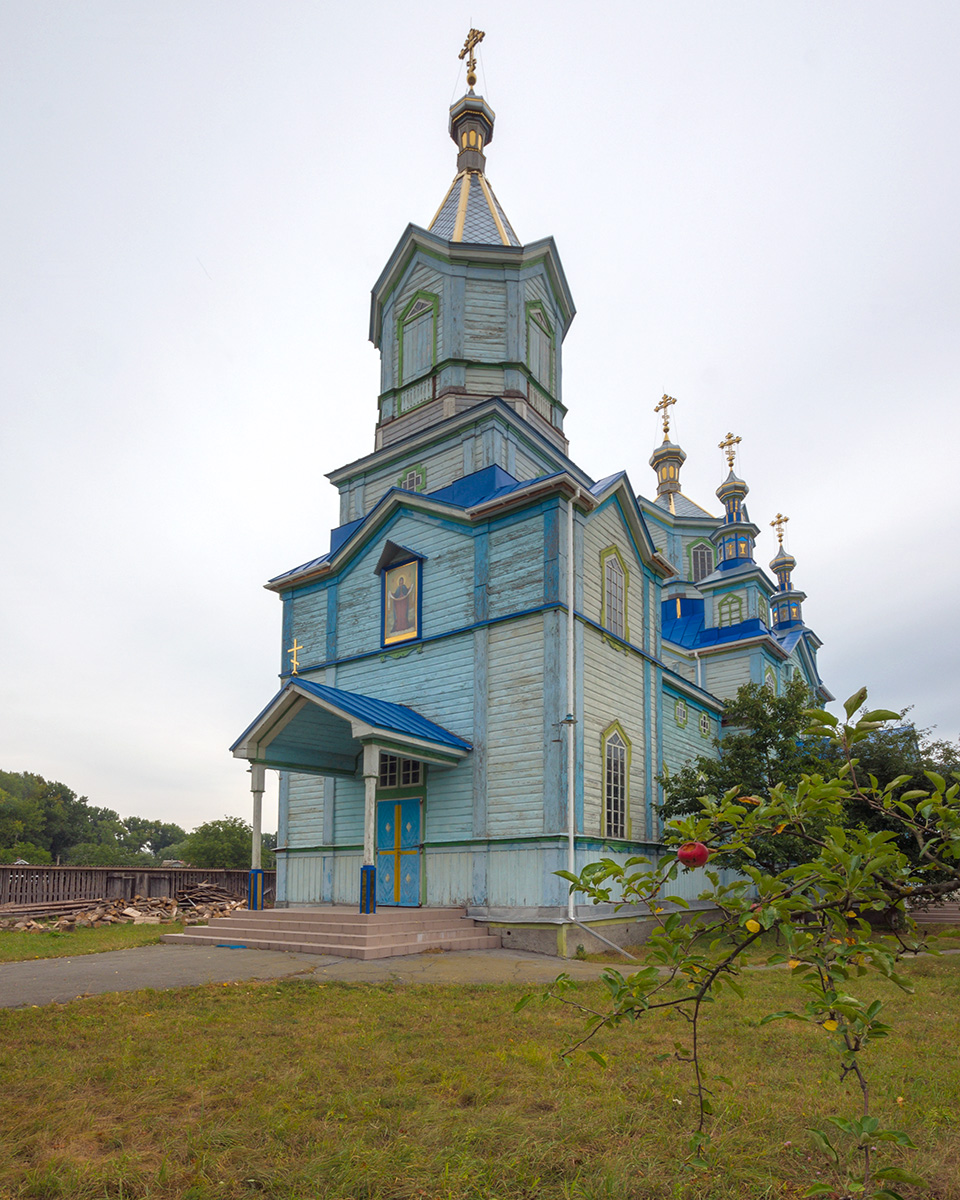
- Church of the Intercession
- Interactive map of Yarun
- Coordinates: 50.54333°N 27.46611°E
- Country: Ukraine
- Oblast: Zhytomyr Oblast
- Raion: Zviahel Raion
- Hromada: Yarun rural hromada
- Founded: 1540

Area
  - Total: 6.543 km^{2} (2.526 sq mi)
- Elevation: 214 m (702 ft)

Population (2016)
  - Total: 3,478
  - Density: 531.6/km^{2} (1,377/sq mi)
- Postal code: 11762
- Area code: +380 4141

Yarun (Ukrainian: Ярунь; Polish: Jaruń) is a village in Zviahel Raion, Zhytomyr Oblast, Ukraine.

The village is located approximately 247 km west of Kyiv and 105 km northwest of Zhytomyr.

Yarun is a center of the Yarun rural hromada, one of the hromadas of Ukraine.

== History ==
Archaeological findings show that the area has been inhabited since the Late Paleolithic period (approximately 15,000 years ago). In the Pasika area, where forests once grew on the hills and where the Tsarem River (58 km long) winds between high banks, as well as in the lands of Yarun, stone axes, knives, and hammers have been found.

The region of Yarun was rich in deposits of granite, peat, and sand. Forests full of game attracted hunters, while the meadows and rivers drew nomadic herders, and the fertile lands drew farmers. This is evidenced by burial mounds from the 4th–3rd centuries BCE discovered in the Pasika area.

The origin of the village name Yarun has not been definitively established. One version suggests that, since the riverbeds running through the village are deep and resemble ravines ("yar", "яр" in Ukrainian), this may have given rise to the name of the settlement.

However, in ancient records the village was referred to as "Yarun estate" (Ярунское имение), which allows the assumption that it may have been founded by someone named Yarun, whose identity is now unknown to us. A Kyiv boyar named Yarun, brother of Konstantyn Vasylovych, died in battle against the Polovtsians in the year 1170.

In the princely era, local military leadership was entrusted to a tysyatsky — a commander who organized local militias. Historical records mention the tysyatsky Yarun of Peremyshl (1213), and David Yarunovych, a tysyatsky of Kyiv, who "with the boyars chased the Polovtsians (Kipchaks) and defeated them".

In the 13th century, following the Batu Khan invasion, some villages and towns along the Sluch River made agreements with the Tatars. A. Polishchuk, in the newspaper Lesyn Krai (No. 54, 1997), wrote that local residents told him the village was once owned by a Tatar leader during ancient times, and possibly by a man named Yarun who served under the Tatars and gave his name to the settlement.

There is also a local legend that a voivode named Yarun founded the village. The title "voivode" (governor or military commander) first appears in the Ruthenian Voivodeship (1432) and in the Podolian Voivodeship (first mentioned in 1435).

Interestingly, there is also a village called Yarun in Udmurtia. The village may have been named by former settlers or deportees from the Ukrainian Yarun.

The village was first mentioned in a written source in 1540. At that time, Yarun was the property of Prince Korecki, who collected taxes in the form of honey, rye, flax, and money from 30 households. The taxation burden was so severe that, in 1546, the peasants submitted a complaint to the Grand Duke of Lithuania. However, this did not lead to any significant relief. After the Union of Lublin in 1569, when the region came under the control of the Polish–Lithuanian Commonwealth, obligations increased further. Serfdom expanded to three days of forced labor per week, and rent was paid in agricultural products.

In the 18th century, first Jewish residents arrived in Yarun from Korets and Zviahel. They settled in what is now the village center, then known as Sloboda — a name reflecting their status as free residents rather than serfs, obligated only to pay taxes. These were modestly resourced Jews engaged in local trade (operating around ten small shops), as well as the production of roof tiles, wagons, and sleds. They also ran tailoring and shoemaking workshops, tanned leather, and crafted both pottery and wooden utensils. There were also workshops for sewing shoes and clothing. The area was home to a steam mill owned by Reingold Herschel Rudolfovich and a mead factory operated by Barakhman Chaim Sani Yeruhimovich.

According to archival data, the ancestors of Israeli Foreign Minister Gideon Sa'ar lived in Yarun before the First World War, and their family name was "Sirota" (later - "Sirotski").

On May 10, 1903, Russian Tsar Nicholas II approved a list of 101 localities within the Pale of Settlement where Jews were permitted to reside freely. Yarun was included among them. The Jewish community lived in the area between the villages of Yarun and Yurkivshchyna, near the confluence of the Zholobenka and Koshelyvka (also known as Hrabianka) rivers with the Tserem River.

Following the outbreak of the First World War, a post office and telegraph station were established in Yarun in May 1916, and the first telephone was installed in 1924. In December 1917, the village was taken over by the Red Army, and a revolutionary committee was formed to redistribute land from local landowners. However, control of the village changed hands multiple times: first to the Ukrainian People’s Republic, then in February 1918 to German occupation forces, followed by the Directorate of Ukraine, again the Ukrainian People’s Republic, and later Denikin’s White Army. In April 1919, the Bolsheviks returned to Yarun. On 25 May 1920, the village was captured by Polish troops led by Józef Piłsudski, but on 27 June 1920, it was retaken by the Bolshevik 1st Cavalry Army.

In the late 1920s, Jewish collective farm "Vil'na Pratsya" and an agricultural artel were established in Yarun.

In 1924, a synagogue was registered in Yarun, which had 34 members of the community. In 1925, Yarun became a raion (district) center. According to the 1926 census, 36,025 people lived in the Yarun Raion. Of these, 30,566 were Ukrainians, 2,631 were Poles, 101 were Russians, and 741 were Jews, including 386 in Yarun.

During the Nazi occupation, in November 1941, the Germans established a ghetto for Jewish residents in Yarun. It housed approximately 700 people. On May 5, 1942, the Germans liquidated the ghetto and murdered the Jews in and around the town.

In 1957, the Yarun Raion was disbanded, and the village became part of the Novohrad-Volynsky Raion (district).

On 7 July 2020, the village became the centre of the newly formed Yarun territorial community (Ukrainian: Ярунська територіальна громада), which also includes 13 other settlements around Yarun: Budyshcha, Velyka Horbasha, Hirky, Zholobne, Kamianka, Kozhushky, Kolodianka, Korytyshcha, Lidivka, Mala Horbasha, Orepy, Ternivka, and Tokariv.

== Monuments ==
A monument to the Ukrainian writer Lesya Ukrainka is located in the village. It was installed in 2008 near the Land Management College of the State Agroecological University. Previously, a monument to Vladimir Lenin had stood at this site, which was dismantled in November 2007.

The hromada has several monuments of sacral architecture — three sites listed in the register of architectural monuments of local significance in Zhytomyr Oblast. Among them are the Church of the Intercession with a bell tower, the Church of the Nativity of the Virgin, and the Church of St. John the Theologian.

== Demographics ==
The 1939 Soviet census recorded 1,961 inhabitants: 1,422 Ukrainians, 108 Russians, 6 Germans, 386 Jews, 13 Poles, and 26 others.

As of the most recent data, the population of Yarun is approximately 2,800 residents.

== See also ==
- Jarun
- Zviahel Raion
