= Berestivka, Sumy Oblast =

Rural settlement in Sumy Oblast, Ukraine

Berestivka Берестівка
- Location of Berestivka Berestivka (Ukraine)
- Coordinates: 50°38′49″N 33°50′12″E
- Country: Ukraine
- Oblast: Sumy Oblast
- Raion: Romny Raion
- Hromada: Lypova Dolyna settlement hromada
- Elevation: 128 m (420 ft)

Population (2001)
  - Total: 808
- Climate: Cfa

Berestivka (Ukrainian: Берестівка) is a village in Romny Raion, Sumy Oblast (province) of Ukraine. It belongs to Lypova Dolyna settlement hromada, one of the hromadas of Ukraine.

== History ==
Berestivka suffered as a result of the genocide of the Ukrainian people carried out by Soviet government in 1932-1933 and 1946–1947, with the number of victims at 101 people.

Until 18 July 2020, Berestivka was previously located in the Lypova Dolyna Raion. The raion was abolished in July 2020 as part of the administrative reform of Ukraine, which reduced the number of raions of Sumy Oblast to five. The area of Lypova Dolyna Raion was merged into Romny Raion.

== Demographics ==
In 2001, Berestivka had 808 inhabitants, of whom 795 declared Ukrainian as their native language, 12 declared it as Russian, and 1 person did not declare it.
