= Berestivka, Zhytomyr Oblast =

Village in Ukraine

Coordinates: 50°20′26″N 27°28′34″E

Berestivka (Ukrainian: Берестівка) is a village in Ukraine. It is located in Zviahel Raion of Zhytomyr Oblast. Its location code is KOATUUI: 1820680401. Its population is 460 people as of 2001. Its postal index is 260570. Its calling code is 4144

== Village council ==
The village council is located at 12734, Ukraine, Zhytomyr Oblast, Baranivskiy district, village Berestivka
