= Zviahel Raion =

Subdivision of Zhytomyr Oblast, Ukraine

Zviahel Raion Звягельський район
- Raion
- Flag Coat of arms

- Coordinates: 50°39′N 27°45′E
- Country: Ukraine
- Oblast: Zhytomyr Oblast
- Admin. center: Zviahel
- Subdivisions: 12 hromadas

Area
  - Total: 5,242.6 km^{2} (2,024.2 sq mi)

Population (2022)
  - Total: 164,972
  - Density: 31.468/km^{2} (81.501/sq mi)
- Time zone: UTC+02:00 (EET)
  - Summer (DST): UTC+03:00 (EEST)
- Area code: +380

Zviahel Raion (Ukrainian: Звягельський район) is a raion (district) of Zhytomyr Oblast, northern Ukraine. Until 2022, it was known as Novohrad-Volynskyi Raion (Ukrainian: Новоград-Волинський район). Its administrative centre is located at Zviahel, Ukraine. The raion covers an area of 5,242.6 square kilometres (2,024.2 mi^{2}). Population: 164,972 (2022 estimate).

== History ==
The raion was originally created in 1923 as Novohrad-Volynskyi Raion, within the Volhynian Governorate of the Ukrainian SSR. In 1932, it was reassigned to Kyiv Oblast. In 1935, the raion was abolished.

During World War II, the raion's former territory was occupied by Nazi Germany from July 1941 to January 1944. Soviet partisans fought back against the occupation, and the Nazis burned down several villages.

In 1958, Novohrad-Volynskyi Raion was restored as part of Zhytomyr Oblast. Its boundaries were repeatedly changed until 1966, at which point they stayed the same for a long time.

On 18 July 2020, as part of the administrative reform of Ukraine, the number of raions of Zhytomyr Oblast was reduced to four, and the area of Novohrad-Volynskyi Raion was significantly expanded. Before the expansion, the area of the raion was 865.2 square kilometres (334.1 mi^{2}). The January 2020 estimate of the raion population was 43,789 (2020 est.).

The Ukrainian parliament renamed the raion Zviahel Raion, simultaneously approving the renaming of the city Zviahel, on 16 November 2022.

== Brief ==
It is located in the western part of Zhytomyr Oblast.

== Natural tourist objects ==
There is many reserves in a district: "Horodnytskyi", "Kazyava", "Tuhanivskyi", Chervonovilskyi" (all- national value), "Botanical", "Myheivskyi", "Sapozhynskyi", "Storozhivskyi", "Veresna", "Klenovskyi"(local value), sight of nature of national value "Larch", sight of landscape-gardening art of national value is Horodnytskyi park (ХІХ century), dendropark "Pilyava" (local value). River Sluch has numerous of thresholds and is interesting for the supporters of water tourism (the route of the second category of complication passes through this route).

== Social and historical tourist objects ==
There are numerous of sights of local value in a district: synagogue (ХІХ-ХХcenturies), the church of St. Anthony beginning of the ХХ century, St. George's church (1903); of the Virgin Protectress church and bell tower (1794, 1847) in v. Barvinovka, post-house (1854–58) in v. Bronyky, the church of St. John the Theologian (1912) in v. Mala Horbasha; Michael's church (1901) in v. Serednia Derazhnia; Intercession church (1907–11) in v. Yarun, Michael's church (1913) in v. Hrud; Church of Christmas of the Virgin(1847) in v. Zholobne; the Ascension’s church (1901) in v. Ivashkivka; Roman Catholic church (ХІХ century) in v. Lebedivka. In 1846 a famous Ukrainian poet Taras Shevchenko stayed at Hulsk. In honour of this event a memorable sign was set on the bank of the river Sluch. In Hulsk and other villages of the district along an old state boundary there were fortifications buildings (pillboxes, bunkers) of times of Second World War ("line of Stalin"), which are the objects of tourism.

== The natives of district ==
- German writer Herbert Henke (v. Aneta);
- doctor of Philological S. Zaika (v. Borysivka);
- writer О.Sobkovych (v. Velyka Derazhnia);
- dancer, the Honoured Artist of Ukraine Ye. Avramcuk (Horodnytsia);
- writer from the Diaspora P. Volynyak (v. Hulsk);
- writers М. Tkachuk (v. Zholobne), М. Karplyuk (v. Pyshchiv);
- the specialist in study of flora and geobotanist V. Artemchuk (v. Koseniv);
- ballet-master, people's artist of Ukraine R.Malynovskyi (v. Lebedivka);
- poet О. Prokopchuk (v. Suhovolia);
- composer B.Melnychuk (v. Tarashchanka);
- singer, the Honoured Artist of Ukraine G. Serheyeva (v. Tokarivka).

== Villages ==
- Berestivka
- Budysko
- Veresna
- Virlia
- Yarun'
